= List of county roads in Renville County, Minnesota =

- Standard county road markers

Highway names
- Interstates: Interstate X (I-X)
- US Highways: U.S. Highway X (US X)
- State: Trunk Highway X (MN X or TH X)
- County State-Aid Highways: County State-Aid Highway X (CSAH X)
- County Roads: County Road X (CR X)

System links
- County roads of Minnesota; Renville County

The following is a list of county-maintained roads in Renville County, Minnesota, United States. Some of the routes included in this list are also county-state-aid-highways (CSAH.)

== Route List ==
Number	Length (mi)	Length (km)	Southern or western terminus	Northern or eastern terminus	Local names	Formed	Removed	Notes
CSAH 1	—	—	Redwood County line	Kandiyohi County line		—	—	
CSAH 2	—	—	County 1 in Beaver Falls Township	Sibley County line	690th Avenue; 400th Street; 690th Avenue; County 3	—	—	
CSAH 3	—	—	Brown County line	County 11 in Osceola Township	420th Street; MN 19; US 212; 415th Street; 840th Avenue; 420th Street	—	—	
CSAH 4	—	—	County 6 in Flora Township	520th Avenue (County 8) in Martinsburg Township		—	—	
CSAH 5	—	—	Nicollet County line	520th Avenue (County 8) in Martinsburg Township	MN 19	—	—	
CSAH 6	—	—	Redwood County line	Kandiyohi County line		—	—	
CSAH 7	—	—	Minnesota 4 in Brookfield Township	Meeker County line	Meeker Renville Line Road	—	—	
CSAH 8	—	—	740th Avenue in Martinsburg Township	County 11 in Boon Lake Township	520th Street; US 212; Main Street; Yellowstone Trail; 2nd Street; 830th Avenue; 540th Street	—	—	
CSAH 9	—	—	Redwood County line	Chippewa County line		—	—	
CSAH 10	—	—	Yellow Medicine County line	Chippewa County line	140th Street; 90th Street	—	—	
CSAH 11	—	—	Minnesota 23 in Wang Township	McLeod County line	870th Avenue; 160th Street; 860th Street; County 5	—	—	
CSAH 12	—	—	Redwood County line	Chippewa County line		—	—	
CSAH 13	—	—	790th Avenue (County 17) in Troy Township	US 212 in Troy Township	310th Street	—	—	
CSAH 14	—	—	US 212 in Olivia	Kandiyohi County line		—	—	
CSAH 15	—	—	US 71 in Beaver Falls Township	County 12 in Sacred Heart Township	County 6; County 1	—	—	
CSAH 16	—	—	County 5 in Camp Township	Kandiyohi County line	450th Street	—	—	
CSAH 17	—	—	County 9 in Sacred Heart Township	County 5 in Bird Island Township	790th Avenue	—	—	
CSAH 18	—	—	Centennial Drive in Morton	County 2 in Birch Cooley Township	1st Avenue	—	—	
CSAH 19	—	—	County 1 in Beaver Falls Township	County 5 in Birch Cooley Township		—	—	
CSAH 20	—	—	Sibley County line	Meeker County 12 in Boon Lake Township	570th Street	—	—	
CSAH 21	—	—	Redwood County line	Kandiyohi County line	County 15; 260th Street; US 212; 250th Street	—	—	
CSAH 22	—	—	US 212 in Hector Township	Meeker Renville Line Road (County 7) in Brookfield Township	500th Street	—	—	
CSAH 23	—	—	Minnesota 4 in Hector Township	County 8 in Preston Lake Township	830th Avenue	—	—	
CSAH 24	—	—	540th Street (County 8) in Preston Lake Township	Meeker County 12 in Boon Lake Township	830th Avenue; 540th Street; 835th Avenue; 550th Street	—	—	
CSAH 26	—	—	Sibley County line	US 212 in Preston Lake Township	540th Street	—	—	
CSAH 27	—	—	Nicollet County line	County 2 in Wellington Township	510th Street; MN 19; 500th Street	—	—	
CSAH 28	—	—	Minnesota 4 in Fairfax	Minnesota 19 in Fairfax		—	—	
CSAH 29	—	—	County 5 in Franklin	Minnesota 19 in Franklin	2nd Avenue; 4th Street	—	—	
CSAH 30	—	—	Walnut Street in Sacred Heart	North Street in Sacred Heart	2nd Avenue	—	—	
CSAH 31	—	—	US 212 in Renville	Emerson Avenue in Renville	Main Street	—	—	
CSAH 32	—	—	US 212 in Danube	Railroad Street in Danube	2nd Street	—	—	
CSAH 33	—	—	Fairview Avenue in Olivia	Elm Avenue in Olivia	9th Street	—	—	
CSAH 34	—	—	US 212 in Hector	Minnesota 4 in Hector	5th Street; Ash Avenue	—	—	
CSAH 35	—	—	Minnesota 19 in Morton	County 18 in Morton	Centennial Drive; 3rd Street	—	—	
CSAH 36	—	—	570th Street (County 20) in Boon Lake Township	McLeod County line	870th Avenue	—	—	
CSAH 37	—	—	140th Street (County 10) in Hawk Creek Township	Chippewa County line	810th Avenue; 110th Street	—	—	
CSAH 38	—	—	550th Street (County 24) in Boon Lake Township	570th Street (County 20) in Preston Lake Township	840th Avenue	—	—	
CSAH 39	—	—	450th Street (County 16) in Camp Township	Minnesota 4 in Cairo Township	620th Avenue	—	—	
CR 50	—	—	County 21 in Flora Township	Sibley County line	730th Avenue	—	—	
CR 51	—	—	Minnesota 19 in Birch Cooley Township	County 5 in Birch Cooley Township	730th Avenue	—	—	
CR 52	—	—	Chippewa County line	160th Street (County 55) in Hawk Creek Township	810th Avenue	—	—	
CR 53	—	—	County 6 in Emmet Township	US 71 in Troy Township	810th Avenue	—	—	
CR 54	—	—	County 8 in Preston Township	Meeker Renville Line Road (County 7) in Boon Lake Township	520th Street	—	—	
CR 55	—	—	145th Street (County 81) in Hawk Creek Township	840th Street in Sacred Heart Township	782nd Avenue; 160th Street	—	—	Southern Segment
CR 55	—	—	US 212 in Hawk Creek Township	90th Street in Wang Township	150th Street	—	—	Northern Segment
CR 56	—	—	US 212 in Preston Lake Township	830th Avenue (County 24) in Preston Lake Township	540th Street	—	—	
CR 57	—	—	840th Avenue (County 70) in Osceola Township	Kandiyohi County line	405th Street	—	—	
CR 58	—	—	US 212 in Sacred Heart Township	880th Avenue in Ericson Township	180th Street	—	—	
CR 59	—	—	US 212 in Emmet Township	Kandiyohi County line	270th Street; 240th Avenue	—	—	
CR 60	—	—	US 212 in Hawk Creek Township	90th Street (County 10) in Wang Township	130th Street	—	—	
CR 61	—	—	County 15 in Sacred Heart Township	Chippewa County line	210th Street	—	—	
CR 62	—	—	County 6 in Flora Township	US 71 in Henryville Township	770th Avenue	—	—	
CR 63	—	—	830th Avenue (County 70) in Hector Township	870th Avenue in Brookfield Township	470th Street	—	—	
CR 64	—	—	County 9 in Ericson Township	County 5 in Kingman Township	890th Avenue	—	—	
CR 65	—	—	280th Street in Winfield Township	Elm Avenue in Olivia	850th Avenue; 340th Street; 830th Avenue	—	—	
CR 66	—	—	US 212 in Melville Township	County 3 in Melville Township	415th Street; 795th Avenue	—	—	
CR 67	—	—	County 2 in Wellington Township	US 212 in Hector Township	500th Street	—	—	
CR 69	—	—	County 19 in Birch Cooley Township	860th Avenue (County 11) in Kingman Township	370th Street; 840th Avenue; 365th Street	—	—	
CR 70	—	—	County 14 in Bird Island Township	Minnesota 4 in Hector Township	840th Avenue; County 16; 830th Avenue	—	—	
CR 71	—	—	County 3 in Bandon Township	County 5 in Bird Island Township	660th Avenue; 420th Street; 690th Avenue; 410th Street; 790th Avenue	—	—	
CR 72	—	—	County 19 in Beaver Falls Township	County 4 in Henryville Township	300th Street	—	—	
CR 73	—	—	Minnesota 19 in Franklin	County 2 in Birch Cooley Township	660th Avenue; 400th Street	—	—	
CR 74	—	—	Minnesota 19 in Fairfax	730th Avenue (County 50) in Palmyra Township	660th Avenue; 460th Street	—	—	
CR 75	—	—	Minnesota 4 in Wellington Township	Sibley County line	680th Avenue	—	—	
CR 76	—	—	610th Avenue (County 77) in Cairo Township	Minnesota 4 in Cairo Township	490th Street; 640th Avenue	—	—	
CR 77	—	—	Minnesota 4 in Cairo Township	510th Street (County 27) in Cairo Township	610th Avenue	—	—	
CR 78	—	—	County 11 in Osceola Township	Kandiyohi County line	420th Street	—	—	
CR 79	—	—	County 5 in Norfolk Township	County 3 in Palmyra Township	770th Avenue	—	—	
CR 80	—	—	DEAD END in Morton	Centennial Drive in Morton		—	—	
CR 81	—	—	County 12 in Sacred Heart Township	140th Street (County 10) in Hawk Creek Township	800th Avenue; 145th Street	—	—	
CR 82	—	—	County 8 in Preston Lake Township	570th Street (County 20) in Preston Lake Township	810th Avenue; 530th Street; 815th Avenue	—	—	
Former
