= 1881 Minnesota tornado outbreak =

Weather event in Minnesota, United States

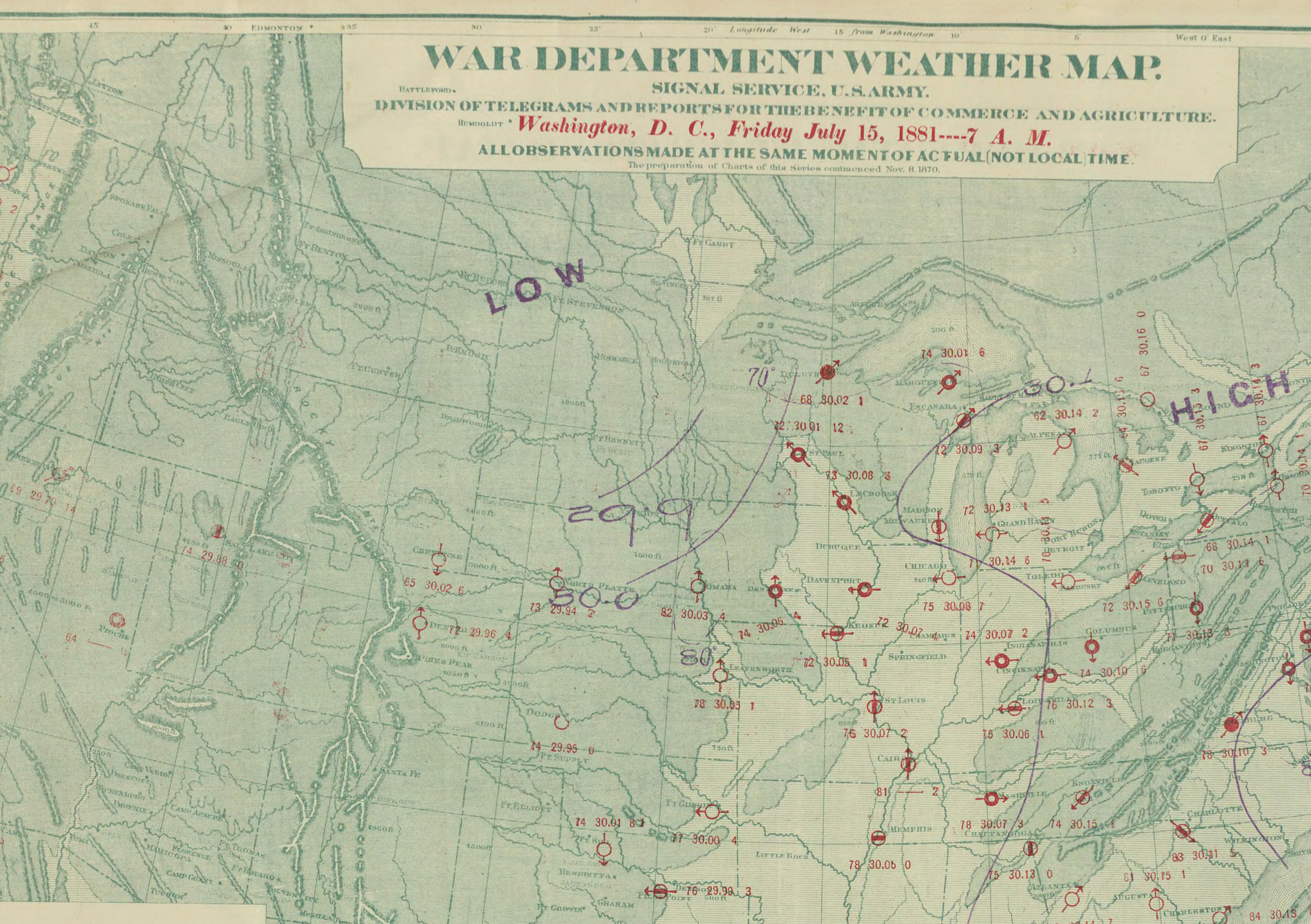
- Weather map of the low pressure system near Canada that would produce the tornado outbreak over Minnesota on July 15, 1881.

Tornado outbreak
- Tornadoes: ≥ 6
- Max. rating: F4 tornado
- Duration: July 15–16, 1881

Overall effects
- Fatalities: 24
- Injuries: 123
- Damage: > $300,000 ($10,010,000 in 2025 USD) (Note: All losses are in 1881 United States dollars unless otherwise noted.)
- Areas affected: Minnesota
- Part of the tornadoes and tornado outbreaks of 1881

On July 15–16, 1881, a deadly tornado outbreak struck southern Minnesota, featuring at least six tornadoes, 24 deaths, and 123 injuries. The deadliest tornado of the outbreak, retroactively rated F4 on the Fujita scale, killed 20 people in and near New Ulm; it was likely a long-tracked tornado family and may have caused F5 damage to rural farmsteads. An F4 tornado elsewhere in Minnesota killed four more people, and additional strong tornadoes occurred in the state. (Note: An outbreak is generally defined as a group of at least six tornadoes (the number sometimes varies slightly according to local climatology) with no more than a six-hour gap between individual tornadoes. An outbreak sequence, prior to (after) the start of modern records in 1950, is defined as a period of no more than two (one) consecutive days without at least one significant (F2 or stronger) tornado.)

== Confirmed tornadoes ==
Confirmed tornadoes by Fujita rating
FU	F0	F1	F2	F3	F4	F5	Total
0	?	?	3	1	2	0	≥6

Prior to 1990, there is a likely undercount of tornadoes, particularly E/F0–1, with reports of weaker tornadoes becoming more common as population increased. A sharp increase in the annual average E/F0–1 count by approximately 200 tornadoes was noted upon the implementation of NEXRAD Doppler weather radar in 1990–1991. (Note: Historically, the number of tornadoes globally and in the United States was and is likely underrepresented: research by Grazulis on annual tornado activity suggests that, as of 2001, only 53% of yearly U.S. tornadoes were officially recorded. Documentation of tornadoes outside the United States was historically less exhaustive, owing to the lack of monitors in many nations and, in some cases, to internal political controls on public information. Most countries only recorded tornadoes that produced severe damage or loss of life. Significant low biases in U.S. tornado counts likely occurred through the early 1990s, when advanced NEXRAD was first installed and the National Weather Service began comprehensively verifying tornado occurrences.) 1974 marked the first year where significant tornado (E/F2+) counts became homogenous with contemporary values, attributed to the consistent implementation of Fujita scale assessments. (Note: The Fujita scale was devised under the aegis of scientist T. Theodore Fujita in the early 1970s. Prior to the advent of the scale in 1971, tornadoes in the United States were officially unrated. Tornado ratings were retroactively applied to events prior to the formal adoption of the F-scale by the National Weather Service. While the Fujita scale has been superseded by the Enhanced Fujita scale in the U.S. since February 1, 2007, Canada used the old scale until April 1, 2013; nations elsewhere, like the United Kingdom, apply other classifications such as the TORRO scale.) Numerous discrepancies on the details of tornadoes in this outbreak exist between sources. The total count of tornadoes and ratings differs from various agencies accordingly. The list below documents information from the most contemporary official sources alongside assessments from tornado historian Thomas P. Grazulis.

=== July 15 event ===
List of confirmed tornadoes – Friday, July 15, 1881
F#	Location	County / Parish	State	Time (UTC) (Note: All dates are based on the local time zone where the tornado touched down; however, all times are in Coordinated Universal Time and dates are split at midnight CST/CDT for consistency.)	Path length	Width (Note: The listed width values are primarily the average/mean width of the tornadoes, with those having known maximum widths denoted by ♯. From 1952 to 1994, reports largely list mean width whereas contemporary years list maximum width. Values provided by Grazulis are the average width, with estimates being rounded down (i.e. 0.5 mi (0.80 km) is rounded down from 880 yards to 800 yards.)	Damage
F4	SE of Ortonville to Fairfield to N of Appleton	Lac qui Parle, Big Stone, Swift	MN	20:00–?	30 mi (48 km)	600 yd (550 m)	Unknown
F4	4 deaths – This long-lived, violent tornado may have formed across the Minnesota–South Dakota state line, damaging six farms near Odessa, but with no deaths. It leveled numerous farms in the Odessa–Correll area before killing four people in and near Fairfield. 15 injuries occurred.						
F4+	Western Bird Island to S of New Ulm	Renville, Sibley, Nicollet, Brown	MN	21:30–?	40 mi (64 km)	1,760 yd (1,610 m)♯	$300,000
F4+	20 deaths – See section on this tornado – 93 people were injured.						
F2+	S of Sleepy Eye	Brown, Watonwan	MN	22:50–?	≥8 mi (13 km)	200 yd (180 m)	Unknown
F2+	A tornado leveled barns and snapped or uprooted trees. Grazulis originally rated it F4, noting a 50-mile (80 km) path and 30 injuries in 1984, but subsequently downgraded it.						
F2	N of Winnebago	Blue Earth, Faribault	MN	00:00–?	5 mi (8.0 km)	400 yd (370 m)	Unknown
F2	A tornado hit and destroyed 12 farm buildings, including three or more barns. 11 injuries occurred.						
F3	S of Mountain Lake to W of Odin	Cottonwood, Watonwan	MN	00:10–?	8 mi (13 km)	200 yd (180 m)	Unknown
F3	An intense tornado nearly leveled a farmhouse, except for a wall fragment. It also tore apart four other farmhouses, each of which it unroofed, and killed cattle as well. Four injuries occurred.						

=== July 16 event ===
List of confirmed tornadoes – Saturday, July 16, 1881
F#	Location	County / Parish	State	Time (UTC)	Path length	Width	Damage
F2	Boys Lake	Redwood	MN	Unknown	Unknown	Unknown	Unknown
F2	A tornado swept away outbuildings, a stable, and a farmhouse, leaving "hardly a vestige" behind, according to an account quoted by Grazulis.						

=== Bird Island–New Ulm, Minnesota ===
Bird Island–New Ulm, Minnesota
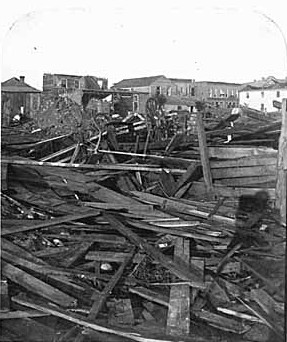
- Damage in New Ulm from the tornado

F4+ tornado
- on the Fujita scale

Overall effects
- Fatalities: 20
- Injuries: 93
- Damage: $300,000 ($10,010,000 in 2025 USD)

A potent, long-lived tornado family—likely of F5 intensity—devastated farms and the western side of New Ulm. It struck five farms in Wellington Township, obliterating every building on each of them and causing a few deaths. The tornado killed five more people in Cairo Township, all in one family. A boy and his herd of 40 cattle perished as well. On the Minnesota River, the tornado razed nine homes in West Newton, claiming five more lives. Observers reported two parallel damage swaths nearby, indicating two or more tornadoes in the area and possible reformation into a distinct event. Next, the tornado veered sharply to the left as it entered the western side of New Ulm, destroying that section of town, demolishing 47 structures, and killing half a dozen people. The town was hard hit, with 247 buildings damaged or destroyed; many homes in town were leveled as well. In New Ulm the tornado was up to 1 mi (1.6 km) wide, following a zigzag track.

== See also ==
- Climate of Minnesota
- List of North American tornadoes and tornado outbreaks

== Sources ==
- Agee, Ernest M.; Childs, Samuel (June 1, 2014). "Adjustments in Tornado Counts, F-Scale Intensity, and Path Width for Assessing Significant Tornado Destruction". Journal of Applied Meteorology and Climatology. 53 (6). American Meteorological Society: 1494–1505. Bibcode:2014JApMC..53.1494A. doi:10.1175/JAMC-D-13-0235.1.
- Brooks, Harold E. (April 2004). "On the Relationship of Tornado Path Length and Width to Intensity". Weather and Forecasting. 19 (2): 310–19. Bibcode:2004WtFor..19..310B. doi:10.1175/1520-0434(2004)019<0310:OTROTP>2.0.CO;2.
- Cook, A. R.; Schaefer, J. T. (August 2008). "The Relation of El Niño–Southern Oscillation (ENSO) to Winter Tornado Outbreaks". Monthly Weather Review. 136 (8): 3121–3137. Bibcode:2008MWRv..136.3121C. doi:10.1175/2007MWR2171.1.
- Edwards, Roger; LaDue, James G.; Ferree, John T.; Scharfenberg, Kevin; Maier, Chris; Coulbourne, William L. (May 1, 2013). "Tornado Intensity Estimation: Past, Present, and Future". Bulletin of the American Meteorological Society. 94 (5). American Meteorological Society: 641–653. Bibcode:2013BAMS...94..641E. doi:10.1175/BAMS-D-11-00006.1.
- Grazulis, Thomas P. (May 1984). Violent Tornado Climatography, 1880–1982. OSTI (Technical report). NUREG. Washington, D.C.: Nuclear Regulatory Commission. OSTI 7099491. CR-3670.
  - — (November 1990). Significant Tornadoes 1880–1989. Vol. 2. St. Johnsbury, Vermont: The Tornado Project of Environmental Films. ISBN 1-879362-02-3.
  - — (July 1993). Significant Tornadoes 1680–1991: A Chronology and Analysis of Events. St. Johnsbury, Vermont: The Tornado Project of Environmental Films. ISBN 1-879362-03-1.
  - — (2001a). The Tornado: Nature's Ultimate Windstorm. Norman: University of Oklahoma Press. ISBN 978-0-8061-3538-0.
  - — (2001b). F5-F6 Tornadoes. St. Johnsbury, Vermont: The Tornado Project of Environmental Films.
- Seely, Mark W. (2006). Minnesota Weather Almanac (1st ed.). Minnesota Historical Society Press. ISBN 0-87351-554-4.
