= Camp Township =

Camp Township may refer to:

- Camp Township, Polk County, Iowa
- Camp Township, Renville County, Minnesota

== See also ==
- Camp Creek Township, Ohio
