= Joseph Brown House Ruins =

Historic ruins in Minnesota, United States

- U.S. National Register of Historic Places
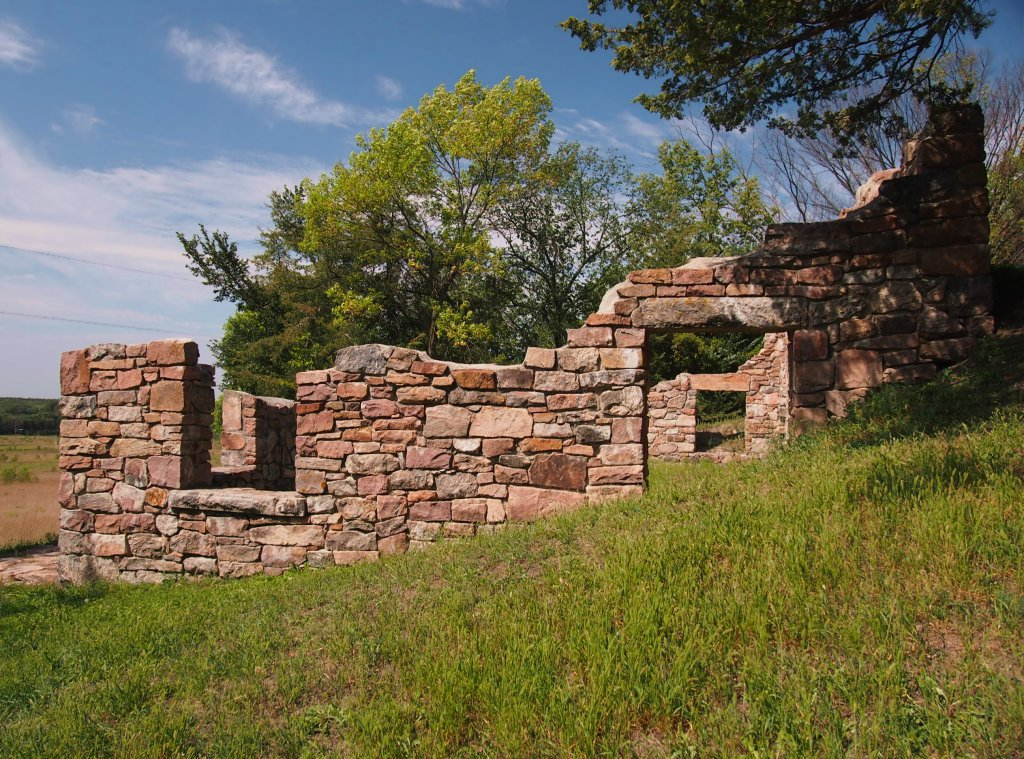
- Ruins of Joseph R. Brown's house, burned in 1862

- Location within Minnesota Location within the United States
- Location: Sacred Heart Township, Renville County, Minnesota, USA
- Nearest city: Sacred Heart, Minnesota
- Coordinates: 44°41′47″N 95°19′22″W
- Built: 1861
- Architect: Leopold Wohler
- NRHP reference No.: 86002838
- Added to NRHP: August 3, 1986

The Joseph R. Brown State Wayside Rest is a National Scenic Byway Wayside Rest area. It is located on Renville County Highway 15, south of Sacred Heart, Minnesota, United States.

The Wayside Rest displays the granite ruins of Joseph R. Brown's home from 1862. Brown, his multiracial wife and twelve children lived in this home, which was a center of hospitality along the Minnesota River Valley. The three-story home was then considered a mansion compared to typical pioneer homes. It was destroyed during the Dakota War of 1862 on August 19, 1862. His family was spared because of his wife's Dakota heritage.

Brown was a politician, inventor, publisher, and Indian Agent.

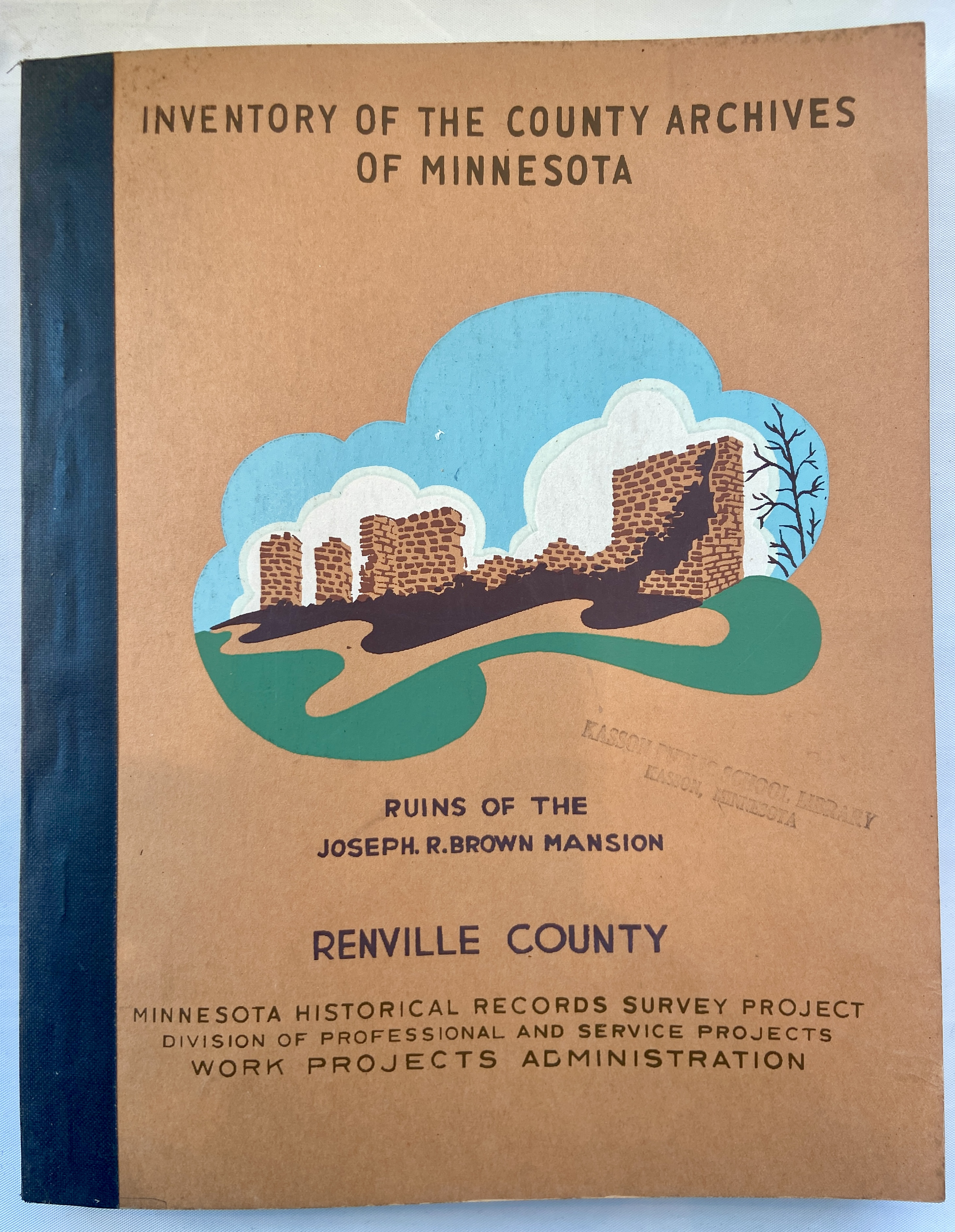
Joseph Brown house ruins were used to illustrate the WPA's Renville County edition of "Inventory of County Archives of Minnesota"
