= Henryville (disambiguation) =

Henryville, Indiana is a census designated place in the United States.

Henryville may also refer to:

- Henryville, Pennsylvania
- Henryville, Quebec
- Henryville, Tennessee
- Henryville Township, Renville County, Minnesota
- Henryville Jr/Sr High School, a school in Henryville, Indiana
