= Kingman Township =

Kingman Township may refer to the following townships in the United States:

- Kingman Township, Kingman County, Kansas
- Kingman Township, Renville County, Minnesota
