= Bechyn, Minnesota =

Bechyn
- Unincorporated community
- Location within Minnesota Location within the United States
- Coordinates: 44°39′02″N 95°04′34″W
- Country: United States
- State: Minnesota
- County: Renville
- Elevation: 1,063 ft (324 m)
- Time zone: UTC-6 (Central (CST))
  - Summer (DST): UTC-5 (CDT)
- Area code: 320
- GNIS feature ID: 639844

Bechyn is an unincorporated community in Henryville Township, Renville County, Minnesota, United States. It is situated 10 miles (16 km) north of Redwood Falls and 13 miles (21 km) south of Olivia.

The community was started by Czech settlers in 1867 and named after the South Bohemian town of Bechyně in present-day Czech Republic.

Annual Czech Heritage Festival held in Bechyn in August commemorates the Czech history of the settlement and revolves around the historic Church of St. Mary. It is organized by the non-profit St. Mary's Preservation Association of Bechyn.
