= Hector Township =

Hector Township may refer to the following townships in the United States:

- Hector Township, Potter County, Pennsylvania
- Hector Township, Renville County, Minnesota

== See also ==
- Hectors Creek Township, Harnett County, North Carolina
