= Lakeside, Minnesota =

Lakeside
- Unincorporated community
- Location within Minnesota Location within the United States
- Coordinates: 44°50′03″N 94°33′33″W
- Country: United States
- State: Minnesota
- County: Renville
- Elevation: 1,070 ft (330 m)
- Time zone: UTC-6 (Central (CST))
  - Summer (DST): UTC-5 (CDT)
- Area code: 320
- GNIS feature ID: 646410

Lakeside is an unincorporated community in Boon Lake Township, Renville County, Minnesota, United States.
