= Renville County Historical Museum =

Museum Morton, Minnesota, US

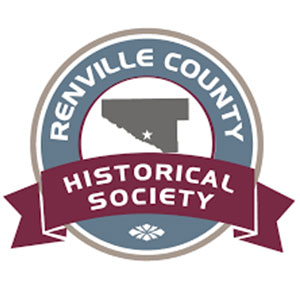

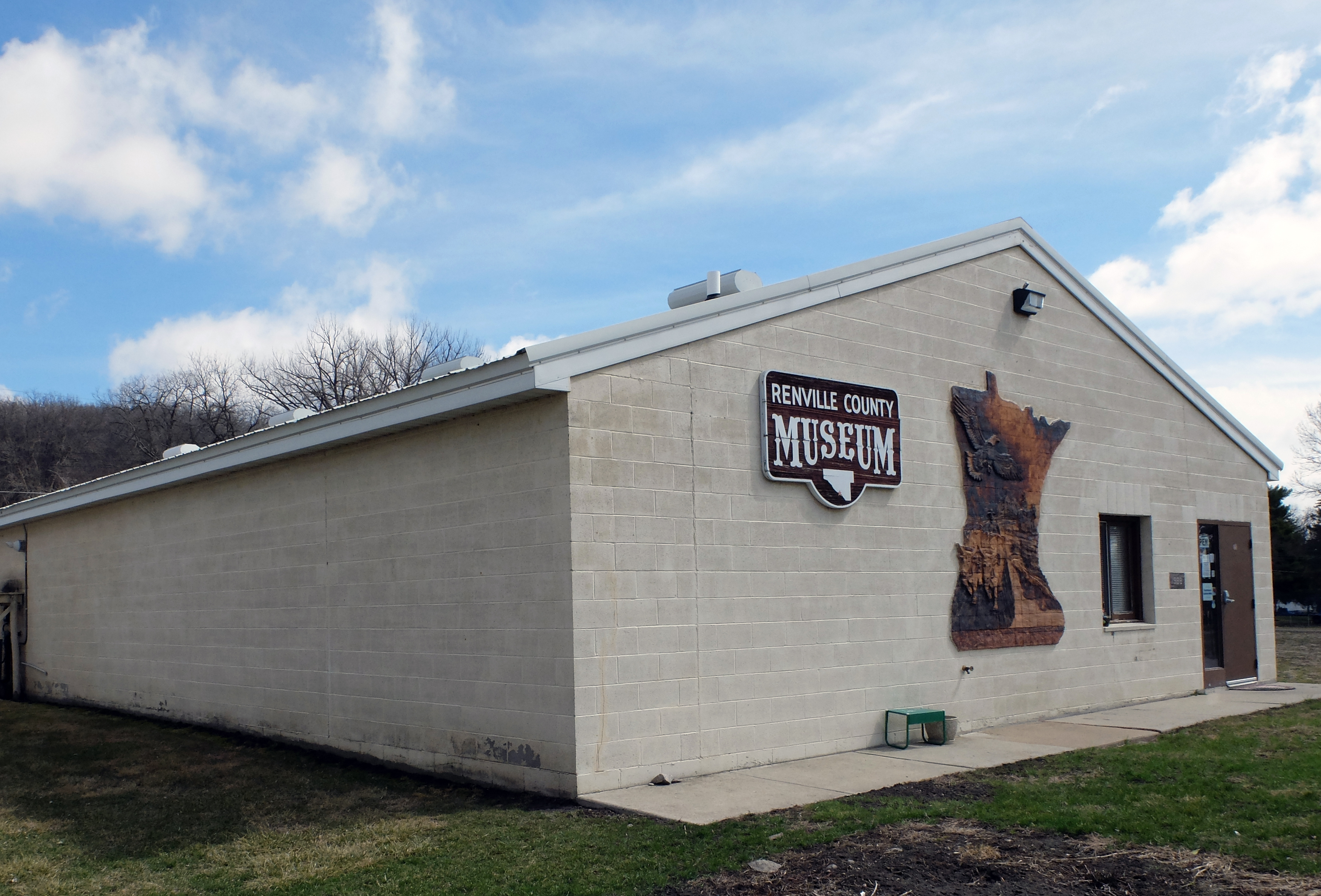
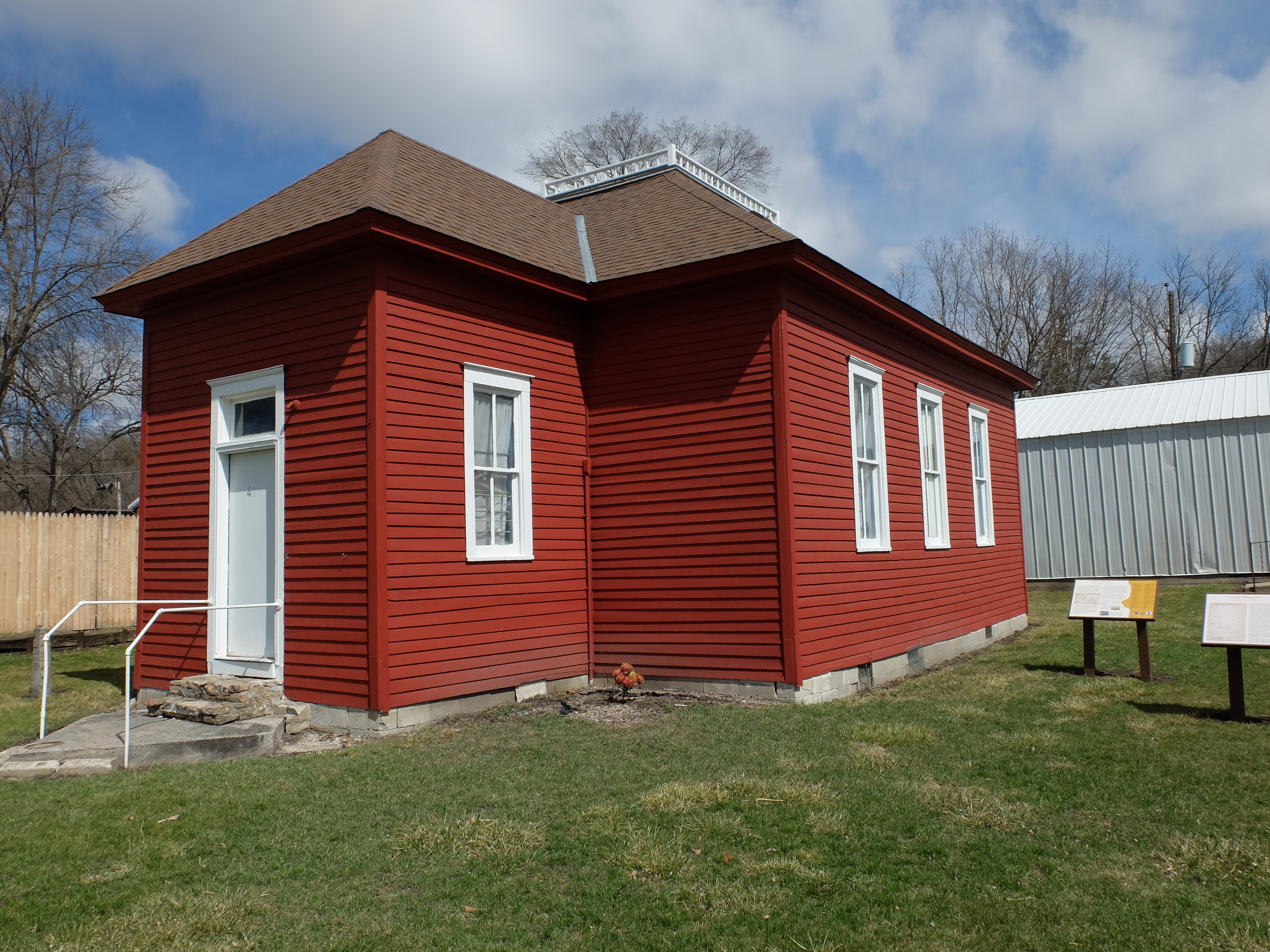
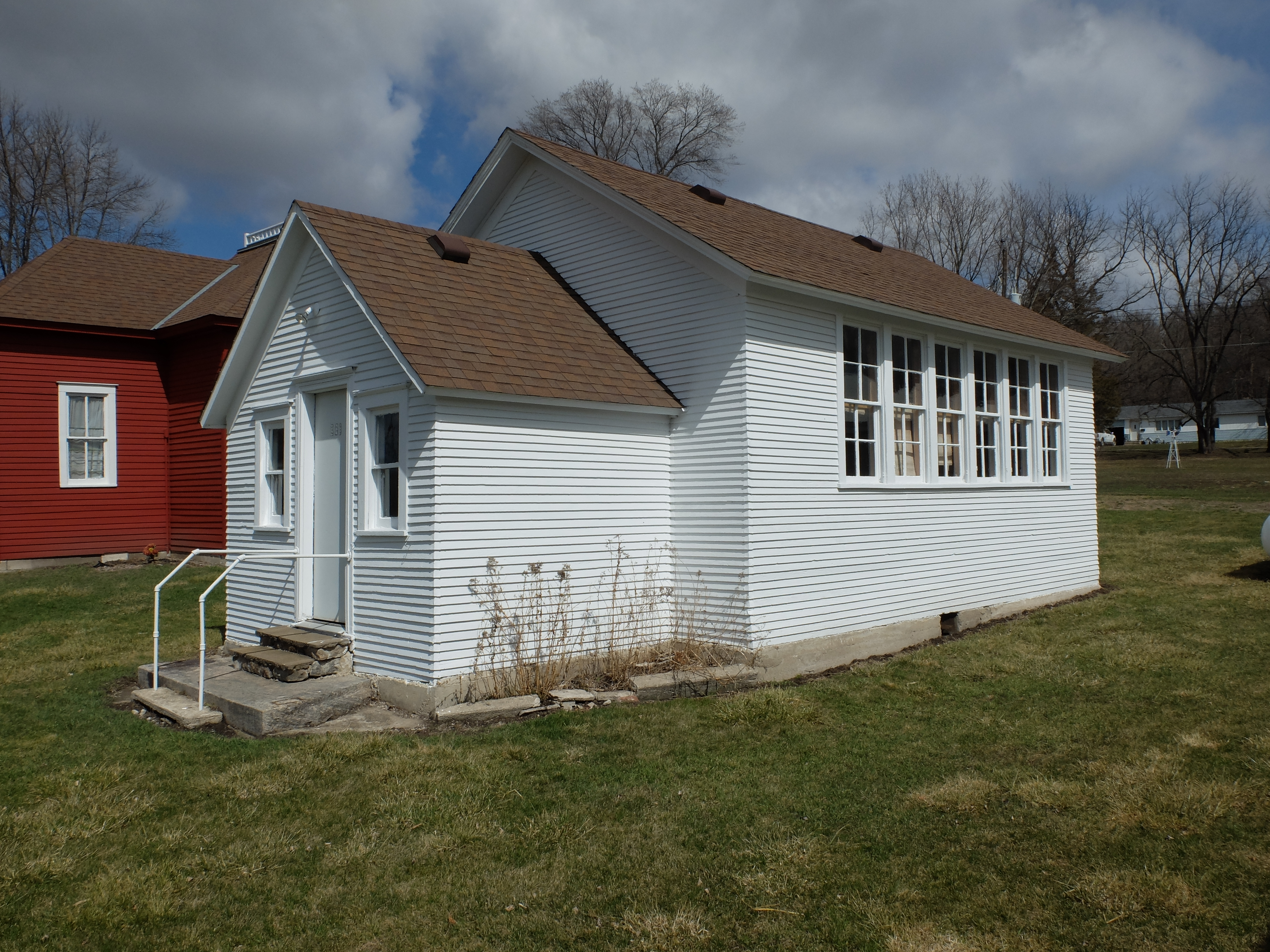
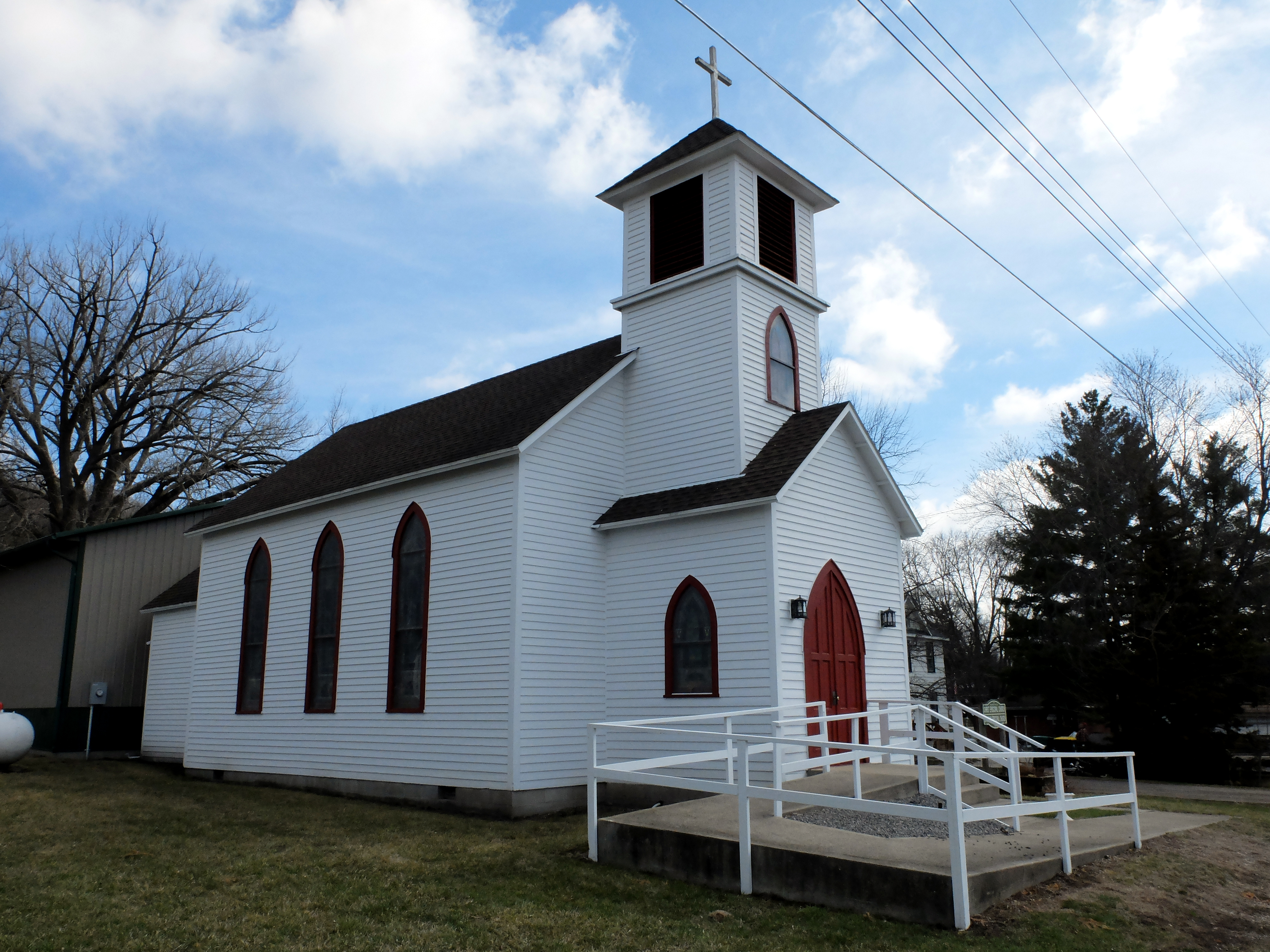
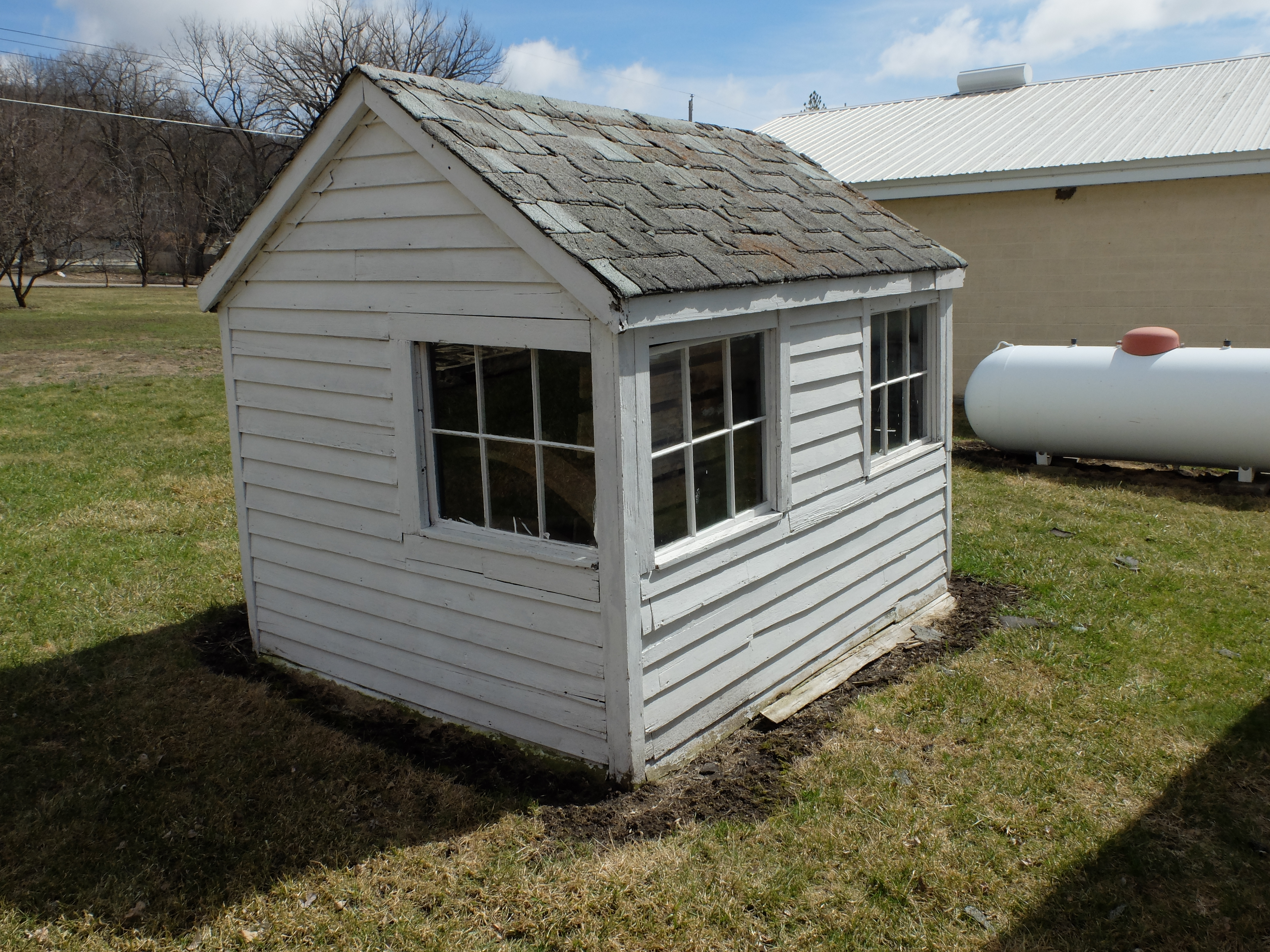
- Renville County Historical Museum Norfolk District 28 Schoolhouse District 36 Schoolhouse St. John's Episcopal Church School outbuilding
- Established: 1940
- Location: 441 N Park Drive, Morton, Minnesota 56270
- Coordinates: 44.555367°N 94.983971°W
- Type: Local History
- Website: renvillecountyhistory.com

The Renville County Historical Museum, located in Morton, Minnesota, is dedicated to preserving and showcasing the history of Renville County. The current main museum building was built in built in 1989 and is operated by the Renville County Historical Society, the museum offers visitors a glimpse into the county's past through a collection of artifacts, photographs, and exhibits.

== History ==
Established from the Old Settlers organization, Renville County Historical Society, initially showcased exhibits at the courthouse in Olivia before World War II interrupted the group's endeavors. Post-war, the historical society successfully established an organization to preserve the county's history.

The main building of the Renville County Historical Museum complex was built in 1989. Before that the Society originally operated out of two repurposed schoolhouses before the construction of the main museum building.

== Museum buildings ==
The museum complex encompasses six buildings, each housing unique exhibits on various aspects of Renville County's history. These buildings include:

- Main Museum: This building houses exhibits on various topics including Bird Island, Minnesota, the old Village of Eddsville, Renville County in World War I, the beginnings of Renville County, and the Fort Ridgely artifacts. It also includes a research library.
- Norfolk Schoolhouse #28: Restored to resemble a one-room country schoolhouse from the past.
- St. John's Episcopal Church: Built in Beaver Falls in 1891. In 1909, the church was moved to Olivia, Minnesota and remolded.
- Heritage Building: Built over the 1869 Lerud Log Cabin, the Heritage Building showcases exhibits on a general store, newspaper equipment, photography equipment, and early automobiles.
- 1879 Schoolhouse: This building features exhibits on pioneer life, Dakota history, wildlife, and local disasters. It also honors Joseph Renville, an early fur trader and scout, and Michael Dowling, an educator and politician.

== Exhibits ==
- The U.S.-Dakota War of 1862: This exhibit sheds light on a significant and often-overlooked conflict in Minnesota's history.
- The Beginnings of Renville County: Explore the early days of settlement and the stories of the county's pioneers.
- Bird Island and Eddsville Village: Learn about these historic communities within Renville County.
- Story of the native rock, gneiss, one of the oldest exposed rock types in the world.
- For the past several years, the society has focused on one of the 10 cities within the county, creating an in-depth exhibit about each of the cities' history.

== Library and archives ==
The Society maintains a comprehensive research library containing Renville County area newspapers on microfilm up to 2009, surname files on Renville County residents, yearbooks, and other resources for genealogical and historical research in addition to overseeing the care of a collection of artifacts, photographs, and archival materials.

== See also ==
- List of museums in Minnesota
