= Crooks Township, Renville County, Minnesota =

Crooks Township, Minnesota
- Township
- Location within the state of Minnesota Crooks Township, Minnesota (the United States)
- Coordinates: 44°50′24″N 95°10′15″W
- Country: United States
- State: Minnesota
- County: Renville

Area
  - Total: 36.1 sq mi (93.5 km^{2})
  - Land: 36.1 sq mi (93.5 km^{2})
  - Water: 0 sq mi (0.0 km^{2})
- Elevation: 1,076 ft (328 m)

Population (2000)
  - Total: 213
  - Density: 6.0/sq mi (2.3/km^{2})
- Time zone: UTC-6 (Central (CST))
  - Summer (DST): UTC-5 (CDT)
- FIPS code: 27-13852
- GNIS feature ID: 0663892

Crooks Township is a township in Renville County, Minnesota, United States. The population was 191 at the 2010 census.

Crooks Township was organized in 1884, and named for H. S. Crooks, a pioneer settler.

== Geography ==
According to the United States Census Bureau, the township has a total area of 36.1 square miles (93 km^{2}), all land.

== Demographics ==
As of the census of 2010, there were 191 people, 68 households, and 55 families residing in the township. The population density was 5.3 inhabitants per square mile (2.0/km^{2}). There were 76 housing units at an average density of 2.1 per square mile (0.81/km^{2}). The racial makeup of the township was 97.4% White.

There were 68 households, out of which 23.5% had children under the age of 18 living with them, 73.5% were married couples living together, 4.4% had a female householder with no husband present, and 19.1% were non-families. 13.2% of all households were made up of individuals, and 33.8% had someone living alone who was 65 years of age or older. The average household size was 2.81 and the average family size was 3.13.

In the township the population was spread out, with 26.2% under the age of 20, 4.7% from 20 to 24, 20.5% from 25 to 44, 31.0% from 45 to 64, and 17.8% who were 65 years of age or older. The median age was 44.2 years. For every 100 males there were 105 females. For every 100 females age 18 and over, there were 102.9 males.

The median income for a household in the township was $46,250, and the median income for a family was $50,000. Males had a median income of $31,607 versus $21,250 for females. The per capita income for the township was $18,019. About 2.9% of families and 4.5% of the population were below the poverty line, including 8.5% of those under the age of eighteen and none of those 65 or over.
