= Morton, Minnesota =

City in Minnesota, United States

Morton
- City
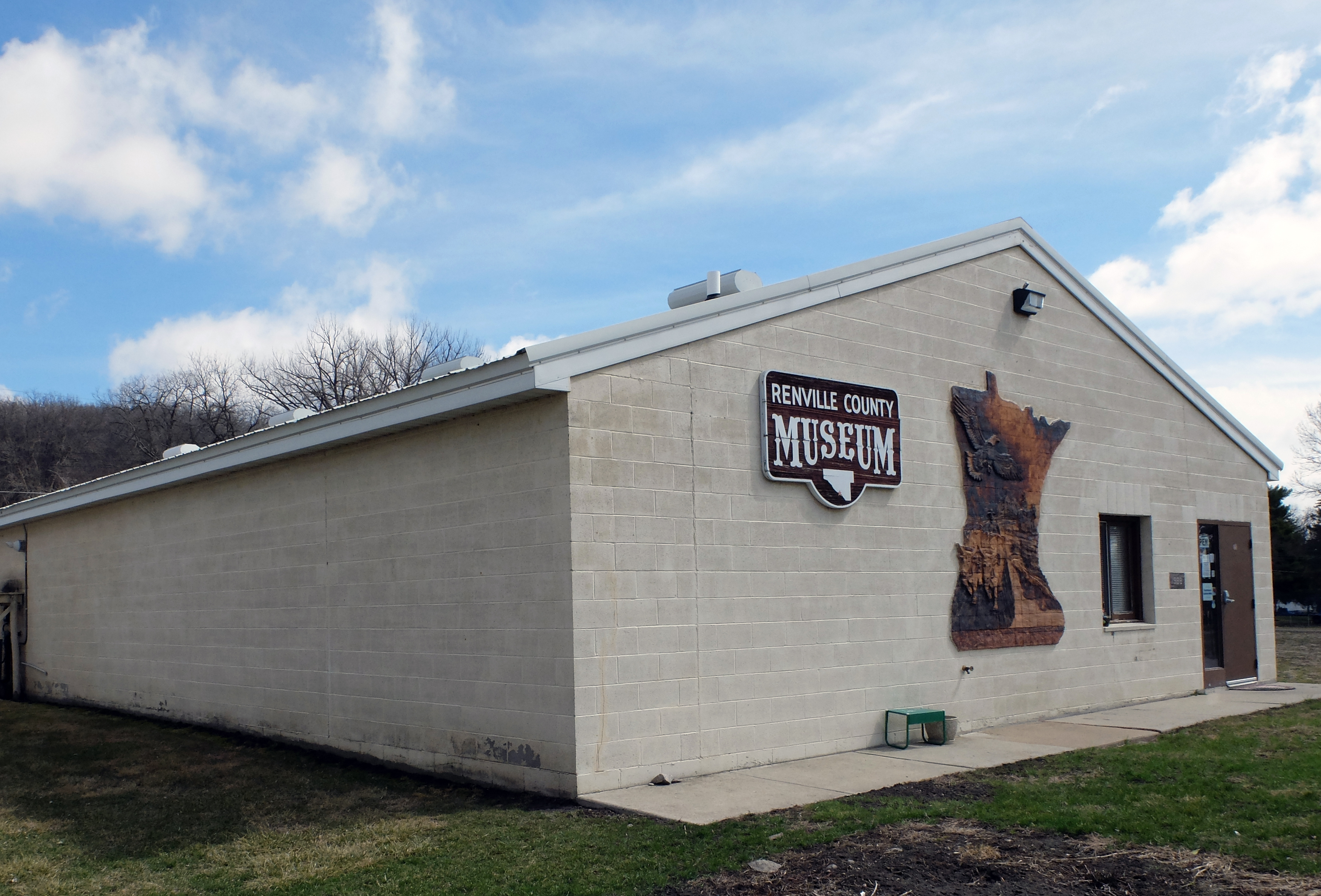
- Renville County Historical Museum in Morton

- Location of Morton, Minnesota
- Coordinates: 44°33′12″N 94°59′06″W
- Country: United States
- State: Minnesota
- County: Renville

Area
  - Total: 1.22 sq mi (3.17 km^{2})
  - Land: 1.21 sq mi (3.14 km^{2})
  - Water: 0.012 sq mi (0.03 km^{2})
- Elevation: 850 ft (260 m)

Population (2020)
  - Total: 410
  - Density: 338.5/sq mi (130.68/km^{2})
- Time zone: UTC-6 (Central (CST))
  - Summer (DST): UTC-5 (CDT)
- ZIP code: 56270
- Area code: 507
- FIPS code: 27-44368
- GNIS feature ID: 2395414
- Website: https://mortonmn.gov/

Morton is a city in Renville County, Minnesota, United States. This city is ninety-five miles southwest of Minneapolis. It is the administrative headquarters of the Lower Sioux Indian Reservation. As of the 2020 census, Morton had a population of 410.

== History ==
Morton was platted in 1882. Morton was incorporated in 1887. Darby Nelson (1940–2022), writer and politician, lived in Morton.

The 1862 Battle of Birch Coulee took place in what would later become the town of Morton and the adjacent Birch Coulee Township.

== Geography ==
According to the United States Census Bureau, the city has a total area of 1.22 square miles (3.16 km^{2}); 1.21 square miles (3.13 km^{2}) is land and 0.01 square miles (0.03 km^{2}) is water.

U.S. Route 71 and Minnesota State Highway 19 are two of the main routes in the community.

== Demographics ==
Historical population
Census	Pop.	Note	%±
1890	453		—
1900	789		74.2%
1910	761		−3.5%
1920	709		−6.8%
1930	756		6.6%
1940	904		19.6%
1950	794		−12.2%
1960	624		−21.4%
1970	591		−5.3%
1980	549		−7.1%
1990	448		−18.4%
2000	442		−1.3%
2010	411		−7.0%
2020	410		−0.2%
U.S. Decennial Census

=== 2010 census ===
As of the census of 2010, there were 411 people, 190 households, and 113 families living in the city. The population density was 339.7 inhabitants per square mile (131.2/km^{2}). There were 211 housing units at an average density of 174.4 per square mile (67.3/km^{2}). The racial makeup of the city was 86.4% White, 8.0% Native American, 1.0% Asian, 1.0% from other races, and 3.6% from two or more races. Hispanic or Latino of any race were 2.9% of the population.

There were 190 households, of which 28.4% had children under the age of 18 living with them, 38.4% were married couples living together, 10.5% had a female householder with no husband present, 10.5% had a male householder with no wife present, and 40.5% were non-families. 34.7% of all households were made up of individuals, and 13.1% had someone living alone who was 65 years of age or older. The average household size was 2.16 and the average family size was 2.72.

The median age in the city was 44.3 years. 22.4% of residents were under the age of 18; 4.4% were between the ages of 18 and 24; 25.1% were from 25 to 44; 31.1% were from 45 to 64; and 17% were 65 years of age or older. The gender makeup of the city was 53.3% male and 46.7% female.

=== 2000 census ===
As of the census of 2000, there were 442 people, 199 households, and 118 families living in the city. The population density was 364.0 inhabitants per square mile (140.5/km^{2}). There were 216 housing units at an average density of 177.9 per square mile (68.7/km^{2}). The racial makeup of the city was 90.05% White, 8.14% Native American, 0.90% from other races, and 0.90% from two or more races. Hispanic or Latino of any race were 6.11% of the population.

There were 199 households, out of which 24.6% had children under the age of 18 living with them, 45.2% were married couples living together, 10.6% had a female householder with no husband present, and 40.7% were non-families. 34.2% of all households were made up of individuals, and 18.6% had someone living alone who was 65 years of age or older. The average household size was 2.22 and the average family size was 2.88.

In the city, the population was spread out, with 23.3% under the age of 18, 8.8% from 18 to 24, 25.1% from 25 to 44, 21.9% from 45 to 64, and 20.8% who were 65 years of age or older. The median age was 41 years. For every 100 females, there were 103.7 males. For every 100 females age 18 and over, there were 101.8 males.

The median income for a household in the city was $35,298, and the median income for a family was $37,396. Males had a median income of $30,938 versus $21,397 for females. The per capita income for the city was $16,899. About 11.5% of families and 8.8% of the population were below the poverty line, including 11.9% of those under age 18 and 9.7% of those age 65 or over.

== Industry ==
Morton is the type locality for Morton Gneiss, one of the world's oldest rock formations. It has been quarried locally since about 1884, achieving popularity for monuments and building façades.
