= Palmyra Township, Renville County, Minnesota =

Palmyra Township, Minnesota
- Township
- Location within the state of Minnesota Palmyra Township, Minnesota (the United States)
- Coordinates: 44°40′51″N 94°48′11″W
- Country: United States
- State: Minnesota
- County: Renville

Area
  - Total: 36.3 sq mi (94.0 km^{2})
  - Land: 36.3 sq mi (94.0 km^{2})
  - Water: 0 sq mi (0.0 km^{2})
- Elevation: 1,112 ft (339 m)

Population (2000)
  - Total: 215
  - Density: 6.0/sq mi (2.3/km^{2})
- Time zone: UTC-6 (Central (CST))
  - Summer (DST): UTC-5 (CDT)
- FIPS code: 27-49606
- GNIS feature ID: 0665252

Palmyra Township is a township in Renville County, Minnesota, United States. The population was 215 at the 2000 census.

== History ==
Palmyra Township was organized in 1872, and named after Palmyra, Wisconsin.

Wallace Gustafson (1925-2018), Minnesota state legislator and lawyer, was born in Palmyra Township.

== Geography ==
According to the United States Census Bureau, the township has a total area of 36.3 square miles (94.0 km^{2}), all land.

== Demographics ==
As of the census of 2000, there were 215 people, 84 households, and 59 families residing in the township. The population density was 5.9 people per square mile (2.3/km^{2}). There were 98 housing units at an average density of 2.7/sq mi (1.0/km^{2}). The racial makeup of the township was 95.81% White, 4.19% from other races. Hispanic or Latino of any race were 4.19% of the population.

There were 84 households, out of which 33.3% had children under the age of 18 living with them, 60.7% were married couples living together, 3.6% had a female householder with no husband present, and 28.6% were non-families. 27.4% of all households were made up of individuals, and 17.9% had someone living alone who was 65 years of age or older. The average household size was 2.56 and the average family size was 3.08.

In the township the population was spread out, with 27.0% under the age of 18, 5.6% from 18 to 24, 26.5% from 25 to 44, 26.0% from 45 to 64, and 14.9% who were 65 years of age or older. The median age was 40 years. For every 100 females, there were 93.7 males. For every 100 females age 18 and over, there were 103.9 males.

The median income for a household in the township was $38,125, and the median income for a family was $45,313. Males had a median income of $33,750 versus $23,125 for females. The per capita income for the township was $18,838. About 6.2% of families and 5.9% of the population were below the poverty line, including none of those under the age of eighteen and 7.4% of those 65 or over.
