= Bandon Township, Renville County, Minnesota =

Bandon Township, Minnesota
- Township
- Location within the state of Minnesota Bandon Township, Minnesota (the United States)
- Coordinates: 44°35′34″N 94°48′25″W
- Country: United States
- State: Minnesota
- County: Renville

Area
  - Total: 36.6 sq mi (94.7 km^{2})
  - Land: 36.6 sq mi (94.7 km^{2})
  - Water: 0 sq mi (0.0 km^{2})
- Elevation: 1,050 ft (320 m)

Population (2000)
  - Total: 202
  - Density: 5.4/sq mi (2.1/km^{2})
- Time zone: UTC-6 (Central (CST))
  - Summer (DST): UTC-5 (CDT)
- FIPS code: 27-03484
- GNIS feature ID: 0663502
- Website: https://bandontownship.com/

Bandon Township is a township in Renville County, Minnesota, United States. The population was 202 at the 2000 census.

Bandon Township was organized in 1871, and named after Bandon, County Cork, Ireland.

== Geography ==
According to the United States Census Bureau, the township has a total area of 36.6 square miles (95 km^{2}), all land.

== Demographics ==
As of the census of 2000, there were 202 people, 75 households, and 59 families residing in the township. The population density was 5.5 inhabitants per square mile (2.1/km^{2}). There were 82 housing units at an average density of 2.2 per square mile (0.85/km^{2}). The racial makeup of the township was 96.53% White, 1.98% from other races, and 1.49% from two or more races. Hispanic or Latino of any race were 3.47% of the population.

There were 75 households, out of which 36.0% had children under the age of 18 living with them, 66.7% were married couples living together, 4.0% had a female householder with no husband present, and 21.3% were non-families. 17.3% of all households were made up of individuals, and 8.0% had someone living alone who was 65 years of age or older. The average household size was 2.69 and the average family size was 3.02.

In the township the population was spread out, with 27.7% under the age of 18, 9.9% from 18 to 24, 28.7% from 25 to 44, 20.8% from 45 to 64, and 12.9% who were 65 years of age or older. The median age was 34 years. For every 100 females, there were 119.6 males. For every 100 females age 18 and over, there were 135.5 males.

The median income for a household in the township was $47,917, and the median income for a family was $50,500. Males had a median income of $30,000 versus $28,125 for females. The per capita income for the township was $16,730. None of the families and 1.9% of the population were living below the poverty line, including no under eighteens and 10.0% of those over 64.
