= Bird Island Township, Renville County, Minnesota =

Bird Island Township, Minnesota
- Township
- Location within the state of Minnesota Bird Island Township, Minnesota (the United States)
- Coordinates: 44°46′21″N 94°56′23″W
- Country: United States
- State: Minnesota
- County: Renville

Area
  - Total: 33.0 sq mi (85.4 km^{2})
  - Land: 33.0 sq mi (85.4 km^{2})
  - Water: 0 sq mi (0.0 km^{2})
- Elevation: 1,080 ft (330 m)

Population (2000)
  - Total: 269
  - Density: 8.0/sq mi (3.1/km^{2})
- Time zone: UTC-6 (Central (CST))
  - Summer (DST): UTC-5 (CDT)
- ZIP code: 55310
- Area code: 320
- FIPS code: 27-06094
- GNIS feature ID: 0663601

Bird Island Township is a township in Renville County, Minnesota, United States. The population was 269 at the 2000 census.

Bird Island Township was organized in 1876, and named for a local bird sanctuary in a marsh.

== Geography ==
According to the United States Census Bureau, the township has a total area of 33.0 square miles (85 km^{2}), all land.

== Demographics ==
As of the census of 2000, there were 269 people, 92 households, and 69 families residing in the township. The population density was 8.2 inhabitants per square mile (3.2/km^{2}). There were 94 housing units at an average density of 2.8 per square mile (1.1/km^{2}). The racial makeup of the township was 97.40% White, 0.74% Native American, 0.37% from other races, and 1.49% from two or more races. Hispanic or Latino of any race were 7.06% of the population.

There were 92 households, out of which 41.3% had children under the age of 18 living with them, 64.1% were married couples living together, 3.3% had a female householder with no husband present, and 25.0% were non-families. 20.7% of all households were made up of individuals, and 9.8% had someone living alone who was 65 years of age or older. The average household size was 2.92 and the average family size was 3.39.

In the township the population was spread out, with 34.9% under the age of 18, 4.8% from 18 to 24, 30.1% from 25 to 44, 21.2% from 45 to 64, and 8.9% who were 65 years of age or older. The median age was 34 years. For every 100 females, there were 106.9 males. For every 100 females age 18 and over, there were 110.8 males.

The median income for a household in the township was $42,083, and the median income for a family was $48,750. Males had a median income of $34,688 versus $22,500 for females. The per capita income for the township was $23,826. None of the families and 0.9% of the population were living below the poverty line.
