= Emmet Township, Renville County, Minnesota =

Emmet Township, Minnesota
- Township
- Location within the state of Minnesota Emmet Township, Minnesota (the United States)
- Coordinates: 44°46′2″N 95°10′33″W
- Country: United States
- State: Minnesota
- County: Renville

Area
  - Total: 34.7 sq mi (90.0 km^{2})
  - Land: 34.7 sq mi (90.0 km^{2})
  - Water: 0 sq mi (0.0 km^{2})
- Elevation: 1,063 ft (324 m)

Population (2000)
  - Total: 259
  - Density: 7.5/sq mi (2.9/km^{2})
- Time zone: UTC-6 (Central (CST))
  - Summer (DST): UTC-5 (CDT)
- FIPS code: 27-19322
- GNIS feature ID: 0664097

Emmet Township is a township in Renville County, Minnesota, United States. The population was 259 at the 2000 census.

Emmet Township was organized in 1870, and named for Robert Emmet, leader of the 1803 Irish rebellion.

== Geography ==
According to the United States Census Bureau, the township has a total area of 34.8 square miles (90 km^{2}), all land.

== Demographics ==
As of the census of 2000, there were 259 people, 94 households, and 75 families residing in the township. The population density was 7.5 inhabitants per square mile (2.9/km^{2}). There were 109 housing units at an average density of 3.1 per square mile (1.2/km^{2}). The racial makeup of the township was 93.82% White, 0.39% Native American, 5.79% from other races. Hispanic or Latino of any race were 5.79% of the population.

There were 94 households, out of which 38.3% had children under the age of 18 living with them, 71.3% were married couples living together, 2.1% had a female householder with no husband present, and 20.2% were non-families. 17.0% of all households were made up of individuals, and 9.6% had someone living alone who was 65 years of age or older. The average household size was 2.76 and the average family size was 3.13.

In the township the population was spread out, with 27.8% under the age of 18, 9.3% from 18 to 24, 24.7% from 25 to 44, 25.1% from 45 to 64, and 13.1% who were 65 years of age or older. The median age was 38 years. For every 100 females, there were 108.9 males. For every 100 females age 18 and over, there were 110.1 males.

The median income for a household in the township was $37,500, and the median income for a family was $43,438. Males had a median income of $27,813 versus $19,722 for females. The per capita income for the township was $16,276. About 11.4% of families and 11.5% of the population were below the poverty line, including 18.3% of those under the age of eighteen and 8.7% of those 65 or over.
