= Brookfield Township, Renville County, Minnesota =

Brookfield Township, Minnesota
- Township
- Location within the state of Minnesota Brookfield Township, Minnesota (the United States)
- Coordinates: 44°49′54″N 94°41′36″W
- Country: United States
- State: Minnesota
- County: Renville

Area
  - Total: 36.1 sq mi (93.6 km^{2})
  - Land: 36.1 sq mi (93.6 km^{2})
  - Water: 0 sq mi (0.0 km^{2})
- Elevation: 1,099 ft (335 m)

Population (2000)
  - Total: 163
  - Density: 4.4/sq mi (1.7/km^{2})
- Time zone: UTC-6 (Central (CST))
  - Summer (DST): UTC-5 (CDT)
- FIPS code: 27-07912
- GNIS feature ID: 0663670

Brookfield Township is a township in Renville County, Minnesota, United States. The population was 163 at the 2000 census.

Brookfield Township was organized in 1874.

== Geography ==
According to the United States Census Bureau, the township has a total area of 36.2 square miles (94 km^{2}), of which 36.2 square miles (94 km^{2}) is land and 0.03% is water.

== Demographics ==
As of the census of 2000, there were 163 people, 72 households, and 55 families residing in the township. The population density was 4.5 inhabitants per square mile (1.7/km^{2}). There were 83 housing units at an average density of 2.3 per square mile (0.89/km^{2}). The racial makeup of the township was 99.39% White, and 0.61% from two or more races.

There were 72 households, out of which 20.8% had children under the age of 18 living with them, 68.1% were married couples living together, 2.8% had a female householder with no husband present, and 23.6% were non-families. 20.8% of all households were made up of individuals, and 6.9% had someone living alone who was 65 years of age or older. The average household size was 2.26 and the average family size was 2.58.

In the township the population was spread out, with 19.0% under the age of 18, 6.7% from 18 to 24, 24.5% from 25 to 44, 29.4% from 45 to 64, and 20.2% who were 65 years of age or older. The median age was 45 years. For every 100 females, there were 123.3 males. For every 100 females age 18 and over, there were 116.4 males.

The median income for a household in the township was $39,444, and the median income for a family was $39,167. Males had a median income of $30,208 versus $16,250 for females. The per capita income for the township was $16,628. About 8.6% of families and 17.6% of the population were below the poverty line, including 35.0% of those under the age of eighteen and 9.1% of those 65 or over.
