= Wang Township, Renville County, Minnesota =

Wang Township, Minnesota
- Township
- Location within the state of Minnesota Wang Township, Minnesota (the United States)
- Coordinates: 44°51′14″N 95°25′36″W
- Country: United States
- State: Minnesota
- County: Renville

Area
  - Total: 36.2 sq mi (93.8 km^{2})
  - Land: 36.2 sq mi (93.8 km^{2})
  - Water: 0 sq mi (0.0 km^{2})
- Elevation: 1,037 ft (316 m)

Population (2020)
  - Total: 246
  - Density: 6.8/sq mi (2.6/km^{2})
- Time zone: UTC-6 (Central (CST))
  - Summer (DST): UTC-5 (CDT)
- FIPS code: 27-68026
- GNIS feature ID: 0665912

Wang Township is a township in Renville County, Minnesota, United States. The population is 246 as of the 2020 census.

Wang Township was organized in 1875, and named after a district or group of farms in Norway.

== Geography ==
According to the United States Census Bureau, the township has a total area of 36.2 square miles (94 km^{2}).

== Demographics ==
As of the 2020 census and 2024 American Community Survey's 5-year Estimates, there are 246 people and 97 households residing in the township. The population density was 6.8 per square mile (2.6/km^{2}). There are 101 housing units at an average density of 3.4 per square mile (1.3/km^{2}). The racial make-up of the township is 96.34% White and 3.66% from other races. Hispanic or Latino of any race were 1.22% of the population.

There were 97 households, of which 32.8% had children under the age of 18 living with them, 76.3% were married couples living together, 4.1% had a female householder with no husband present and 16.5% were non-families. 12.4% of all households were made up of individuals, and 5.2% had someone living alone who was 65 years of age or older. The average household size was 2.79 and the average family size was 3.07 people.

32.8% of the population were under the age of 18, 1.5% from 18 to 24, 22.1% from 25 to 44, 19.9% from 45 to 64 and 23.6% were 65 years of age or older. The median age was 40.5 years. For every 100 females, there were 88.2 males.

The median household income was $98,438 and the median family income was $103,594. About 5.5% of the population were below the poverty line, including 3.4% of those under the age of eighteen and 7.8% of those 65 or over.
