= Melville Township, Renville County, Minnesota =

Melville Township, Minnesota
- Township
- Location within the state of Minnesota Melville Township, Minnesota (the United States)
- Coordinates: 44°45′31″N 94°48′11″W
- Country: United States
- State: Minnesota
- County: Renville

Area
  - Total: 36.3 sq mi (94.1 km^{2})
  - Land: 36.3 sq mi (94.1 km^{2})
  - Water: 0 sq mi (0.0 km^{2})
- Elevation: 1,079 ft (329 m)

Population (2000)
  - Total: 242
  - Density: 6.7/sq mi (2.6/km^{2})
- Time zone: UTC-6 (Central (CST))
  - Summer (DST): UTC-5 (CDT)
- FIPS code: 27-41624
- GNIS feature ID: 0664955

Melville Township is a township in Renville County, Minnesota, United States. The population was 242 at the 2000 census.

Melville Township was organized in 1878.

== Geography ==
According to the United States Census Bureau, the township has a total area of 36.3 square miles (94.1 km^{2}), all land.

== Demographics ==
As of the census of 2000, there were 242 people, 94 households, and 70 families residing in the township. The population density was 6.7 inhabitants per square mile (2.6/km^{2}). There were 104 housing units at an average density of 2.9 per square mile (1.1/km^{2}). The racial makeup of the township was 100.00% White.

There were 94 households, out of which 31.9% had children under the age of 18 living with them, 70.2% were married couples living together, and 25.5% were non-families. 24.5% of all households were made up of individuals, and 10.6% had someone living alone who was 65 years of age or older. The average household size was 2.57 and the average family size was 3.09.

In the township the population was spread out, with 27.7% under the age of 18, 3.7% from 18 to 24, 28.5% from 25 to 44, 22.7% from 45 to 64, and 17.4% who were 65 years of age or older. The median age was 39 years. For every 100 females, there were 106.8 males. For every 100 females age 18 and over, there were 121.5 males.

The median income for a household in the township was $40,893, and the median income for a family was $50,000. Males had a median income of $33,125 versus $32,917 for females. The per capita income for the township was $18,676. About 5.6% of families and 5.7% of the population were below the poverty line, including 5.9% of those under the age of eighteen and none of those 65 or over.
