= Troy Township, Renville County, Minnesota =

Troy Township, Minnesota
- Township
- Location within the state of Minnesota Troy Township, Minnesota (the United States)
- Coordinates: 44°45′59″N 95°3′59″W
- Country: United States
- State: Minnesota
- County: Renville

Area
  - Total: 34.8 sq mi (90.2 km^{2})
  - Land: 34.8 sq mi (90.1 km^{2})
  - Water: 0.039 sq mi (0.1 km^{2})
- Elevation: 1,079 ft (329 m)

Population (2000)
  - Total: 325
  - Density: 9.3/sq mi (3.6/km^{2})
- Time zone: UTC-6 (Central (CST))
  - Summer (DST): UTC-5 (CDT)
- FIPS code: 27-65632
- GNIS feature ID: 0665813

Troy Township is a township in Renville County, Minnesota, United States. The population was 325 at the 2000 census.

Troy Township was organized in 1876.

== Geography ==
According to the United States Census Bureau, the township has a total area of 34.8 square miles (90.2 km^{2}), of which 34.8 square miles (90.1 km^{2}) is land and 0.04 square mile (0.1 km^{2}) (0.09%) is water.

== Demographics ==
As of the census of 2000, there were 325 people, 112 households, and 91 families residing in the township. The population density was 9.3 people per square mile (3.6/km^{2}). There were 116 housing units at an average density of 3.3/sq mi (1.3/km^{2}). The racial makeup of the township was 95.38% White, 0.31% Asian, 4.31% from other races. Hispanic or Latino of any race were 5.54% of the population.

There were 112 households, out of which 40.2% had children under the age of 18 living with them, 73.2% were married couples living together, 4.5% had a female householder with no husband present, and 18.8% were non-families. 17.9% of all households were made up of individuals, and 10.7% had someone living alone who was 65 years of age or older. The average household size was 2.90 and the average family size was 3.30.

In the township the population was spread out, with 32.0% under the age of 18, 5.8% from 18 to 24, 25.5% from 25 to 44, 21.8% from 45 to 64, and 14.8% who were 65 years of age or older. The median age was 35 years. For every 100 females, there were 119.6 males. For every 100 females age 18 and over, there were 104.6 males.

The median income for a household in the township was $47,083, and the median income for a family was $58,750. Males had a median income of $31,667 versus $23,125 for females. The per capita income for the township was $23,803. About 8.1% of families and 7.6% of the population were below the poverty line, including 9.7% of those under age 18 and 9.5% of those age 65 or over.
