= Ericson Township, Renville County, Minnesota =

Ericson Township, Minnesota
- Township
- Location within the state of Minnesota Ericson Township, Minnesota (the United States)
- Coordinates: 44°50′54″N 95°17′27″W
- Country: United States
- State: Minnesota
- County: Renville

Area
  - Total: 36.3 sq mi (94.1 km^{2})
  - Land: 36.3 sq mi (94.0 km^{2})
  - Water: 0.039 sq mi (0.1 km^{2})
- Elevation: 1,066 ft (325 m)

Population (2000)
  - Total: 253
  - Density: 7.0/sq mi (2.7/km^{2})
- Time zone: UTC-6 (Central (CST))
  - Summer (DST): UTC-5 (CDT)
- FIPS code: 27-19628
- GNIS feature ID: 0664106

Ericson Township is a township in Renville County, Minnesota, United States. The population was 253 at the 2000 census.

Ericson Township was organized in 1874, and named for Eric Ericson, an early settler.

== Geography ==
According to the United States Census Bureau, the township has a total area of 36.3 square miles (94 km^{2}), of which 36.3 square miles (94 km^{2}) is land and 0.04 square miles (0.10 km^{2}) (0.08%) is water.

== Demographics ==
As of the census of 2000, there were 253 people, 88 households, and 73 families residing in the township. The population density was 7.0 inhabitants per square mile (2.7/km^{2}). There were 98 housing units at an average density of 2.7 per square mile (1.0/km^{2}). The racial makeup of the township was 98.02% White, 1.19% Asian, 0.40% Pacific Islander, and 0.40% from two or more races. Hispanic or Latino of any race were 0.79% of the population.

There were 88 households, out of which 35.2% had children under the age of 18 living with them, 72.7% were married couples living together, 2.3% had a female householder with no husband present, and 17.0% were non-families. 17.0% of all households were made up of individuals, and 9.1% had someone living alone who was 65 years of age or older. The average household size was 2.88 and the average family size was 3.18.

In the township the population was spread out, with 26.9% under the age of 18, 9.5% from 18 to 24, 26.5% from 25 to 44, 24.5% from 45 to 64, and 12.6% who were 65 years of age or older. The median age was 38 years. For every 100 females, there were 121.9 males. For every 100 females age 18 and over, there were 117.6 males.

The median income for a household in the township was $51,250, and the median income for a family was $51,458. Males had a median income of $28,750 versus $25,357 for females. The per capita income for the township was $21,454. About 5.5% of families and 4.1% of the population were below the poverty line, including none of those under the age of eighteen and 12.1% of those 65 or over.
