= Osceola Township, Renville County, Minnesota =

Osceola Township, Minnesota
- Township
- Location within the state of Minnesota Osceola Township, Minnesota (the United States)
- Coordinates: 44°50′35″N 94°48′56″W
- Country: United States
- State: Minnesota
- County: Renville

Area
  - Total: 36.3 sq mi (94.0 km^{2})
  - Land: 36.3 sq mi (94.0 km^{2})
  - Water: 0 sq mi (0.0 km^{2})
- Elevation: 1,112 ft (339 m)

Population (2000)
  - Total: 219
  - Density: 6.0/sq mi (2.3/km^{2})
- Time zone: UTC-6 (Central (CST))
  - Summer (DST): UTC-5 (CDT)
- FIPS code: 27-48868
- GNIS feature ID: 0665228

Osceola Township (/ˌɒsiˈoʊlə/ OSS-ee-OH-lə) is a township in Renville County, Minnesota, United States. At the 2000 census, the township population was 219.

Osceola Township was organized in 1879, and named after Osceola, Wisconsin.

== Geography ==
According to the United States Census Bureau, the township has a total area of 36.3 square miles (94.0 km^{2}), all land.

== Demographics ==
As of the census of 2000, there were 219 people, 79 households, and 57 families residing in the township. The population density was 6.0 people per square mile (2.3/km^{2}). There were 100 housing units at an average density of 2.8/sq mi (1.1/km^{2}). The racial makeup of the township was 100.00% White. Hispanic or Latino of any race were 0.46% of the population.

There were 79 households, out of which 38.0% had children under the age of 18 living with them, 65.8% were married couples living together, 2.5% had a female householder with no husband present, and 26.6% were non-families. 24.1% of all households were made up of individuals, and 8.9% had someone living alone who was 65 years of age or older. The average household size was 2.77 and the average family size was 3.29.

In the township the population was spread out, with 32.4% under the age of 18, 5.0% from 18 to 24, 30.1% from 25 to 44, 19.2% from 45 to 64, and 13.2% who were 65 years of age or older. The median age was 38 years. For every 100 females, there were 100.9 males. For every 100 females age 18 and over, there were 117.6 males.

The median income for a household in the township was $47,917, and the median income for a family was $37,500. Males had a median income of $51,250 versus $21,250 for females. The per capita income for the township was $18,687. About 19.6% of families and 17.9% of the population were below the poverty line, including 27.1% of those under the age of eighteen and 12.1% of those 65 or over.
