= Flora Township, Renville County, Minnesota =

Flora Township, Minnesota
- Township
- Location within the state of Minnesota Flora Township, Minnesota (the United States)
- Coordinates: 44°39′22″N 95°10′23″W
- Country: United States
- State: Minnesota
- County: Renville

Area
  - Total: 37.9 sq mi (98.1 km^{2})
  - Land: 37.8 sq mi (97.8 km^{2})
  - Water: 0.12 sq mi (0.3 km^{2})
- Elevation: 1,060 ft (323 m)

Population (2000)
  - Total: 245
  - Density: 6.5/sq mi (2.5/km^{2})
- Time zone: UTC-6 (Central (CST))
  - Summer (DST): UTC-5 (CDT)
- FIPS code: 27-21374
- GNIS feature ID: 0664179

Flora Township is a township in Renville County, Minnesota, United States. The population was 245 at the 2000 census.

Flora Township was organized in 1867, and named after a local horse.

== Geography ==
According to the United States Census Bureau, the township has a total area of 37.9 square miles (98 km^{2}), of which 37.8 square miles (98 km^{2}) is land and 0.1 square miles (0.26 km^{2}) (0.26%) is water.

== Demographics ==
As of the census of 2000, there were 245 people, 83 households, and 73 families residing in the township. The population density was 6.5 inhabitants per square mile (2.5/km^{2}). There were 88 housing units at an average density of 2.3 per square mile (0.89/km^{2}). The racial makeup of the township was 90.61% White, 1.22% Asian, 8.16% from other races. Hispanic or Latino of any race were 8.16% of the population.

There were 83 households, out of which 37.3% had children under the age of 18 living with them, 79.5% were married couples living together, 3.6% had a female householder with no husband present, and 12.0% were non-families. 7.2% of all households were made up of individuals, and 4.8% had someone living alone who was 65 years of age or older. The average household size was 2.95 and the average family size was 3.01.

In the township the population was spread out, with 29.4% under the age of 18, 5.7% from 18 to 24, 24.5% from 25 to 44, 26.1% from 45 to 64, and 14.3% who were 65 years of age or older. The median age was 40 years. For every 100 females, there were 109.4 males. For every 100 females age 18 and over, there were 106.0 males.

The median income for a household in the township was $40,625, and the median income for a family was $42,679. Males had a median income of $27,708 versus $16,875 for females. The per capita income for the township was $13,065. About 2.4% of families and 5.8% of the population were below the poverty line, including 2.2% of those under the age of eighteen and 8.0% of those 65 or over.
