= Winfield Township, Renville County, Minnesota =

Winfield Township, Minnesota
- Township
- Location within the state of Minnesota Winfield Township, Minnesota (the United States)
- Coordinates: 44°51′1″N 95°3′41″W
- Country: United States
- State: Minnesota
- County: Renville

Area
  - Total: 36.6 sq mi (94.7 km^{2})
  - Land: 36.5 sq mi (94.6 km^{2})
  - Water: 0.039 sq mi (0.1 km^{2})
- Elevation: 1,099 ft (335 m)

Population (2000)
  - Total: 252
  - Density: 7.0/sq mi (2.7/km^{2})
- Time zone: UTC-6 (Central (CST))
  - Summer (DST): UTC-5 (CDT)
- FIPS code: 27-70852
- GNIS feature ID: 0666017

Winfield Township is a township in Renville County, Minnesota, United States. The population was 252 at the 2000 census.

Winfield Township was organized in 1878, and named for Winfield Scott (1786-1866), United States Army general and candidate for the presidency of the United States.

== Geography ==
According to the United States Census Bureau, the township has a total area of 36.6 square miles (94.7 km^{2}), of which 36.5 square miles (94.6 km^{2}) is land and 0.1 square mile (0.1 km^{2}) (0.14%) is water.

== Demographics ==
As of the census of 2000, there were 252 people, 90 households, and 72 families residing in the township. The population density was 6.9 people per square mile (2.7/km^{2}). There were 91 housing units at an average density of 2.5/sq mi (1.0/km^{2}). The racial makeup of the township was 98.02% White and 1.98% Asian. Hispanic or Latino of any race were 1.98% of the population.

There were 90 households, out of which 40.0% had children under the age of 18 living with them, 70.0% were married couples living together, 4.4% had a female householder with no husband present, and 20.0% were non-families. 16.7% of all households were made up of individuals, and 4.4% had someone living alone who was 65 years of age or older. The average household size was 2.80 and the average family size was 3.11.

In the township the population was spread out, with 28.2% under the age of 18, 6.7% from 18 to 24, 29.8% from 25 to 44, 23.0% from 45 to 64, and 12.3% who were 65 years of age or older. The median age was 38 years. For every 100 females, there were 125.0 males. For every 100 females age 18 and over, there were 135.1 males.

The median income for a household in the township was $35,893, and the median income for a family was $39,000. Males had a median income of $25,769 versus $17,188 for females. The per capita income for the township was $15,181. About 8.8% of families and 7.6% of the population were below the poverty line, including none of those under the age of eighteen and 13.8% of those 65 or over.
