= Renville County, Minnesota =

County in Minnesota, United States

- County
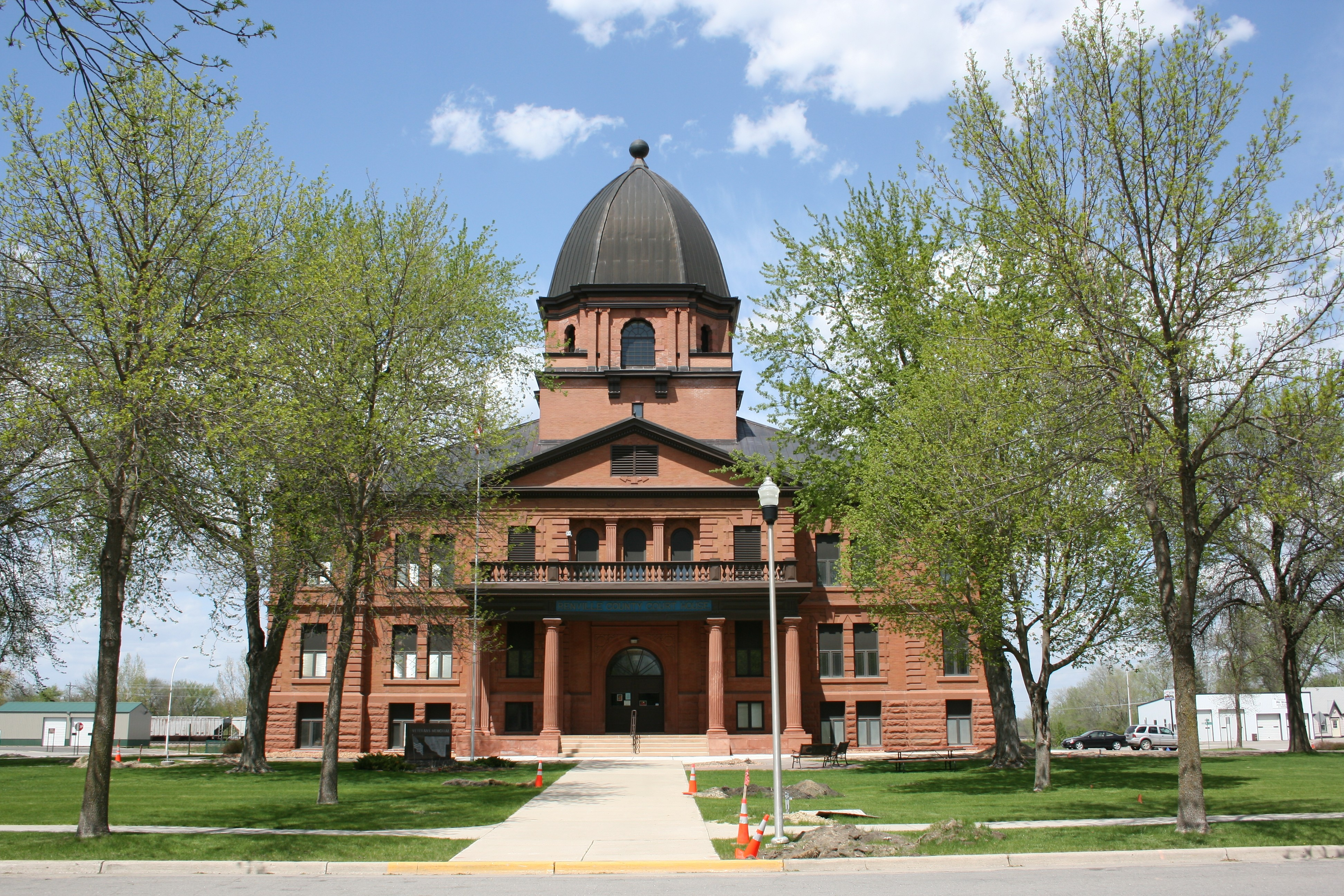
- Renville County Courthouse

- Location within the U.S. state of Minnesota
- Coordinates: 44°43′N 94°58′W
- Country: United States
- State: Minnesota
- Created: February 20, 1855
- Organized: November 8, 1866
- Named for: Joseph Renville
- Seat: Olivia
- Largest city: Olivia

Area
  - Total: 987 sq mi (2,560 km^{2})
  - Land: 983 sq mi (2,550 km^{2})
  - Water: 4.2 sq mi (11 km^{2}) 0.4%

Population (2020)
  - Total: 14,723
  - Estimate (2025): 14,356 ▼
  - Density: 15/sq mi (5.8/km^{2})
- Time zone: UTC−6 (Central)
  - Summer (DST): UTC−5 (CDT)
- Congressional district: 7th
- Website: www.renvillecountymn.gov

Renville County is a county in the U.S. state of Minnesota. As of the 2020 census the population was 14,723. Its county seat is Olivia.

== History ==
The Minnesota Territory legislature created the county on February 20, 1855. It was named for Joseph Renville, a fur trapper, trader, British officer in the War of 1812, and interlocutor with local Native American groups. Organization of the county's governing structure was completed on November 8, 1866, with Beaver Falls as county seat. Beginning in 1885, citizens in and around Olivia began pressing for the seat to be moved to Olivia, which happened in 1900.

=== 1862 Dakota War ===
Renville County, located directly across the Minnesota River from the Lower Sioux Agency, was the site of extensive combat during the Dakota War of 1862. The U.S. army's defeats at the Battle of Redwood Ferry and the Battle of Birch Coulee at the hands of the Dakota both occurred in Birch Cooley Township, in addition to numerous Dakota raids on white homesteads in the county. The burned-out Joseph Brown House Ruins still stand, and various monuments throughout the County memorialize settlers killed in the conflict.

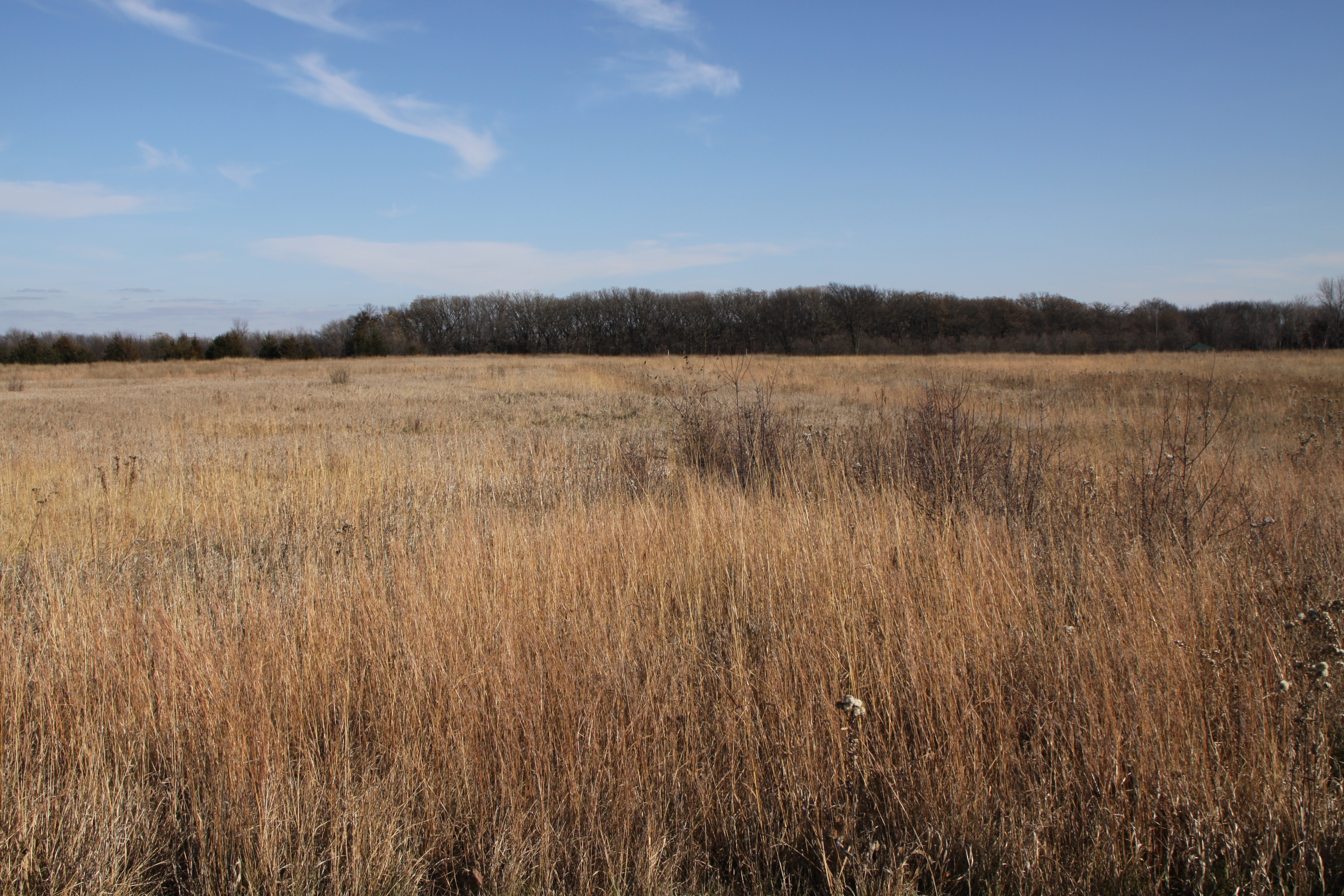
Birch Coulee Battlefield near Morton

== Geography ==
The Minnesota River flows southeast along the county's southwestern border. Hawk Creek flows south through the county's western end, discharging into the Minnesota. Beaver Creek drains the central part of the county, flowing southeast before turning southwest to discharge into the Minnesota. The county terrain consists of rolling hills etched by drainages and sprinkled with lakes and ponds. The area is devoted to agriculture. The county terrain slopes to the south, with its highest point near the midpoint of the northern border, at 1,122 ft (342 m) ASL. The county has a total area of 987 square miles (2,560 km^{2}), of which 983 square miles (2,550 km^{2}) is land and 4.2 square miles (11 km^{2}) (0.4%) is water.

Soils of Renville County

=== Major highways ===
- U.S. Highway 71
- U.S. Highway 212
- Minnesota State Highway 4
- Minnesota State Highway 19
- Minnesota State Highway 23

=== Adjacent counties ===
- Kandiyohi County - north
- Meeker County - northeast
- McLeod County - east
- Sibley County - southeast
- Nicollet County - southeast
- Brown County - south
- Redwood County - southwest
- Yellow Medicine County - west
- Chippewa County - northwest

Renville, Beltrami, and Stearns are Minnesota's only counties that abut nine other counties.

=== Lakes ===
- Beckendorf Lake
- Boon Lake
- Hodgson Lake
- Lake Allie
- Mud Lake
- Phare Lake
- Preston Lake
- Round Grove Lake (part)
- Round Lake

=== Protected areas ===
- Beaver Falls County Park
- Camp Town Park
- County Park No. 2
- County Park No. 4
- Fort Ridgely State Park (part)
- Birch Coulee Battlefield
- Prieve State Wildlife Management Area (part)
- Skalbekken County Park

== Demographics ==
Historical population
Census	Pop.	Note	%±
1860	245		—
1870	3,219		1,213.9%
1880	10,791		235.2%
1890	17,099		58.5%
1900	23,693		38.6%
1910	23,123		−2.4%
1920	23,634		2.2%
1930	23,645		0.0%
1940	24,625		4.1%
1950	23,954		−2.7%
1960	23,249		−2.9%
1970	21,139		−9.1%
1980	20,401		−3.5%
1990	17,673		−13.4%
2000	17,154		−2.9%
2010	15,730		−8.3%
2020	14,723		−6.4%
2025 (est.)	14,356	▼	−2.5%
U.S. Decennial Census; 1790-1960 1900-1990; 1990-2000 2010-2020

=== Racial and ethnic composition ===
Renville County, Minnesota – Racial and ethnic composition Note: the US Census treats Hispanic/Latino as an ethnic category. This table excludes Latinos from the racial categories and assigns them to a separate category. Hispanics/Latinos may be of any race.
Race / Ethnicity (NH = Non-Hispanic)	Pop 1980	Pop 1990	Pop 2000	Pop 2010	Pop 2020	% 1980	% 1990	% 2000	% 2010	% 2020
White alone (NH)	20,201	17,345	16,085	14,351	12,766	99.02%	98.14%	93.77%	91.23%	86.71%
Black or African American alone (NH)	4	6	10	40	60	0.02%	0.03%	0.06%	0.25%	0.41%
Native American or Alaska Native alone (NH)	52	55	75	76	103	0.25%	0.31%	0.44%	0.48%	0.70%
Asian alone (NH)	27	46	30	54	61	0.13%	0.26%	0.17%	0.34%	0.41%
Native Hawaiian or Pacific Islander alone (NH)	x	x	2	4	5	x	x	0.01%	0.03%	0.03%
Other race alone (NH)	0	5	2	9	27	0.00%	0.03%	0.01%	0.06%	0.18%
Mixed race or Multiracial (NH)	x	x	74	150	382	x	x	0.43%	0.95%	2.59%
Hispanic or Latino (any race)	117	216	876	1,046	1,319	0.57%	1.22%	5.11%	6.65%	8.96%
Total	20,401	17,673	17,154	15,730	14,723	100.00%	100.00%	100.00%	100.00%	100.00%

=== 2020 census ===
As of the 2020 census, the county had a population of 14,723. The median age was 43.7 years. 22.9% of residents were under the age of 18 and 21.8% of residents were 65 years of age or older. For every 100 females there were 103.2 males, and for every 100 females age 18 and over there were 103.1 males age 18 and over.

The racial makeup of the county was 89.4% White, 0.5% Black or African American, 0.9% American Indian and Alaska Native, 0.5% Asian, <0.1% Native Hawaiian and Pacific Islander, 3.4% from some other race, and 5.4% from two or more races. Hispanic or Latino residents of any race comprised 9.0% of the population.

<0.1% of residents lived in urban areas, while 100.0% lived in rural areas.

There were 6,153 households in the county, of which 27.2% had children under the age of 18 living in them. Of all households, 51.3% were married-couple households, 21.1% were households with a male householder and no spouse or partner present, and 20.7% were households with a female householder and no spouse or partner present. About 30.7% of all households were made up of individuals and 14.8% had someone living alone who was 65 years of age or older.

There were 6,913 housing units, of which 11.0% were vacant. Among occupied housing units, 79.5% were owner-occupied and 20.5% were renter-occupied. The homeowner vacancy rate was 1.9% and the rental vacancy rate was 13.4%.

=== 2000 census ===
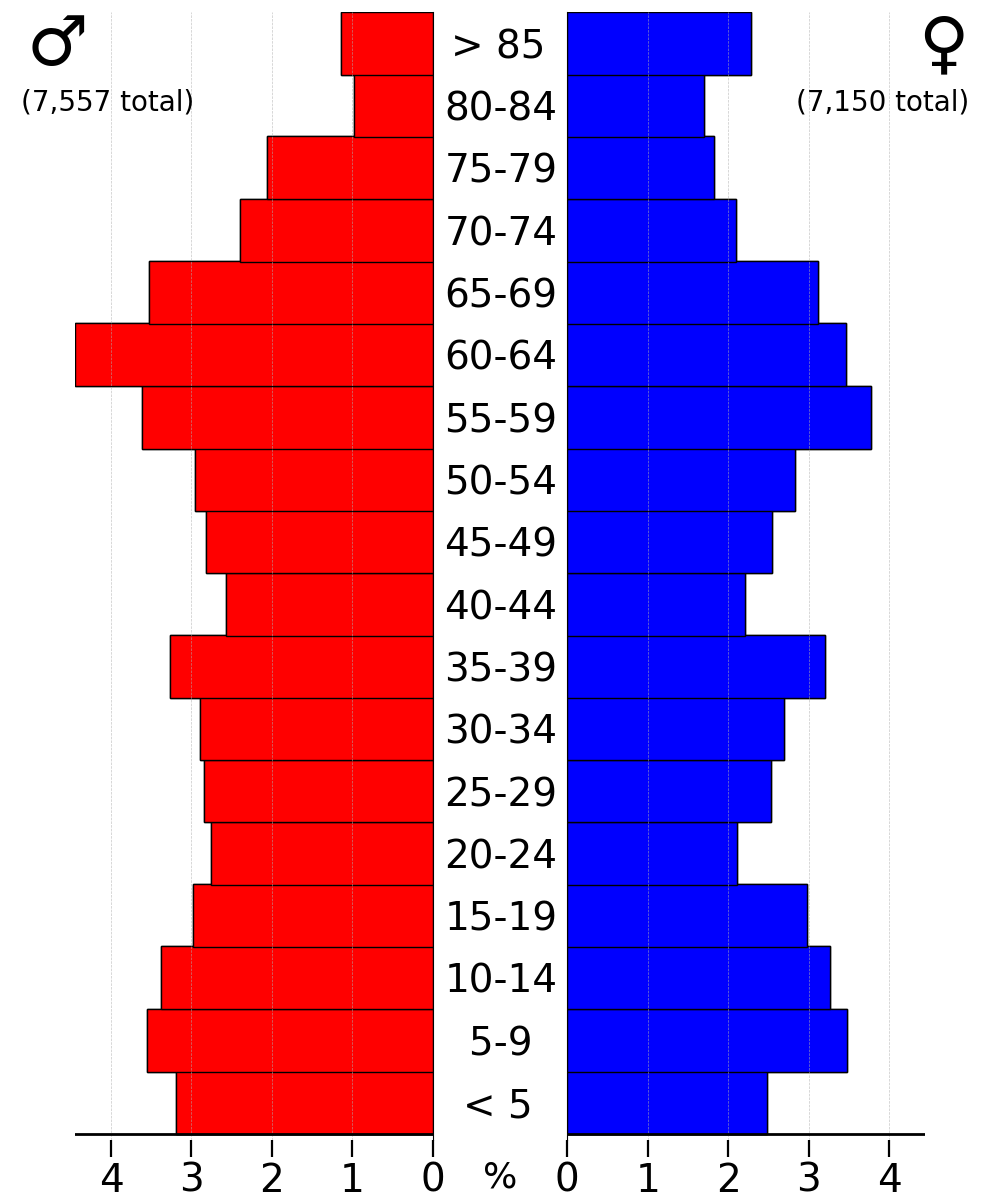
2022 US Census population pyramid for Renville County, from ACS 5-year estimates

As of the census of 2000, there were 17,154 people, 6,779 households, and 4,623 families in the county. The population density was 17.5 per square mile (6.8/km^{2}). There were 7,413 housing units at an average density of 7.54 per square mile (2.91/km^{2}). The racial makeup of the county was 95.72% White, 0.06% Black or African American, 0.51% Native American, 0.20% Asian, 0.02% Pacific Islander, 2.77% from other races, and 0.73% from two or more races. 5.11% of the population were Hispanic or Latino of any race. 50.9% were of German, 16.3% Norwegian and 5.1% Swedish ancestry.

There were 6,779 households, out of which 31.50% had children under the age of 18 living with them, 59.10% were married couples living together, 5.60% had a female householder with no husband present, and 31.80% were non-families. 28.50% of all households were made up of individuals, and 15.10% had someone living alone who was 65 years of age or older. The average household size was 2.48 and the average family size was 3.05.

The county population contained 26.50% under the age of 18, 6.60% from 18 to 24, 25.30% from 25 to 44, 21.70% from 45 to 64, and 19.80% who were 65 years of age or older. The median age was 40 years. For every 100 females there were 99.30 males. For every 100 females age 18 and over, there were 98.50 males.

The median income for a household in the county was $37,652, and the median income for a family was $45,065. Males had a median income of $30,473 versus $22,179 for females. The per capita income for the county was $17,770. About 6.30% of families and 8.80% of the population were below the poverty line, including 10.80% of those under age 18 and 8.10% of those age 65 or over.

== Communities ==
=== Cities ===
- Bird Island
- Buffalo Lake
- Danube
- Fairfax
- Franklin
- Hector
- Morton
- Olivia (county seat)
- Renville
- Sacred Heart

=== Unincorporated communities ===
- Beaver Falls
- Bechyn
- Churchill
- Lakeside

=== Ghost town ===
- Vicksburg

=== Townships ===
- Bandon Township
- Beaver Falls Township
- Birch Cooley Township
- Bird Island Township
- Boon Lake Township
- Brookfield Township
- Cairo Township
- Camp Township
- Crooks Township
- Emmet Township
- Ericson Township
- Flora Township
- Hawk Creek Township
- Hector Township
- Henryville Township
- Kingman Township
- Martinsburg Township
- Melville Township
- Norfolk Township
- Osceola Township
- Palmyra Township
- Preston Lake Township
- Sacred Heart Township
- Troy Township
- Wang Township
- Wellington Township
- Winfield Township

== Politics ==
Before 1996, Renville County was a fairly balanced precinct. Since 1996, only Republican Party candidates have received the county vote in national elections (as of 2024), although Democratic candidate Barack Obama only lost the county by 52 votes in 2008. In 2016, 2020 and 2024, Donald Trump's performances were the best by a Republican in the county since 1920.

United States presidential election results for Renville County, Minnesota
Year	Republican		Democratic		Third party(ies)	
Year	No.	%	No.	%	No.	%
1892	1,370	39.95%	984	28.70%	1,075	31.35%
1896	2,553	55.16%	1,978	42.74%	97	2.10%
1900	2,809	64.77%	1,326	30.57%	202	4.66%
1904	2,925	77.94%	639	17.03%	189	5.04%
1908	2,275	60.22%	1,364	36.10%	139	3.68%
1912	703	18.02%	1,310	33.57%	1,889	48.41%
1916	2,432	55.25%	1,660	37.71%	310	7.04%
1920	5,995	73.64%	1,283	15.76%	863	10.60%
1924	3,405	42.66%	641	8.03%	3,935	49.30%
1928	5,107	57.18%	3,731	41.77%	94	1.05%
1932	2,631	30.03%	5,967	68.11%	163	1.86%
1936	3,049	32.25%	5,344	56.53%	1,060	11.21%
1940	6,196	57.15%	4,588	42.32%	58	0.53%
1944	5,160	57.49%	3,747	41.74%	69	0.77%
1948	4,297	44.40%	5,227	54.00%	155	1.60%
1952	6,742	63.45%	3,828	36.02%	56	0.53%
1956	5,728	57.52%	4,213	42.31%	17	0.17%
1960	5,885	54.20%	4,958	45.67%	14	0.13%
1964	4,340	41.58%	6,072	58.18%	25	0.24%
1968	4,821	48.67%	4,535	45.78%	550	5.55%
1972	5,329	53.06%	4,499	44.79%	216	2.15%
1976	4,482	42.50%	5,762	54.64%	301	2.85%
1980	5,544	53.08%	4,058	38.85%	842	8.06%
1984	5,571	57.86%	3,972	41.25%	86	0.89%
1988	4,356	48.80%	4,454	49.89%	117	1.31%
1992	2,852	31.97%	3,414	38.27%	2,654	29.75%
1996	2,887	35.04%	3,956	48.02%	1,395	16.93%
2000	4,036	49.69%	3,533	43.50%	553	6.81%
2004	4,430	53.06%	3,787	45.36%	132	1.58%
2008	3,956	48.63%	3,904	47.99%	275	3.38%
2012	4,149	53.81%	3,394	44.02%	167	2.17%
2016	4,890	64.29%	2,117	27.83%	599	7.88%
2020	5,467	67.26%	2,496	30.71%	165	2.03%
2024	5,610	69.62%	2,280	28.29%	168	2.08%

== See also ==
- National Register of Historic Places listings in Renville County, Minnesota
- Renville County Historical Museum
