= Beaver Falls Township, Minnesota =

- Township
- Location within the state of Minnesota Beaver Falls Township, Minnesota (the United States)
- Coordinates: 44°35′29″N 95°2′44″W
- Country: United States
- State: Minnesota
- County: Renville

Area
  - Total: 27.1 sq mi (70.3 km^{2})
  - Land: 27.1 sq mi (70.1 km^{2})
  - Water: 0.077 sq mi (0.2 km^{2})
- Elevation: 1,020 ft (311 m)

Population (2000)
  - Total: 331
  - Density: 12/sq mi (4.7/km^{2})
- Time zone: UTC-6 (Central (CST))
  - Summer (DST): UTC-5 (CDT)
- FIPS code: 27-04546
- GNIS feature ID: 0663543

Beaver Falls Township is a township in Renville County, Minnesota, United States. The population was 331 at the 2000 census.

Beaver Falls Township was organized in 1867, and named for Beaver Creek.

== Geography ==
According to the United States Census Bureau, the township has a total area of 27.1 square miles (70 km^{2}), of which 27.1 square miles (70 km^{2}) is land and 0.1 square miles (0.26 km^{2}) (0.26%) is water.

== Demographics ==
As of the census of 2000, there were 331 people, 121 households, and 86 families residing in the township. The population density was 12.2 inhabitants per square mile (4.7/km^{2}). There were 138 housing units at an average density of 5.1 per square mile (2.0/km^{2}). The racial makeup of the township was 87.61% White, 0.30% African American, 3.63% Native American, 0.60% Asian, 6.65% from other races, and 1.21% from two or more races. Hispanic or Latino of any race were 8.76% of the population.

There were 121 households, out of which 39.7% had children under the age of 18 living with them, 58.7% were married couples living together, 9.9% had a female householder with no husband present, and 28.1% were non-families. 22.3% of all households were made up of individuals, and 6.6% had someone living alone who was 65 years of age or older. The average household size was 2.74 and the average family size was 3.22.

In the township the population was spread out, with 32.0% under the age of 18, 10.9% from 18 to 24, 27.8% from 25 to 44, 20.8% from 45 to 64, and 8.5% who were 65 years of age or older. The median age was 31 years. For every 100 females, there were 110.8 males. For every 100 females age 18 and over, there were 116.3 males.

The median income for a household in the township was $35,000, and the median income for a family was $41,250. Males had a median income of $27,222 versus $20,625 for females. The per capita income for the township was $14,430. About 7.5% of families and 10.2% of the population were below the poverty line, including 12.1% of those under age 18 and none of those age 65 or over.
