= Martinsburg Township, Renville County, Minnesota =

Martinsburg Township, Minnesota
- Township
- Location within the state of Minnesota Martinsburg Township, Minnesota (the United States)
- Coordinates: 44°40′17″N 94°41′34″W
- Country: United States
- State: Minnesota
- County: Renville

Area
  - Total: 36.4 sq mi (94.4 km^{2})
  - Land: 36.4 sq mi (94.4 km^{2})
  - Water: 0 sq mi (0.0 km^{2})
- Elevation: 1,080 ft (330 m)

Population (2000)
  - Total: 215
  - Density: 6.0/sq mi (2.3/km^{2})
- Time zone: UTC-6 (Central (CST))
  - Summer (DST): UTC-5 (CDT)
- FIPS code: 27-40832
- GNIS feature ID: 0664924

Martinsburg Township is a township in Renville County, Minnesota, United States. The population was 215 at the 2000 census.

Martinsburg Township was organized in 1878, and named for Martin Grummons, the son of a county official.

== Geography ==
According to the United States Census Bureau, the township has a total area of 36.5 square miles (94.4 km^{2}), all land.

== Demographics ==
As of the census of 2000, there were 215 people, 77 households, and 58 families residing in the township. The population density was 5.9 inhabitants per square mile (2.3/km^{2}). There were 85 housing units at an average density of 2.3 per square mile (0.89/km^{2}). The racial makeup of the township was 99.07% White, and 0.93% from two or more races.

There were 77 households, out of which 39.0% had children under the age of 18 living with them, 71.4% were married couples living together, 3.9% had a female householder with no husband present, and 23.4% were non-families. 20.8% of all households were made up of individuals, and 3.9% had someone living alone who was 65 years of age or older. The average household size was 2.79 and the average family size was 3.27.

In the township the population was spread out, with 31.2% under the age of 18, 4.2% from 18 to 24, 28.8% from 25 to 44, 26.5% from 45 to 64, and 9.3% who were 65 years of age or older. The median age was 37 years. For every 100 females, there were 119.4 males. For every 100 females age 18 and over, there were 127.7 males.

The median income for a household in the township was $43,750, and the median income for a family was $46,250. Males had a median income of $32,917 versus $19,375 for females. The per capita income for the township was $17,619. About 12.5% of families and 11.2% of the population were below the poverty line, including 13.8% of those under the age of eighteen and 8.0% of those 65 or over.
