= Preston Lake Township, Renville County, Minnesota =

Preston Lake Township, Minnesota
- Township
- Location within the state of Minnesota Preston Lake Township, Minnesota (the United States)
- Coordinates: 44°45′20″N 94°34′9″W
- Country: United States
- State: Minnesota
- County: Renville

Area
  - Total: 38.9 sq mi (100.7 km^{2})
  - Land: 37.4 sq mi (96.8 km^{2})
  - Water: 1.5 sq mi (3.9 km^{2})
- Elevation: 1,070 ft (326 m)

Population (2000)
  - Total: 293
  - Density: 7.8/sq mi (3/km^{2})
- Time zone: UTC-6 (Central (CST))
  - Summer (DST): UTC-5 (CDT)
- FIPS code: 27-52486
- GNIS feature ID: 0665356

Preston Lake Township is a township in Renville County, Minnesota, United States. The population was 293 at the 2000 census.

Preston Lake Township was organized in 1869.

== Geography ==
According to the United States Census Bureau, the township has a total area of 38.9 square miles (100.8 km^{2}), of which 37.4 square miles (96.8 km^{2}) is land and 1.5 square miles (3.9 km^{2}) (3.91%) is water.

== Demographics ==
As of the census of 2000, there were 293 people, 115 households, and 87 families residing in the township. The population density was 7.8 people per square mile (3.0/km^{2}). There were 131 housing units at an average density of 3.5/sq mi (1.4/km^{2}). The racial makeup of the township was 97.61% White, 2.05% from other races, and 0.34% from two or more races. Hispanic or Latino of any race were 2.73% of the population.

There were 115 households, out of which 29.6% had children under the age of 18 living with them, 73.0% were married couples living together, 1.7% had a female householder with no husband present, and 23.5% were non-families. 21.7% of all households were made up of individuals, and 8.7% had someone living alone who was 65 years of age or older. The average household size was 2.55 and the average family size was 2.98.

In the township the population was spread out, with 23.9% under the age of 18, 5.5% from 18 to 24, 27.3% from 25 to 44, 23.5% from 45 to 64, and 19.8% who were 65 years of age or older. The median age was 40 years. For every 100 females, there were 107.8 males. For every 100 females age 18 and over, there were 112.4 males.

The median income for a household in the township was $41,944, and the median income for a family was $47,031. Males had a median income of $28,500 versus $22,292 for females. The per capita income for the township was $17,690. About 4.7% of families and 6.0% of the population were below the poverty line, including 7.4% of those under the age of eighteen and 9.0% of those 65 or over.
