= Norfolk Township, Renville County, Minnesota =

Norfolk Township, Minnesota
- Township
- Location within the state of Minnesota Norfolk Township, Minnesota (the United States)
- Coordinates: 44°39′56″N 94°56′24″W
- Country: United States
- State: Minnesota
- County: Renville

Area
  - Total: 35.7 sq mi (92.5 km^{2})
  - Land: 35.7 sq mi (92.5 km^{2})
  - Water: 0 sq mi (0.0 km^{2})
- Elevation: 1,060 ft (323 m)

Population (2000)
  - Total: 207
  - Density: 5.7/sq mi (2.2/km^{2})
- Time zone: UTC-6 (Central (CST))
  - Summer (DST): UTC-5 (CDT)
- FIPS code: 27-46600
- GNIS feature ID: 0665137

Norfolk Township is a township in Renville County, Minnesota, United States. The population was 207 at the 2000 census.

== History ==
Norfolk Township was originally called Houlton Township, and under the latter name was organized in 1869. It was renamed in 1871 to Marschner Township and renamed again in 1874 to its present name of Norfolk Township.

== Geography ==
According to the United States Census Bureau, the township has a total area of 35.7 square miles (92.5 km^{2}), all land.

== Demographics ==
As of the census of 2000, there were 207 people, 75 households, and 57 families residing in the township. The population density was 5.8 people per square mile (2.2/km^{2}). There were 79 housing units at an average density of 2.2/sq mi (0.9/km^{2}). The racial makeup of the township was 99.03% White, 0.48% African American and 0.48% Asian. Hispanic or Latino of any race were 0.48% of the population.

There were 75 households, out of which 38.7% had children under the age of 18 living with them, 64.0% were married couples living together, 6.7% had a female householder with no husband present, and 24.0% were non-families. 21.3% of all households were made up of individuals, and 10.7% had someone living alone who was 65 years of age or older. The average household size was 2.76 and the average family size was 3.25.

In the township the population was spread out, with 30.9% under the age of 18, 6.8% from 18 to 24, 29.5% from 25 to 44, 20.3% from 45 to 64, and 12.6% who were 65 years of age or older. The median age was 38 years. For every 100 females, there were 125.0 males. For every 100 females age 18 and over, there were 110.3 males.

The median income for a household in the township was $36,806, and the median income for a family was $42,000. Males had a median income of $25,385 versus $21,500 for females. The per capita income for the township was $15,337. About 3.6% of families and 8.8% of the population were below the poverty line, including 8.9% of those under the age of eighteen and none of those 65 or over.
