= Boon Lake Township, Renville County, Minnesota =

Boon Lake Township, Minnesota
- Township
- Location within the state of Minnesota Boon Lake Township, Minnesota (the United States)
- Coordinates: 44°50′18″N 94°33′16″W
- Country: United States
- State: Minnesota
- County: Renville

Area
  - Total: 39.2 sq mi (101.5 km^{2})
  - Land: 37.3 sq mi (96.5 km^{2})
  - Water: 1.9 sq mi (4.9 km^{2})
- Elevation: 1,079 ft (329 m)

Population (2000)
  - Total: 400
  - Density: 11/sq mi (4.1/km^{2})
- Time zone: UTC-6 (Central (CST))
  - Summer (DST): UTC-5 (CDT)
- FIPS code: 27-06976
- GNIS feature ID: 0663633

Boon Lake Township is a township in Renville County, Minnesota, United States. The population was 400 at the 2000 census.

== History ==
Boon Lake Township was organized in 1870, and named after Boon Lake.

== Geography ==
According to the United States Census Bureau, the township has a total area of 39.2 square miles (102 km^{2}), of which 37.3 square miles (97 km^{2}) is land and 1.9 square miles (4.9 km^{2}) (4.85%) is water.

== Demographics ==
As of the census of 2000, there were 400 people, 151 households, and 115 families residing in the township. The population density was 10.7 inhabitants per square mile (4.1/km^{2}). There were 174 housing units at an average density of 4.7 per square mile (1.8/km^{2}). The racial makeup of the township was 97.50% White, 1.50% Asian, 0.75% from other races, and 0.25% from two or more races. Hispanic or Latino of any race were 0.75% of the population.

There were 151 households, out of which 31.1% had children under the age of 18 living with them, 70.9% were married couples living together, 3.3% had a female householder with no husband present, and 23.2% were non-families. 20.5% of all households were made up of individuals, and 6.6% had someone living alone who was 65 years of age or older. The average household size was 2.65 and the average family size was 3.10.

In the township the population was spread out, with 25.0% under the age of 18, 7.8% from 18 to 24, 27.0% from 25 to 44, 24.0% from 45 to 64, and 16.3% who were 65 years of age or older. The median age was 39 years. For every 100 females, there were 119.8 males. For every 100 females age 18 and over, there were 117.4 males.

The median income for a household in the township was $44,792, and the median income for a family was $51,250. Males had a median income of $32,321 versus $24,643 for females. The per capita income for the township was $20,541. About 5.4% of families and 6.1% of the population were below the poverty line, including 7.8% of those under age 18 and 6.5% of those age 65 or over.

== Notable people ==
Notable people from Boon Lake have included Charles D. McEwen, a member of the Minnesota House of Representatives in the 1890s, and his granddaughter Sarah Ramsland, who moved to Canada and became in 1918 the first woman ever elected to serve in the Legislative Assembly of Saskatchewan.
