= Kingman Township, Renville County, Minnesota =

Kingman Township, Minnesota
- Township
- Location within the state of Minnesota Kingman Township, Minnesota (the United States)
- Coordinates: 44°50′24″N 94°56′9″W
- Country: United States
- State: Minnesota
- County: Renville

Area
  - Total: 36.4 sq mi (94.3 km^{2})
  - Land: 36.4 sq mi (94.3 km^{2})
  - Water: 0 sq mi (0.0 km^{2})
- Elevation: 1,109 ft (338 m)

Population (2000)
  - Total: 252
  - Density: 7.0/sq mi (2.7/km^{2})
- Time zone: UTC-6 (Central (CST))
  - Summer (DST): UTC-5 (CDT)
- FIPS code: 27-33290
- GNIS feature ID: 0664637

Kingman Township is a township in Renville County, Minnesota, United States. The population was 252 at the 2000 census.

Kingman Township was organized in 1878, and named for W. H. Kingman, a landowner.

== Geography ==
According to the United States Census Bureau, the township has a total area of 36.4 square miles (94 km^{2}), all land.

== Demographics ==
As of the census of 2000, there were 252 people, 82 households, and 71 families residing in the township. The population density was 6.9 inhabitants per square mile (2.7/km^{2}). There were 86 housing units at an average density of 2.4 per square mile (0.93/km^{2}). The racial makeup of the township was 99.60% White, 0.40% from other races. Hispanic or Latino of any race were 0.40% of the population.

There were 82 households, out of which 41.5% had children under the age of 18 living with them, 80.5% were married couples living together, 2.4% had a female householder with no husband present, and 12.2% were non-families. 8.5% of all households were made up of individuals, and 3.7% had someone living alone who was 65 years of age or older. The average household size was 3.07 and the average family size was 3.28.

In the township the population was spread out, with 33.7% under the age of 18, 4.0% from 18 to 24, 26.2% from 25 to 44, 26.2% from 45 to 64, and 9.9% who were 65 years of age or older. The median age was 36 years. For every 100 females, there were 103.2 males. For every 100 females age 18 and over, there were 108.8 males.

The median income for a household in the township was $46,750, and the median income for a family was $46,250. Males had a median income of $24,609 versus $22,500 for females. The per capita income for the township was $19,667. About 2.7% of families and 2.9% of the population were below the poverty line, including none of those under the age of eighteen or sixty five or over.
