= Cairo Township, Renville County, Minnesota =

Cairo Township, Minnesota
- Township
- Location within the state of Minnesota Cairo Township, Minnesota (the United States)
- Coordinates: 44°30′N 94°41′W
- Country: United States
- State: Minnesota
- County: Renville

Area
  - Total: 34.2 sq mi (88.5 km^{2})
  - Land: 33.9 sq mi (87.9 km^{2})
  - Water: 0.23 sq mi (0.6 km^{2})
- Elevation: 1,027 ft (313 m)

Population (2000)
  - Total: 271
  - Density: 8.0/sq mi (3.1/km^{2})
- Time zone: UTC-6 (Central (CST))
  - Summer (DST): UTC-5 (CDT)
- FIPS code: 27-09208
- GNIS feature ID: 0663723

Cairo Township is a township (T112N R32W) in Renville County, Minnesota, United States. The population was 271 at the 2000 census.

== History ==
Cairo Township was organized in 1868, and named, directly or indirectly, after Cairo, in Egypt.

== Geography ==
According to the United States Census Bureau, the township has a total area of 34.2 square miles (89 km^{2}), of which 33.9 square miles (88 km^{2}) is land and 0.2 square miles (0.52 km^{2}) (0.64%) is water.On june 10 a historical marker honoring Satchel Paige was placed.

== Demographics ==
As of the census of 2000, there were 271 people, 97 households, and 76 families residing in the township. The population density was 8.0 inhabitants per square mile (3.1/km^{2}). There were 99 housing units at an average density of 2.9 per square mile (1.1/km^{2}). The racial makeup of the township was 94.83% White, 0.74% Native American, 1.85% from other races, and 2.58% from two or more races. Hispanic or Latino of any race were 2.95% of the population.

There were 97 households, out of which 36.1% had children under the age of 18 living with them, 70.1% were married couples living together, 4.1% had a female householder with no husband present, and 21.6% were non-families. 20.6% of all households were made up of individuals, and 3.1% had someone living alone who was 65 years of age or older. The average household size was 2.79 and the average family size was 3.21.

In the township the population was spread out, with 31.4% under the age of 18, 5.5% from 18 to 24, 30.6% from 25 to 44, 22.5% from 45 to 64, and 10.0% who were 65 years of age or older. The median age was 36 years. For every 100 females, there were 106.9 males. For every 100 females age 18 and over, there were 111.4 males.

The median income for a household in the township was $38,750, and the median income for a family was $41,375. Males had a median income of $28,929 versus $25,625 for females. The per capita income for the township was $17,310. About 9.3% of families and 13.3% of the population were below the poverty line, including 14.9% of those under the age of eighteen and none of those 65 or over.
