= Hector Township, Renville County, Minnesota =

Hector Township, Minnesota
- Township
- Location within the state of Minnesota Hector Township, Minnesota (the United States)
- Coordinates: 44°45′12″N 94°41′46″W
- Country: United States
- State: Minnesota
- County: Renville

Area
  - Total: 34.7 sq mi (90.0 km^{2})
  - Land: 34.7 sq mi (90.0 km^{2})
  - Water: 0 sq mi (0.0 km^{2})
- Elevation: 1,070 ft (326 m)

Population (2000)
  - Total: 248
  - Density: 7.3/sq mi (2.8/km^{2})
- Time zone: UTC-6 (Central (CST))
  - Summer (DST): UTC-5 (CDT)
- ZIP code: 55342
- Area code: 320
- FIPS code: 27-28142
- GNIS feature ID: 0664435

Hector Township is a township in Renville County, Minnesota, United States. The population was 248 at the 2000 census.

Hector Township was organized in 1874, and named after Hector, New York, the native home of a large share of the first settlers.

== Geography ==
According to the United States Census Bureau, the township has a total area of 34.7 square miles (90 km^{2}), all land.

== Demographics ==
As of the census of 2000, there were 248 people, 101 households, and 71 families residing in the township. The population density was 7.1 inhabitants per square mile (2.7/km^{2}). There were 118 housing units at an average density of 3.4 per square mile (1.3/km^{2}). The racial makeup of the township was 99.60% White and 0.40% Asian.

There were 101 households, out of which 27.7% had children under the age of 18 living with them, 64.4% were married couples living together, 3.0% had a female householder with no husband present, and 29.7% were non-families. 22.8% of all households were made up of individuals, and 9.9% had someone living alone who was 65 years of age or older. The average household size was 2.46 and the average family size was 2.92.

In the township the population was spread out, with 23.0% under the age of 18, 6.5% from 18 to 24, 24.2% from 25 to 44, 25.8% from 45 to 64, and 20.6% who were 65 years of age or older. The median age was 41 years. For every 100 females, there were 123.4 males. For every 100 females age 18 and over, there were 114.6 males.

The median income for a household in the township was $45,313, and the median income for a family was $46,563. Males had a median income of $28,929 versus $19,167 for females. The per capita income for the township was $17,645. About 2.7% of families and 2.7% of the population were below the poverty line, including none of those under the age of eighteen or sixty five or over.
