= Camp Township, Renville County, Minnesota =

Township in Renville County, Minnesota

Coordinates: 44°30′08″N 94°47′44″W

Camp Township is a township in Renville County, Minnesota, United States. The population was 207 at the time of the 2000 census. Camp Township was organized in 1867.

== Geography ==
According to the United States Census Bureau, the township has a total area of 28.5 square miles (74 km^{2}), of which 28.5 square miles (74 km^{2}) is land and 0.04 square miles (0.10 km^{2}) (0.14%) is water.

== Demographics ==
As of the census of 2000, there were 207 people, 91 households, and 54 families residing in the township. The population density was 7.3 people per square mile (2.8/km^{2}). There were 96 housing units at an average density of 3.4/sq mi (1.3/km^{2}). The racial makeup of the township was 98.07% White, 0.48% Pacific Islander, and 1.45% from two or more races.

There were 91 households, out of which 26.4% had children under the age of 18 living with them, 53.8% were married couples living together, 2.2% had a female householder with no husband present, and 39.6% were non-families. 34.1% of all households were made up of individuals, and 17.6% had someone living alone who was 65 years of age or older. The average household size was 2.27 and the average family size was 2.96.

In the township the population was spread out, with 23.7% under the age of 18, 4.3% from 18 to 24, 29.0% from 25 to 44, 24.2% from 45 to 64, and 18.8% who were 65 years of age or older. The median age was 42 years. For every 100 females, there were 113.4 males. For every 100 females age 18 and over, there were 129.0 males.

The median income for a household in the township was $32,500, and the median income for a family was $37,813. Males had a median income of $27,344 versus $26,250 for females. The per capita income for the township was $15,422. None of the families and 3.4% of the population were living below the poverty line.
