= Birch Cooley Township, Renville County, Minnesota =

Birch Cooley Township, Minnesota
- Township
- Location within the state of Minnesota Birch Cooley Township, Minnesota (the United States)
- Coordinates: 44°34′10″N 94°55′23″W
- Country: United States
- State: Minnesota
- County: Renville

Area
  - Total: 41.5 sq mi (107.4 km^{2})
  - Land: 41.5 sq mi (107.4 km^{2})
  - Water: 0 sq mi (0.0 km^{2})
- Elevation: 1,030 ft (314 m)

Population (2000)
  - Total: 257
  - Density: 6.2/sq mi (2.4/km^{2})
- Time zone: UTC-6 (Central (CST))
  - Summer (DST): UTC-5 (CDT)
- FIPS code: 27-05968
- GNIS feature ID: 0663594

Birch Cooley Township is a township in Renville County, Minnesota, United States. The population was 257 at the 2000 census.

Birch Cooley Township was organized in 1867, and named after Birch Coulee Creek.

== History ==
Birch Cooley Township was the site of some of the heaviest fighting of the 1862 Dakota War due to its location directly across the Minnesota River from the Lower Sioux Agency. The Battle of Redwood Ferry and Battle of Birch Coulee both took place within the township. The Birch Coulee Battlefield historic site is located in the township.

== Geography ==
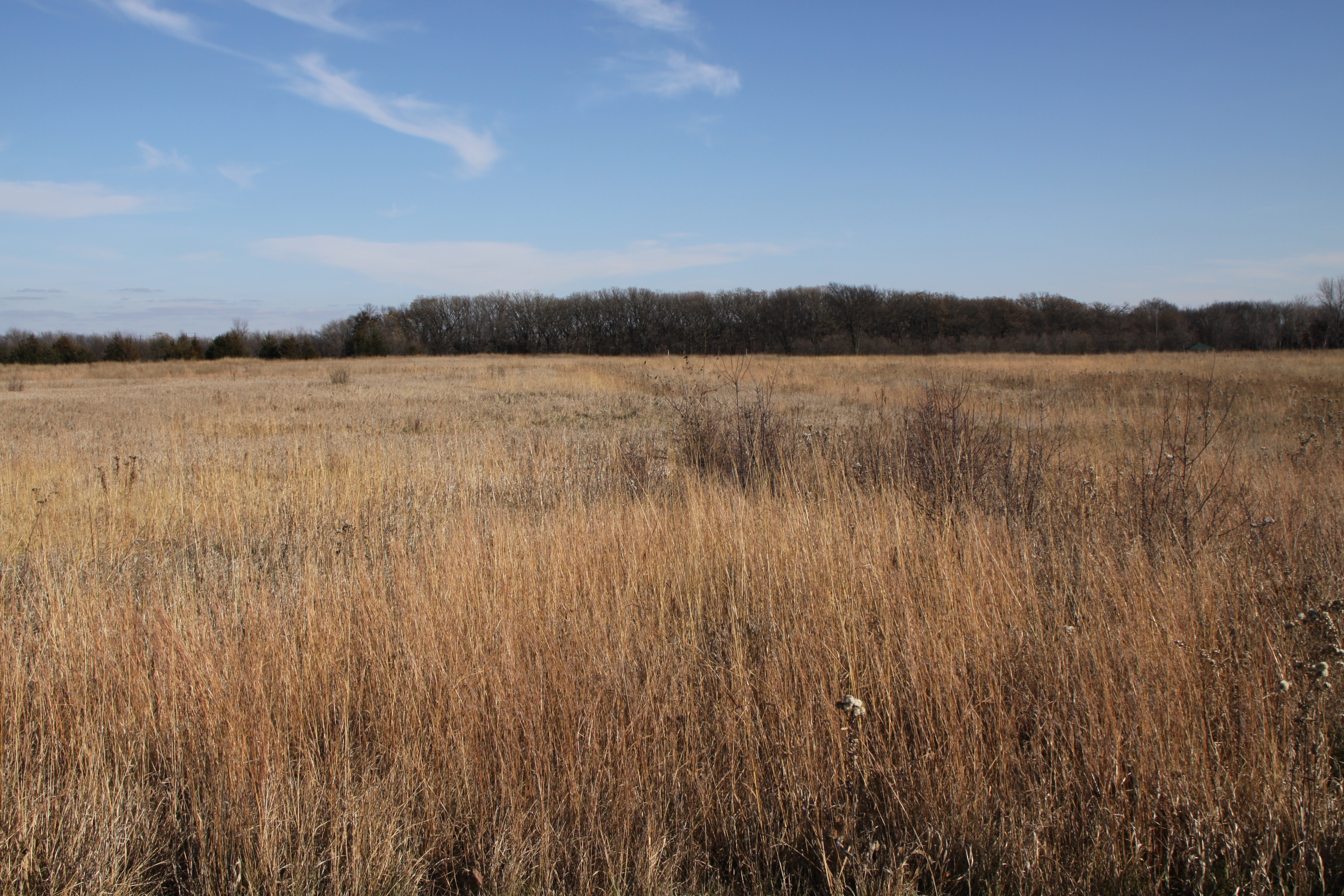
Birch Coulee Battlefield

According to the United States Census Bureau, the township has a total area of 41.5 square miles (107 km^{2}), of which 41.5 square miles (107 km^{2}) is land and 0.02% is water.

== Demographics ==
As of the census of 2000, there were 257 people, 95 households, and 68 families residing in the township. The population density was 6.2 inhabitants per square mile (2.4/km^{2}). There were 98 housing units at an average density of 2.4 per square mile (0.93/km^{2}). The racial makeup of the township was 95.33% White, 1.56% Native American, 0.39% Asian, 2.33% from other races, and 0.39% from two or more races. Hispanic or Latino of any race were 2.33% of the population.

There were 95 households, out of which 35.8% had children under the age of 18 living with them, 67.4% were married couples living together, 3.2% had a female householder with no husband present, and 28.4% were non-families. 23.2% of all households were made up of individuals, and 12.6% had someone living alone who was 65 years of age or older. The average household size was 2.71 and the average family size was 3.29.

In the township the population was spread out, with 31.9% under the age of 18, 4.7% from 18 to 24, 30.0% from 25 to 44, 19.8% from 45 to 64, and 13.6% who were 65 years of age or older. The median age was 36 years. For every 100 females, there were 104.0 males. For every 100 females age 18 and over, there were 103.5 males.

The median income for a household in the township was $46,111, and the median income for a family was $45,893. Males had a median income of $27,292 versus $21,364 for females. The per capita income for the township was $15,827. About 11.3% of families and 10.9% of the population were below the poverty line, including 10.3% of those under the age of eighteen and 21.4% of those 65 or over.
