= Wellington Township, Renville County, Minnesota =

Wellington Township, Minnesota
- Township
- Location within the state of Minnesota Wellington Township, Minnesota (the United States)
- Coordinates: 44°35′35″N 94°41′53″W
- Country: United States
- State: Minnesota
- County: Renville

Area
  - Total: 36.3 sq mi (94.1 km^{2})
  - Land: 36.1 sq mi (93.5 km^{2})
  - Water: 0.23 sq mi (0.6 km^{2})
- Elevation: 1,066 ft (325 m)

Population (2000)
  - Total: 242
  - Density: 6.7/sq mi (2.6/km^{2})
- Time zone: UTC-6 (Central (CST))
  - Summer (DST): UTC-5 (CDT)
- FIPS code: 27-69088
- GNIS feature ID: 0665949

Wellington Township is a township in Renville County, Minnesota, United States. The population was 242 at the 2000 census.

Wellington Township was organized in 1873, and named for Arthur Wellesley, 1st Duke of Wellington.

== Geography ==
According to the United States Census Bureau, the township has a total area of 36.3 square miles (94.1 km^{2}), of which 36.1 square miles (93.5 km^{2}) is land and 0.2 square mile (0.6 km^{2}) (0.61%) is water.

== Demographics ==
As of the census of 2000, there were 242 people, 85 households, and 70 families residing in the township. The population density was 6.7 people per square mile (2.6/km^{2}). There were 93 housing units at an average density of 2.6/sq mi (1.0/km^{2}). The racial makeup of the township was 98.35% White, 0.83% from other races, and 0.83% from two or more races. Hispanic or Latino of any race were 2.89% of the population.

There were 85 households, out of which 37.6% had children under the age of 18 living with them, 76.5% were married couples living together, 2.4% had a female householder with no husband present, and 16.5% were non-families. 16.5% of all households were made up of individuals, and 5.9% had someone living alone who was 65 years of age or older. The average household size was 2.85 and the average family size was 3.14.

In the township the population was spread out, with 27.3% under the age of 18, 5.8% from 18 to 24, 24.4% from 25 to 44, 26.9% from 45 to 64, and 15.7% who were 65 years of age or older. The median age was 41 years. For every 100 females, there were 100.0 males. For every 100 females age 18 and over, there were 109.5 males.

The median income for a household in the township was $38,281, and the median income for a family was $46,875. Males had a median income of $30,313 versus $26,607 for females. The per capita income for the township was $15,746. About 11.9% of families and 8.9% of the population were below the poverty line, including 7.3% of those under the age of eighteen and 19.0% of those 65 or over.
