= Sacred Heart Township, Renville County, Minnesota =

Sacred Heart Township, Minnesota
- Township
- Location within the state of Minnesota Sacred Heart Township, Minnesota (the United States)
- Coordinates: 44°44′27″N 95°17′29″W
- Country: United States
- State: Minnesota
- County: Renville

Area
  - Total: 51.5 sq mi (133.4 km^{2})
  - Land: 51.5 sq mi (133.4 km^{2})
  - Water: 0.039 sq mi (0.1 km^{2})
- Elevation: 1,060 ft (323 m)

Population (2000)
  - Total: 277
  - Density: 5.4/sq mi (2.1/km^{2})
- Time zone: UTC-6 (Central (CST))
  - Summer (DST): UTC-5 (CDT)
- ZIP code: 56285
- Area code: 320
- FIPS code: 27-56590
- GNIS feature ID: 0665499

Sacred Heart Township is a township in Renville County, Minnesota, United States. The population was 277 at the 2000 census.

== History ==
Sacred Heart Township was organized in 1869.

== Geography ==
According to the United States Census Bureau, the township has a total area of 51.5 square miles (133.4 km^{2}), of which 51.5 square miles (133.4 km^{2}) is land and 0.04 square mile (0.1 km^{2}) (0.06%) is water.

== Demographics ==
As of the census of 2000, there were 277 people, 104 households, and 76 families residing in the township. The population density was 5.4 people per square mile (2.1/km^{2}). There were 122 housing units at an average density of 2.4/sq mi (0.9/km^{2}). The racial makeup of the township was 99.28% White, 0.72% from other races. Hispanic or Latino of any race were 2.53% of the population.

There were 104 households, out of which 35.6% had children under the age of 18 living with them, 71.2% were married couples living together, 1.9% had a female householder with no husband present, and 26.0% were non-families. 22.1% of all households were made up of individuals, and 10.6% had someone living alone who was 65 years of age or older. The average household size was 2.66 and the average family size was 3.17.

In the township, the population was spread out, with 29.2% under the age of 18, 5.1% from 18 to 24, 30.3% from 25 to 44, 22.0% from 45 to 64, and 13.4% who were 65 years of age or older. The median age was 36 years. For every 100 females, there were 114.7 males. For every 100 females age 18 and over, there were 113.0 males.

The median income for a household in the township was $44,375, and the median income for a family was $49,375. Males had a median income of $30,250 versus $18,750 for females. The per capita income for the township was $16,963. About 9.2% of families and 12.1% of the population were below the poverty line, including 14.0% of those under the age of eighteen and 6.4% of those sixty-five or over.
