= Henryville Township, Renville County, Minnesota =

Henryville Township, Minnesota
- Township
- Location within the state of Minnesota Henryville Township, Minnesota (the United States)
- Coordinates: 44°40′11″N 95°2′43″W
- Country: United States
- State: Minnesota
- County: Renville

Area
  - Total: 36.3 sq mi (93.9 km^{2})
  - Land: 36.3 sq mi (93.9 km^{2})
  - Water: 0 sq mi (0.0 km^{2})
- Elevation: 1,056 ft (322 m)

Population (2000)
  - Total: 236
  - Density: 6.5/sq mi (2.5/km^{2})
- Time zone: UTC-6 (Central (CST))
  - Summer (DST): UTC-5 (CDT)
- FIPS code: 27-28610
- GNIS feature ID: 0664457

Henryville Township is a township in Renville County, Minnesota, United States. The population was 236 at the 2000 census.

== History ==
Henryville Township was organized in 1871, and named for Peter Henry, an early settler.

== Geography ==
According to the United States Census Bureau, the township has a total area of 36.3 square miles (94 km^{2}), all land.

== Demographics ==
As of the census of 2000, there were 236 people, 86 households, and 62 families residing in the township. The population density was 6.5 inhabitants per square mile (2.5/km^{2}). There were 96 housing units at an average density of 2.6 per square mile (1.0/km^{2}). The racial makeup of the township was 99.58% White, and 0.42% from two or more races. Hispanic or Latino of any race were 0.42% of the population.

There were 86 households, out of which 37.2% had children under the age of 18 living with them, 62.8% were married couples living together, 2.3% had a female householder with no husband present, and 27.9% were non-families. 24.4% of all households were made up of individuals, and 7.0% had someone living alone who was 65 years of age or older. The average household size was 2.74 and the average family size was 3.35.

In the township the population was spread out, with 31.8% under the age of 18, 5.1% from 18 to 24, 27.5% from 25 to 44, 19.5% from 45 to 64, and 16.1% who were 65 years of age or older. The median age was 35 years. For every 100 females, there were 118.5 males. For every 100 females age 18 and over, there were 130.0 males.

The median income for a household in the township was $43,333, and the median income for a family was $47,000. Males had a median income of $28,750 versus $21,607 for females. The per capita income for the township was $21,623. About 5.2% of families and 2.4% of the population were below the poverty line, including none of those under the age of eighteen or sixty five or over.
