= List of county roads in McLeod County, Minnesota =

- Standard county road markers

Highway names
- Interstates: Interstate X (I-X)
- US Highways: U.S. Highway X (US X)
- State: Trunk Highway X (MN X or TH X)
- County State-Aid Highways: County State-Aid Highway X (CSAH X)
- County Roads: County Road X (CR X)

System links
- County roads of Minnesota; McLeod County

The following is a list of county-maintained roads in McLeod County, Minnesota, United States. Some of the routes included in this list are also county-state-aid-highways (CSAH.)

== Route list ==
Number	Length (mi)	Length (km)	Southern or western terminus	Northern or eastern terminus	Local names	Formed	Removed	Notes
CSAH 1	—	—	Sibley County line	Wright County line	Dairy Avenue; 180th Street; Babcock Avenue; 6th Street; Babcock Avenue	—	—	
CSAH 2	—	—	Sibley County line	Wright County line	Hennepin Avenue; 13th Street; Ford Avenue; Gehlen Drive; Grove Avenue; MN 7	—	—	
CSAH 3	—	—	Minnesota 15 in Sumter Township	Armstrong Avenue in Glencoe	110th Street; 11th Street	—	—	Western Segment
CSAH 3	—	—	Minnesota 22 in Glencoe Township	Carver County line	120th Street; County 9; 122nd Street	—	—	Eastern Segment
CSAH 4	—	—	110th Street (County 3) in Sumter Township	County 7 in Hutchinson Township	Melody Avenue; 125th Street; Major Avenue; MN 7; Major Avenue	—	—	
CSAH 5	—	—	Major Avenue (County 4) in Hutchinson Township	Babcock Avenue (County 1) in Winsted	230th Street; Jet Avenue; 240th Street; Garden Avenue; 235th Street; Falcon Avenue; 230th Street	—	—	
CSAH 6	—	—	6th Street (County 1) in Winsted	Carver County line	Linden Avenue; 245th Street	—	—	
CSAH 7	—	—	Sibley County line	South Grade Road in Hutchinson	School Road	—	—	Southern Segment
CSAH 7	—	—	Minnesota 7 in Hutchinson	Meeker County line	Bluff Street; 200th Street	—	—	Northern Segment
CSAH 8	—	—	Renville County line	Vale Avenue (County 115) in Lynn Township	York Road	—	—	
CSAH 9	—	—	US 212 in Plato	6th Street (County 1) in Winsted	McLeod Avenue; Kingsley Street; Baker Avenue	—	—	
CSAH 10	—	—	County 2 in Glencoe Township	Carver County line	80th Street	—	—	
CSAH 11	—	—	Minnesota 22 in Hassan Valley Township	County 2 in Rich Valley Township	155th Street	—	—	
CSAH 12	—	—	Bluff Street (County 7) in Hutchinson Township	Meeker County line	North High Drive; Tagus Avenue	—	—	
CSAH 13	—	—	Sibley County line	US 212 in Sumter Township	Oday Avenue; 75th Street; Orange Avenue	—	—	
CSAH 14	—	—	Meeker County line	Vale Avenue (County 115) in Lynn Township	190th Street	—	—	
CSAH 15	—	—	100th Street (County 33) in Glencoe Township	US 212 in Glencoe	Morningside Drive	—	—	Southern Segment
CSAH 15	—	—	110th Street in Glencoe Township	Minnesota 7 in Winsted Township	Falcon Avenue	—	—	Northern Segment
CSAH 16	—	—	Grove Avenue (County 2) in Silver Lake	Wright County line	Main Street; Silver Avenue; 200th Street; Jet Avenue	—	—	
CSAH 17	—	—	County 7 in Round Grove Township	Sibley County line	30th Street	—	—	
CSAH 18	—	—	Renville County line	Minnesota 15 in Lynn Township	150th Street	—	—	
CSAH 19	—	—	Tagus Avenue (County 12) in Acoma Township	Meeker County line	Vista Road	—	—	
CSAH 20	—	—	Minnesota 22 in Acoma Township	Vista Road (County 19) in Acoma Township	230th Street	—	—	
CSAH 22	—	—	County 2 in Rich Valley Township	Dairy Avenue (County 1) in Bergen Township	180th Street	—	—	
CSAH 23	—	—	Babcock Avenue (County 1) in Lester Prairie	Carver County line	2nd Avenue; Pine Street; Central Avenue; County 9; 185th Street	—	—	
CSAH 24	—	—	155th Street (County 11) in Rich Valley Township	Gehlen Drive (County 2) in Hale Township	160th Street; Jade Avenue; 180th Street; Iris Road	—	—	
CSAH 25	—	—	US 212 in Sumter Township	Minnesota 7 in Hutchinson	Plum Avenue; 100th Street; Page Avenue; Jefferson Road; Airport Road; Adams Street	—	—	
CSAH 26	—	—	County 7 in Collins Township	Plum Avenue (County 25) in Sumter Township	100th Street	—	—	
CSAH 30	—	—	Sibley County line	80th Street (County 10) in Helen Township	Zebra Avenue	—	—	
CSAH 31	—	—	235th Street (County 5) in Hale Township	Wright County line	Falcon Avenue	—	—	
CSAH 32	—	—	Minnesota 15 in Sumter Township	US 212 in Sumter Township	Division Street	—	—	
CSAH 33	—	—	Hennepin Avenue (County 10) in Glencoe	Dairy Avenue (County 1) in Helen Township	1st Street; 100th Street	—	—	
CR 51	—	—	210th Street in Round Grove Township	Ulm Avenue (County 57) in Round Grove Township	Zane Avenue; 30th Street; County 7; 40th Street	—	—	
CR 52	—	—	Oday Avenue (County 13) in Penn Township	US 212 in Sumter Township	50th Street; Page Avenue; 65th Street; Plum Avenue	—	—	
CR 53	—	—	Renville County line	County 7 in Collins Township	100th Street	—	—	
CR 54	—	—	30th Street (County 17) in Round Grove Township	County 7 in Lynn Township	Tagus Avenue	—	—	
CR 55	—	—	County 2 in Rich Valley Township	Falcon Avenue (County 15) in Rich Valley Township	155th Street	—	—	
CR 56	—	—	Falcon Avenue (County 31) in Winsted Township	Babcock Avenue (County 1) in Winsted Township	Common Street	—	—	
CR 57	—	—	30th Street (County 17) in Round Grove Township	US 212 in Collins Township	Ulm Avenue	—	—	
CR 58	—	—	115th Street (County 89) in Collins Township	190th Street (County 14) in Lynn Township	Yacht Avenue	—	—	
CR 60	—	—	Vista Road (County 19) in Acoma Township	Jet Avenue (County 16) in Hale Township	Belle Lake Road; Tagus Avenue; 235th Street; MN 15; 240th Street; Major Avenue; 245th Street; Kale Avenue; 240th Street	—	—	
CR 61	—	—	200th Street (County 7) in Hutchinson Township	240th Street (County 60) in Hutchinson Township	Lake Hook Road	—	—	
CR 62	—	—	Page Avenue (County 25) in Hassan Valley Township	Minnesota 22 in Glencoe Township	Pheasant Road; Nature Avenue; 125th Street	—	—	
CR 63	—	—	180th Street (County 1) in Bergen Township	190th Street (County 93) in Bergen Township	Cable Avenue	—	—	
CR 65	—	—	Minnesota 22 in Glencoe Township	110th Street (County 3) in Glencoe Township	75th Street; Lace Avenue; 100th Street; Kale Avenue	—	—	
CR 66	—	—	County 2 in Rich Valley Township	155th Street (County 11) in Rich Valley Township	Harvest Road	—	—	
CR 68	—	—	80th Street (County 10) in Glencoe Township	Carver County line	Falcon Avenue; 70th Street	—	—	
CR 69	—	—	Morningside Drive (County 15) in Glencoe	US 212 in Helen Township	9th Street	—	—	
CR 70	—	—	Minnesota 15 in Hassan Valley Township	Nature Avenue (County 62) in Hassan Valley Township	130th Street	—	—	
CR 71	—	—	125th Street (County 62) in Sumter Township	Wright County line	Lace Avenue; MN 7; Lace Avenue	—	—	
CR 72	—	—	US 212 in Helen Township	120th Street (County 3) in Helen Township	Diamond Avenue	—	—	
CR 73	—	—	Vista Road (County 19) in Acoma Township	Tagus Avenue (County 12) in Acoma Township	230th Street	—	—	
CR 74	—	—	Falcon Avenue (County 15) in Bergen Township	122nd Street (County 3) in Helen Township	140th Street; Bergen Road; 135th Street; Zero Avenue	—	—	
CR 75	—	—	US 212 in Sumter Township	110th Street (County 3) in Sumter Township	Nature Avenue	—	—	
CR 77	—	—	Dead end in Glencoe Township	Minnesota 22 in Glencoe	Lindbergh Trail	—	—	
CR 79	—	—	County 7 in Hutchinson Township	Jet Avenue (County 16) in Hale Township	200th Street; Swan Lake Road	—	—	
CR 80	—	—	Iris Road (County 24) in Rich Valley Township	County 2 in Rich Valley Township	180th Street	—	—	
CR 81	—	—	Sibley County line	US 212 in Helen Township	Babcock Avenue	—	—	
CR 83	—	—	Minnesota 22 in Glencoe	120th Street (County 3) in Glencoe Township	Hennepin Avenue	—	—	
CR 85	—	—	Kingsley Street (County 9) in Winsted	Carver County line	235th Street; 230th Street	—	—	
CR 86	—	—	County 2 in Hale Township	230th Street (County 5) in Winsted Township	217th Street; Garden Avenue; 220th Street; Flower Road	—	—	
CR 87	—	—	Tagus Avenue (County 54) in Collins Township	Minnesota 15 in Collins Township	108th Street	—	—	
CR 89	—	—	Renville County line	County 7 in Collins Township	115th Street	—	—	
CR 90	—	—	155th Street (County 11) in Rich Valley Township	Minnesota 7 in Rich Valley Township	Koala Road; Kale Avenue	—	—	
CR 92	—	—	Minnesota 7 in Silver Lake	Minnesota 7 in Hale Township	Main Street	—	—	
CR 93	—	—	Falcon Avenue (County 15) in Winsted Township	Babcock Avenue (County 1) in Winsted Township	190th Street	—	—	
CSAH 102	—	—	3rd Street South in Browntown	2nd Street North in Browntown	3rd Avenue	—	—	
CSAH 103	—	—	Minnesota 22 in Biscay	Minnesota 22 in Biscay	Ames Street; Grant Street; Dorans Street; Merrian Street	—	—	
CSAH 107	—	—	US 212 in Plato	McLeod Avenue (County 9) in Plato	4th Avenue; Main Street	—	—	
CSAH 109	—	—	Elm Street in Lester Prairie	Pine Street (County 23) in Lester Prairie	Central Avenue	—	—	
CSAH 111	—	—	US 212 in Stewart	County 7 in Stewart	Prior Street; Main Street	—	—	
CSAH 115	—	—	Minnesota 7 in Acoma Township	Minnesota 22 in Hassan Valley Township	Vale Avenue; York Road; Airport Road	—	—	
CSAH 116	—	—	Baker Avenue (County 9) in Winsted	Linden Avenue (County 6) in Winsted	2nd Street; Main Avenue; 1st Street	—	—	
Former
