= Minnesota State Highway 261 =

State highway in Minnesota, United States

Trunk Highway 261
- MN 261 highlighted in red

Route information
- Maintained by MnDOT
- Length: 16.004 mi (25.756 km)
- Existed: July 1, 1949–1996

Major junctions
- South end: US 212 at Helen Township
- North end: CSAH 6 at Winsted

Location
- Country: United States
- State: Minnesota

Highway system
- Minnesota Trunk Highway System; Interstate; US; State; Legislative; Scenic
← MN 258	→ MN 262

State Highway 261 (MN 261) was a 16.004-mile-long (25.756 km) highway in McLeod County, Minnesota. It ran from Winsted to U.S. Highway 212 east of Glencoe. It was turned back to McLeod County maintenance in 1996, becoming County State-aid Highway 1.

Highway 261 was known as 6th Street in Winsted, and Babcock Avenue, 180th Street, and Dairy Avenue elsewhere in the county.

== Route description ==
Highway 261 served as a north–south route between the communities of Winsted, Winsted Township, Bergen Township, Lester Prairie, and Helen Township. The highway's southern terminus was at U.S. 212 just outside the city of Glencoe.

The entire route was located in McLeod County.

== History ==
Highway 261 was authorized on July 1, 1949. It was paved between Winsted and Lester Prairie in 1950 and between Lester Prairie and Highway 212 in 1953.

It was decommissioned in 1996, becoming County State-aid Highway 1.

== Major intersections ==
The entire highway was in McLeod County.

Location	mi	km	Destinations	Notes
Helen Township	0.000	0.000	US 212	
Winsted Township	11.499	18.506	MN 7	
Winsted	16.004	25.756	CSAH 6 (Linden Avenue West)	
1.000 mi = 1.609 km; 1.000 km = 0.621 mi
