= Glencoe Township, McLeod County, Minnesota =

Glencoe Township, Minnesota
- Township
- Location within Minnesota Location within the United States
- Coordinates: 44°45′0″N 94°11′17″W
- Country: United States
- State: Minnesota
- County: McLeod

Area
  - Total: 33.47 sq mi (86.7 km^{2})
  - Land: 33.33 sq mi (86.3 km^{2})
  - Water: 0.14 sq mi (0.36 km^{2})
- Elevation: 1,024 ft (312 m)

Population (2020)
  - Total: 514
  - Density: 15.4/sq mi (5.9/km^{2})
- Time zone: UTC-6 (Central (CST))
  - Summer (DST): UTC-5 (CDT)
- ZIP code: 55336
- Area code: 320
- FIPS code: 27-085-23966
- GNIS feature ID: 0664277
- Website: www.glencoetownship.com

Glencoe Township is a township in McLeod County, Minnesota, United States. The population was 514 at the 2020 census.

When organized, Glencoe Township took the name of its largest settlement: Glencoe, Minnesota.

== Geography ==
The township is in southern McLeod County. The city of Glencoe, a separate municipality, is bordered by the northeastern and southeastern parts of the township. The southern boundary of the township is the Sibley County line.

According to the U.S. Census Bureau, Glencoe Township has a total area of 33.5 square miles (87 km^{2}), of which 33.3 square miles (86 km^{2}) is land and 0.1 square miles (0.3 km^{2}), or 0.40%, are water. Buffalo Creek flows across the southern part of the township from west to east. The entire township is part of the Crow River watershed.

== Demographics ==
Historical population
Census	Pop.	Note	%±
1860	237		—
1870	487		105.5%
1880	680		39.6%
1890	817		20.1%
1900	837		2.4%
1910	835		−0.2%
1920	820		−1.8%
1930	859		4.8%
1940	826		−3.8%
1950	741		−10.3%
1960	857		15.7%
1970	662		−22.8%
1980	661		−0.2%
1990	617		−6.7%
2000	565		−8.4%
2010	495		−12.4%
2020	514		3.8%
U.S. Decennial Census

As of the census of 2000, there were 565 people, 205 households, and 169 families residing in the township. The population density was 16.7 inhabitants per square mile (6.4/km^{2}). There were 213 housing units at an average density of 6.3 per square mile (2.4/km^{2}). The racial makeup of the township was 98.05% White, 0.18% African American, 0.18% Native American, 0.18% Asian, 0.88% from other races, and 0.53% from two or more races. Hispanic or Latino of any race were 1.06% of the population.

There were 205 households, out of which 33.2% had children under the age of 18 living with them, 77.6% were married couples living together, 2.4% had a female householder with no husband present, and 17.1% were non-families. 14.1% of all households were made up of individuals, and 6.3% had someone living alone who was 65 years of age or older. The average household size was 2.76 and the average family size was 3.03.

In the township the population was spread out, with 25.3% under the age of 18, 6.0% from 18 to 24, 28.3% from 25 to 44, 27.3% from 45 to 64, and 13.1% who were 65 years of age or older. The median age was 40 years. For every 100 females, there were 106.2 males. For every 100 females age 18 and over, there were 107.9 males.

The median income for a household in the township was $55,089, and the median income for a family was $56,042. Males had a median income of $36,250 versus $26,500 for females. The per capita income for the township was $21,445. About 3.5% of families and 4.7% of the population were below the poverty line, including 1.4% of those under age 18 and 16.9% of those age 65 or over.
