= Koniska, Minnesota =

- Unincorporated community
- Location within Minnesota Location within the United States
- Coordinates: 44°50′42″N 94°13′01″W
- Country: United States
- State: Minnesota
- County: McLeod
- Township: Rich Valley
- Elevation: 1,043 ft (318 m)
- Time zone: UTC-6 (Central (CST))
  - Summer (DST): UTC-5 (CDT)
- Area code: 320
- GNIS feature ID: 1817777

Koniska is an unincorporated community in McLeod County, in the U.S. state of Minnesota.

== History ==
Koniska was platted in 1856. A post office was established at Koniska in 1860, and remained in operation until it was discontinued in 1882.
