= Hassan Valley Township, McLeod County, Minnesota =

Hassan Valley Township, Minnesota
- Township
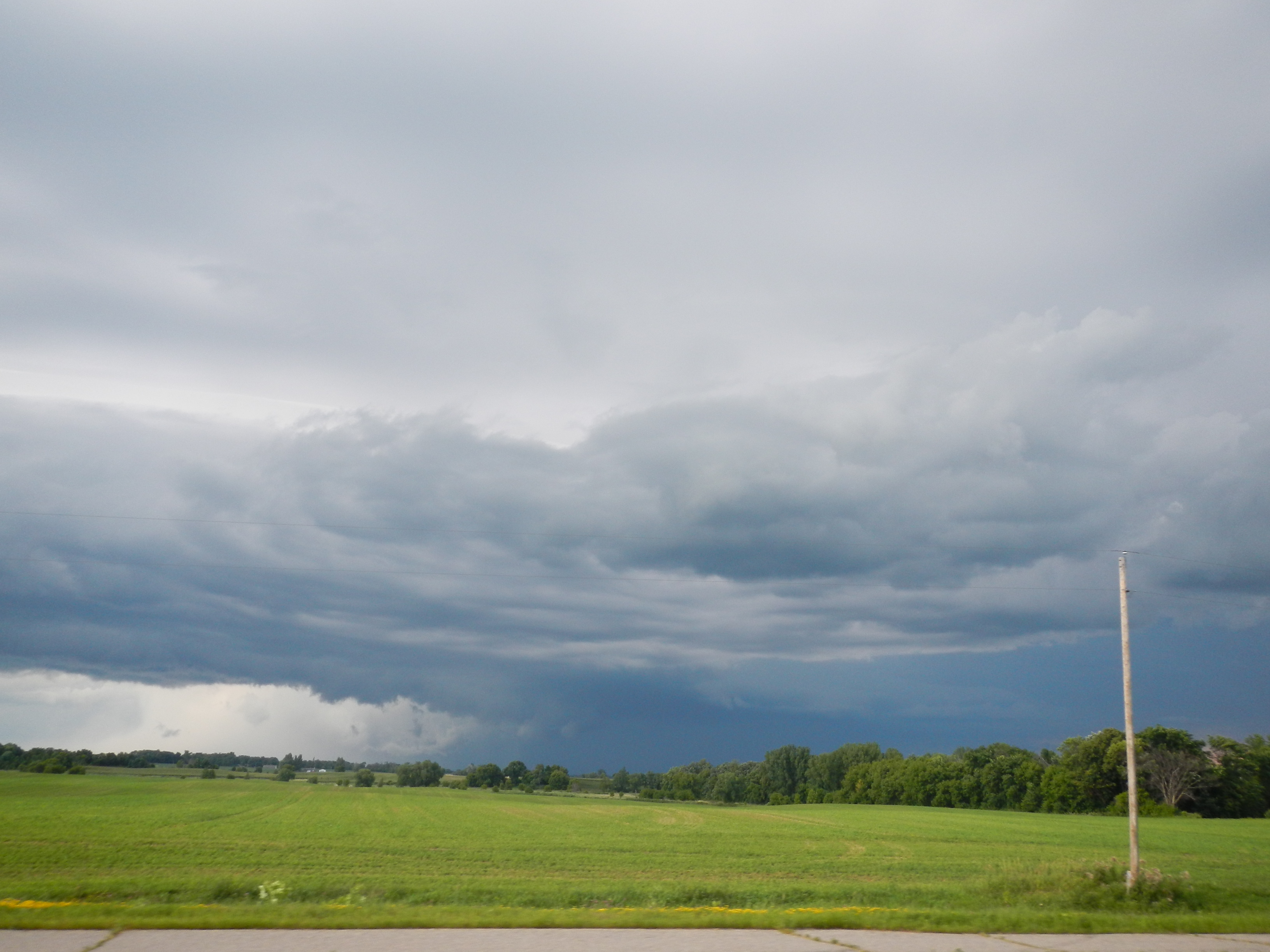
- Rural area in Hassan Valley Township

- Location within Minnesota Location within the United States
- Coordinates: 44°50′42″N 94°18′0″W
- Country: United States
- State: Minnesota
- County: McLeod

Area
  - Total: 34.2 sq mi (88.6 km^{2})
  - Land: 34.2 sq mi (88.5 km^{2})
  - Water: 0.039 sq mi (0.1 km^{2})
- Elevation: 1,056 ft (322 m)

Population (2020)
  - Total: 643
  - Density: 19.2/sq mi (7.4/km^{2})
- Time zone: UTC-6 (Central (CST))
  - Summer (DST): UTC-5 (CDT)
- ZIP Codes: 55350 (Hutchinson); 55336 (Glencoe)
- FIPS code: 27-085-27494
- GNIS feature ID: 0664410

Hassan Valley Township is a township in McLeod County, Minnesota, United States. The population was 643 at the 2020 census.

== History ==
Hassan Valley was named for the nearby valley of the South Fork Crow River (formerly called the Hassan River).

== Geography ==
The township is in central McLeod County and is bordered to the northwest by the city of Hutchinson, the largest city in the county. The much smaller city of Biscay is surrounded by the southeastern part of the township, and Glencoe, the county seat, is 9 miles (14 km) to the southeast.

According to the U.S. Census Bureau, the township has a total area of 33.5 square miles (87 km^{2}), of which 33.4 square miles (87 km^{2}) are land and 0.07 square miles (0.18 km^{2}), or 0.20%, are water. The South Fork of the Crow River, a tributary of the Mississippi River, flows from northwest to southeast across the center of the township.

== Demographics ==
Historical population
Census	Pop.	Note	%±
1910	805		—
1920	925		14.9%
1930	916		−1.0%
1940	845		−7.8%
1950	749		−11.4%
1960	721		−3.7%
1970	854		18.4%
1980	926		8.4%
1990	786		−15.1%
2000	832		5.9%
2010	693		−16.7%
2020	643		−7.2%
U.S. Decennial Census

As of the census of 2000, there were 832 people, 286 households, and 237 families residing in the township. The population density was 24.3 inhabitants per square mile (9.4/km^{2}). There were 298 housing units at an average density of 8.7 per square mile (3.4/km^{2}). The racial makeup of the township was 97.72% White, 0.12% African American, 1.08% Asian, 0.60% from other races, and 0.48% from two or more races. Hispanic or Latino of any race were 0.96% of the population.

There were 286 households, out of which 35.7% had children under the age of 18 living with them, 76.9% were married couples living together, 2.8% had a female householder with no husband present, and 17.1% were non-families. 12.2% of all households were made up of individuals, and 4.9% had someone living alone who was 65 years of age or older. The average household size was 2.83 and the average family size was 3.11.

In the township the population was spread out, with 26.4% under the age of 18, 6.0% from 18 to 24, 28.8% from 25 to 44, 24.6% from 45 to 64, and 14.1% who were 65 years of age or older. The median age was 39 years. For every 100 females, there were 104.4 males. For every 100 females age 18 and over, there were 106.8 males.

The median income for a household in the township was $56,691, and the median income for a family was $59,583. Males had a median income of $36,912 versus $28,929 for females. The per capita income for the township was $19,958. About 5.5% of families and 9.4% of the population were below the poverty line, including 8.2% of those under age 18 and 26.3% of those age 65 or over.
