= Kingston, Minnesota =

City in Minnesota, United States

- City
- Location in Meeker County and the state of Minnesota
- Coordinates: 45°11′45″N 94°18′39″W
- Country: United States
- State: Minnesota
- County: Meeker

Government
  - Type: City Council

Area
  - Total: 0.56 sq mi (1.44 km^{2})
  - Land: 0.55 sq mi (1.43 km^{2})
  - Water: 0 sq mi (0.00 km^{2})
- Elevation: 1,017 ft (310 m)

Population (2020)
  - Total: 184
  - Density: 332.3/sq mi (128.29/km^{2})
- Time zone: UTC-6 (Central (CST))
  - Summer (DST): UTC-5 (CDT)
- ZIP code: 55325
- Area code: 320
- FIPS code: 27-33344
- GNIS feature ID: 2395538

Kingston is a city in Meeker County, Minnesota, United States, located along the North Fork of the Crow River. The population was 184 at the 2020 census.

== History ==
Kingston was platted in 1857. A post office was established at Kingston in 1857 and remained in operation until 1907. On March 12, 2013, a special election was held regarding the dissolution of Kingston. With 23 votes in favor of dissolution and 36 votes against dissolution, the petition for dissolution was rendered not effective.

== Geography ==
Kingston is in northeastern Meeker County. Minnesota State Highway 15 runs along the western border of the community, leading north 8 miles (13 km) to Kimball and south the same distance to Dassel. Litchfield, the Meeker county seat, is 14 miles (23 km) to the southwest.

According to the U.S. Census Bureau, Kingston has a total area of 0.56 square miles (1.45 km^{2}), of which 0.001 square miles (0.00 km^{2}), or 0.18%, are water. The North Fork of the Crow River passes through the city just south of its main crossroads, flowing east to join the South Fork at Rockford and continuing as the Crow River to the Mississippi at Dayton.

== Demographics ==
Historical population
Census	Pop.	Note	%±
1870	56		—
1970	115		—
1980	141		22.6%
1990	131		−7.1%
2000	120		−8.4%
2010	161		34.2%
2020	184		14.3%
U.S. Decennial Census

=== 2010 census ===
As of the census of 2010, there were 161 people, 61 households, and 42 families residing in the city. The population density was 287.5 inhabitants per square mile (111.0/km^{2}). There were 70 housing units at an average density of 125.0 per square mile (48.3/km^{2}). The racial makeup of the city was 96.9% White, 0.6% Native American, 0.6% Asian, and 1.9% from two or more races. Hispanic or Latino of any race were 1.9% of the population.

There were 61 households, of which 36.1% had children under the age of 18 living with them, 60.7% were married couples living together, 6.6% had a female householder with no husband present, 1.6% had a male householder with no wife present, and 31.1% were non-families. 21.3% of all households were made up of individuals, and 4.9% had someone living alone who was 65 years of age or older. The average household size was 2.64 and the average family size was 3.10.

The median age in the city was 30.4 years. 29.2% of residents were under the age of 18; 8% were between the ages of 18 and 24; 29.2% were from 25 to 44; 22.3% were from 45 to 64; and 11.2% were 65 years of age or older. The gender makeup of the city was 55.3% male and 44.7% female.

=== 2000 census ===
As of the census of 2000, there were 120 people, 48 households, and 33 families residing in the city. The population density was 244.0 inhabitants per square mile (94.2/km^{2}). There were 53 housing units at an average density of 107.8 per square mile (41.6/km^{2}). The racial makeup of the city was 100.00% White. 34.8% were of German, 28.4% Finnish, 11.3% Swedish, 9.2% Norwegian, 7.8% Irish, and 5.0% French ancestry.

There were 48 households, out of which 31.3% had children under the age of 18 living with them, 64.6% were married couples living together, 4.2% had a female householder with no husband present, and 29.2% were non-families. 25.0% of all households were made up of individuals, and 12.5% had someone living alone who was 65 years of age or older. The average household size was 2.50 and the average family size was 3.00.

In the city, the population was spread out, with 23.3% under the age of 18, 14.2% from 18 to 24, 29.2% from 25 to 44, 22.5% from 45 to 64, and 10.8% who were 65 years of age or older. The median age was 37 years. For every 100 females, there were 140.0 males. For every 100 females age 18 and over, there were 109.1 males.

The median income for a household in the city was $39,375, and the median income for a family was $45,417. Males had a median income of $30,750 versus $19,107 for females. The per capita income for the city was $13,525. There were no families and 2.5% of the population living below the poverty line, including no under eighteens and 33.3% of those over 64.
