= Camden Township, Carver County, Minnesota =

Township in Minnesota, United States

Camden
- Township
- Location within the state of Minnesota Camden (the United States)
- Coordinates: 44°51′52″N 93°57′36″W
- Country: United States
- State: Minnesota
- County: Carver

Area
  - Total: 34.6 sq mi (89.5 km^{2})
  - Land: 33.9 sq mi (87.9 km^{2})
  - Water: 0.62 sq mi (1.6 km^{2})
- Elevation: 938 ft (286 m)

Population (2020)
  - Total: 924
- Time zone: UTC-6 (Central (CST))
  - Summer (DST): UTC-5 (CDT)
- FIPS code: 27-09406
- GNIS feature ID: 0663731
- Website: https://camdentownshipmn.com/

Camden Township is a rural township in Carver County, Minnesota, United States. The population was 924 as of the 2020 census.

== History ==
Camden Township was organized in 1859, and probably named after Camden, New Jersey.

== Geography ==
According to the United States Census Bureau, the township has a total area of 34.5 square miles (89 km^{2}), of which 33.9 square miles (88 km^{2}) is land and 0.6 square miles (1.6 km^{2}) (1.79%) is water.

The southwest quarter of the city of Mayer and the entire city of New Germany are located within the township geographically but are separate entities.

Township 116 North, Range 26 West, Fifth Principal Meridian of the Public Land Survey System.

=== Lakes ===
- Baylor Lake
- Berliner Lake
- Eagle Lake
- Smith Lake

=== Adjacent townships ===
- Hollywood Township (north)
- Waconia Township (east)
- Benton Township (southeast)
- Young America Township (south)
- Helen Township, McLeod County (southwest)
- Bergen Township, McLeod County (west)

=== Cemeteries ===
The township contains two cemeteries: Crow River and Saint Mark.

=== Major highway ===
- Minnesota State Highway 25

== Demographics ==
Historical population
Census	Pop.	Note	%±
1860	100		—
1870	414		314.0%
1880	908		119.3%
1890	1,421		56.5%
1900	1,533		7.9%
1910	1,323		−13.7%
1920	1,345		1.7%
1930	1,269		−5.7%
1940	967		−23.8%
1950	921		−4.8%
1960	887		−3.7%
1970	895		0.9%
1980	898		0.3%
1990	910		1.3%
2000	955		4.9%
2010	922		−3.5%
2020	924		0.2%
U.S. Decennial Census

As of the census of 2000, there were 955 people, 316 households, and 269 families residing in the township. The population density was 28.2 inhabitants per square mile (10.9/km^{2}). There were 327 housing units at an average density of 9.6/sq mi (3.7/km^{2}). The racial makeup of the township was 98.01% White, 0.73% African American, 0.10% Native American, 0.10% Asian, and 1.05% from two or more races. Hispanic or Latino of any race were 0.42% of the population.

There were 316 households, out of which 43.0% had children under the age of 18 living with them, 78.2% were married couples living together, 3.5% had a female householder with no husband present, and 14.6% were non-families. 12.7% of all households were made up of individuals, and 6.0% had someone living alone who was 65 years of age or older. The average household size was 3.02 and the average family size was 3.32.

In the township the population was spread out, with 29.3% under the age of 18, 7.2% from 18 to 24, 28.3% from 25 to 44, 24.8% from 45 to 64, and 10.4% who were 65 years of age or older. The median age was 37 years. For every 100 females, there were 109.0 males. For every 100 females age 18 and over, there were 108.3 males.

The median income for a household in the township was $60,563, and the median income for a family was $62,188. Males had a median income of $35,714 versus $31,058 for females. The per capita income for the township was $23,502. About 2.2% of families and 2.9% of the population were below the poverty line, including 3.8% of those under age 18 and 2.9% of those age 65 or over.

== Politics ==
Presidential election results

2020 Precinct Results Spreadsheet2016 Precinct Results Spreadsheet2012 Precinct Results Spreadsheet2008 Precinct Results Spreadsheet2004 Precinct Results Spreadsheet2000 Precinct Results Spreadsheet1996 Precinct Results1992 Precinct Results1988 Precinct Results1984 Precinct Results1980 Precinct Results1976 Precinct Results1968 Precinct Results1964 Precinct Results1960 Precinct Results
Year	Republican	Democratic	Third parties
2020	74.7% 461	23.5% 145	1.8% 11
2016	76.7% 419	18.9% 103	4.4% 24
2012	74.5% 401	23.6% 127	1.9% 10
2008	69.9% 369	25.9% 137	4.2% 22
2004	72.4% 386	26.1% 139	1.5% 8
2000	62.9% 303	26.8% 129	10.3% 50
1996	47.3% 204	30.6% 132	22.1% 95
1992	39.7% 175	28.8% 127	31.5% 139
1988	60.7% 238	39.3% 154	0.0% 0
1984	72.6% 284	27.4% 107	0.0% 0
1980	67.6% 279	23.5% 97	8.9% 37
1976	50.2% 203	45.3% 183	4.5% 18
1968	67.7% 239	24.6% 87	7.7% 27
1964	56.6% 179	45.4% 137	0.0% 0
1960	70.3% 234	29.1% 97	0.6% 2
