= Morningside Drive =

Morningside Drive may refer to:

- Morningside Drive (Manhattan), New York City, U.S.
- Morningside Drive, Morningside, Auckland, New Zealand
- Morningside Drive, Edinburgh, Scotland, location of Morningside Cemetery, Edinburgh
- Morningside Drive, CR449, a county road in Lake County, Florida
- Morningside Drive, Morningside/Lenox Park, Atlanta, Georgia, U.S.
- Morningside Drive, a county road in McLeod County, Minnesota, U.S.
- Morningside Drive, Rice Village, Houston, Texas, U.S.
