= Winsted Township, McLeod County, Minnesota =

Winsted Township, Minnesota
- Township
- Location within Minnesota Location within the United States
- Coordinates: 44°55′53″N 94°3′48″W
- Country: United States
- State: Minnesota
- County: McLeod

Area
  - Total: 34.04 sq mi (88.2 km^{2})
  - Land: 32.98 sq mi (85.4 km^{2})
  - Water: 1.06 sq mi (2.7 km^{2})
- Elevation: 1,024 ft (312 m)

Population (2020)
  - Total: 936
  - Density: 28.4/sq mi (11.0/km^{2})
- Time zone: UTC-6 (Central (CST))
  - Summer (DST): UTC-5 (CDT)
- ZIP codes: 55395 (Winsted); 55354 (Lester Prairie); 55381 (Silver Lake)
- Area code: 320
- FIPS code: 27-085-71104
- GNIS feature ID: 0666028

Winsted Township is a township in McLeod County, Minnesota, United States. The population was 936 at the 2020 census.

The township was named after Winsted, Connecticut.

== Geography ==
Winsted Township is in the northeast corner of McLeod County, bordered to the north by Wright County and to the east by Carver County. The city of Winsted, a separate municipality, is surrounded by the northeast part of the township.

According to the U.S. Census Bureau, Winsted Township has a total area of 34.0 square miles (88 km^{2}), of which 33.0 square miles (85 km^{2}) are land and 1.1 square miles (2.8 km^{2}), or 3.10%, are water. Winsted Lake and South Lake are in the northeast part of the township.

== Demographics ==
Historical population
Census	Pop.	Note	%±
1860	104		—
1870	638		513.5%
1880	1,211		89.8%
1890	1,251		3.3%
1900	1,185		−5.3%
1910	1,167		−1.5%
1920	1,159		−0.7%
1930	1,158		−0.1%
1940	1,125		−2.8%
1950	1,003		−10.8%
1960	978		−2.5%
1970	1,155		18.1%
1980	1,176		1.8%
1990	1,103		−6.2%
2000	987		−10.5%
2010	968		−1.9%
2020	936		−3.3%
U.S. Decennial Census

As of the census of 2000, there were 987 people, 330 households, and 287 families residing in the township. The population density was 29.5 inhabitants per square mile (11.4/km^{2}). There were 342 housing units at an average density of 10.2/sq mi (3.9/km^{2}). The racial makeup of the township was 98.68% White, 0.10% Asian, 0.81% from other races, and 0.41% from two or more races. Hispanic or Latino of any race were 1.52% of the population.

There were 330 households, out of which 38.5% had children under the age of 18 living with them, 77.0% were married couples living together, 4.8% had a female householder with no husband present, and 13.0% were non-families. 9.7% of all households were made up of individuals, and 5.8% had someone living alone who was 65 years of age or older. The average household size was 2.99 and the average family size was 3.21.

In the township the population was spread out, with 29.2% under the age of 18, 7.0% from 18 to 24, 30.3% from 25 to 44, 23.0% from 45 to 64, and 10.5% who were 65 years of age or older. The median age was 36 years. For every 100 females, there were 106.1 males. For every 100 females age 18 and over, there were 109.3 males.

The median income for a household in the township was $52,778, and the median income for a family was $56,563. Males had a median income of $32,316 versus $25,000 for females. The per capita income for the township was $19,060. About 5.9% of families and 6.7% of the population were below the poverty line, including 8.7% of those under age 18 and 5.6% of those age 65 or over.
