= Bergen Township =

Bergen Township may refer to the following townships in the United States:

- Bergen Township, McLeod County, Minnesota
- Bergen Township, New Jersey (1661–1862) and formerly of New Netherland
- Bergen Township, New Jersey (1893–1902)
