= Collins Township, McLeod County, Minnesota =

Collins Township, Minnesota
- Township
- Location within Minnesota Location within the United States
- Coordinates: 44°45′46″N 94°25′20″W
- Country: United States
- State: Minnesota
- County: McLeod

Area
  - Total: 35.6 sq mi (92 km^{2})
  - Land: 34.3 sq mi (89 km^{2})
  - Water: 1.3 sq mi (3.4 km^{2})
- Elevation: 1,056 ft (322 m)

Population (2020)
  - Total: 436
  - Density: 14/sq mi (5.4/km^{2})
- Time zone: UTC-6 (Central (CST))
  - Summer (DST): UTC-5 (CDT)
- ZIP Codes: 55385 (Stewart); 55312 (Brownton); 55350 (Hutchinson)
- FIPS code: 27-085-12610
- GNIS feature ID: 0663848

Collins Township is a township in McLeod County, Minnesota, United States. The population was 436 at the 2020 census.

== Geography ==
The township is in western McLeod County and is bordered to the west by Renville County. The city of Stewart, a separate municipality, borders the township to the southwest.

According to the U.S. Census Bureau, Collins Township has a total area of 35.6 square miles (92 km^{2}), of which 34.3 square miles (89 km^{2}) are land and 1.3 square miles (3.4 km^{2}), or 4.0%, are water. Eagle Lake, Lake Marion, and Lake Whitney are in the northern part of the township. Buffalo Creek flows west to east across the southern part of the township.

== Demographics ==
Historical population
Census	Pop.	Note	%±
1870	191		—
1880	404		111.5%
1890	507		25.5%
1900	665		31.2%
1910	621		−6.6%
1920	700		12.7%
1930	663		−5.3%
1940	710		7.1%
1950	650		−8.5%
1960	589		−9.4%
1970	518		−12.1%
1980	518		0.0%
1990	495		−4.4%
2000	476		−3.8%
2010	473		−0.6%
2020	436		−7.8%
U.S. Decennial Census

As of the census of 2000, there were 476 people, 179 households, and 139 families residing in the township. The population density was 14.0 inhabitants per square mile (5.4/km^{2}). There were 209 housing units at an average density of 6.1 per square mile (2.4/km^{2}). The racial makeup of the township was 98.32% White, 1.47% African American and 0.21% Asian. Hispanic or Latino of any race were 1.47% of the population.

There were 179 households, out of which 34.6% had children under the age of 18 living with them, 69.3% were married couples living together, 3.4% had a female householder with no husband present, and 22.3% were non-families. 18.4% of all households were made up of individuals, and 7.8% had someone living alone who was 65 years of age or older. The average household size was 2.66 and the average family size was 3.06.

In the township the population was spread out, with 24.4% under the age of 18, 5.7% from 18 to 24, 28.2% from 25 to 44, 27.5% from 45 to 64, and 14.3% who were 65 years of age or older. The median age was 41 years. For every 100 females, there were 118.3 males. For every 100 females age 18 and over, there were 123.6 males.

The median income for a household in the township was $55,278, and the median income for a family was $57,054. Males had a median income of $32,159 versus $26,518 for females. The per capita income for the township was $24,267. About 0.7% of families and 1.0% of the population were below the poverty line, including none of those under age 18 and 7.0% of those age 65 or over.
