= Rich Valley Township, McLeod County, Minnesota =

Rich Valley Township, Minnesota
- Township
- Location within Minnesota Location within the United States
- Coordinates: 44°51′30″N 94°12′5″W
- Country: United States
- State: Minnesota
- County: McLeod

Area
  - Total: 36.2 sq mi (93.8 km^{2})
  - Land: 36.1 sq mi (93.5 km^{2})
  - Water: 0.12 sq mi (0.3 km^{2})
- Elevation: 1,001 ft (305 m)

Population (2020)
  - Total: 669
  - Density: 18.5/sq mi (7.1/km^{2})
- Time zone: UTC-6 (Central (CST))
  - Summer (DST): UTC-5 (CDT)
- ZIP Codes: 55336 (Glencoe); 55381 (Silver Lake); 55350 (Hutchinson); 55356 (Lester Prairie)
- FIPS code: 27-085-54322
- GNIS feature ID: 0665417
- Website: richvalleytownship.com

Rich Valley Township is a township in McLeod County, Minnesota, United States. The population was 669 at the 2020 census.

The township was named for the fertile soil of the Crow River valley.

== Geography ==
The township is in central McLeod County. Glencoe, the county seat, is 8 miles (13 km) south of the center of the township, while Hutchinson, the largest city in the county, is 9 miles (14 km) to the west-northwest.

According to the U.S. Census Bureau, Rich Valley Township has a total area of 36.2 square miles (94 km^{2}), of which 0.1 square miles (0.3 km^{2}), or 0.33%, are water. The township is drained by the South Fork of the Crow River, flowing from southwest to the east.

== Demographics ==
Historical population
Census	Pop.	Note	%±
1860	116		—
1870	527		354.3%
1880	991		88.0%
1890	1,172		18.3%
1900	1,121		−4.4%
1910	1,062		−5.3%
1920	1,104		4.0%
1930	1,023		−7.3%
1940	982		−4.0%
1950	912		−7.1%
1960	849		−6.9%
1970	875		3.1%
1980	817		−6.6%
1990	701		−14.2%
2000	727		3.7%
2010	694		−4.5%
2020	669		−3.6%
U.S. Decennial Census

As of the census of 2000, there were 727 people, 263 households, and 206 families residing in the township. The population density was 20.1 people per square mile (7.8/km^{2}). There were 273 housing units at an average density of 7.6/sq mi (2.9/km^{2}). The racial makeup of the township was 98.90% White, 0.14% Native American, 0.55% Asian, 0.28% from other races, and 0.14% from two or more races. Hispanic or Latino of any race were 0.14% of the population.

There were 263 households, out of which 36.5% had children under the age of 18 living with them, 72.2% were married couples living together, 2.3% had a female householder with no husband present, and 21.3% were non-families. 19.4% of all households were made up of individuals, and 6.1% had someone living alone who was 65 years of age or older. The average household size was 2.76 and the average family size was 3.19.

In the township the population was spread out, with 29.6% under the age of 18, 3.2% from 18 to 24, 30.1% from 25 to 44, 25.2% from 45 to 64, and 12.0% who were 65 years of age or older. The median age was 38 years. For every 100 females, there were 113.2 males. For every 100 females age 18 and over, there were 114.2 males.

The median income for a household in the township was $49,318, and the median income for a family was $55,104. Males had a median income of $35,972 versus $23,167 for females. The per capita income for the township was $21,226. About 2.4% of families and 5.1% of the population were below the poverty line, including 2.3% of those under age 18 and 11.6% of those age 65 or over.
