= Helen Township, McLeod County, Minnesota =

Helen Township, Minnesota
- Township
- Location within Minnesota Location within the United States
- Coordinates: 44°45′42″N 94°4′5″W
- Country: United States
- State: Minnesota
- County: McLeod

Area
  - Total: 35.08 sq mi (90.9 km^{2})
  - Land: 35.05 sq mi (90.8 km^{2})
  - Water: 0.03 sq mi (0.078 km^{2})
- Elevation: 997 ft (304 m)

Population (2020)
  - Total: 833
  - Density: 23.8/sq mi (9.2/km^{2})
- Time zone: UTC-6 (Central (CST))
  - Summer (DST): UTC-5 (CDT)
- ZIP Codes: 55336 (Glencoe); 55370 (Plato); 55339 (Hamburg)
- FIPS code: 27-085-28304
- GNIS feature ID: 0664442

Helen Township is a township in McLeod County, Minnesota, United States. The population was 833 at the 2020 census.

== History ==
Helen Township was named for Helen Armstrong, a pioneer settler.

== Geography ==
The township is in southeastern McLeod County, bordered to the south by Sibley County and to the east by Carver County. It is bordered on its west side by the city of Glencoe, the county seat. The city of Plato is surrounded by the eastern part of the township but is a separate municipality. U.S. Route 212 crosses the center of the township, leading west into Glencoe and east to Norwood Young America.

According to the U.S. Census Bureau, the Helen Township has a total area of 35.1 square miles (91 km^{2}), of which 0.03 square miles (0.08 km^{2}), or 0.07%, are water. Buffalo Creek, a tributary of the South Fork of the Crow River, crosses the township from west to northeast.

== Demographics ==
Historical population
| Census | Pop. | Note | %± |
|---|---|---|---|
| 1860 | 190 | | — |
| 1870 | 476 | | 150.5% |
| 1880 | 967 | | 103.2% |
| 1890 | 1,045 | | 8.1% |
| 1900 | 1,056 | | 1.1% |
| 1910 | 977 | | −7.5% |
| 1920 | 938 | | −4.0% |
| 1930 | 888 | | −5.3% |
| 1940 | 821 | | −7.5% |
| 1950 | 807 | | −1.7% |
| 1960 | 728 | | −9.8% |
| 1970 | 767 | | 5.4% |
| 1980 | 868 | | 13.2% |
| 1990 | 884 | | 1.8% |
| 2000 | 835 | | −5.5% |
| 2010 | 863 | | 3.4% |
| 2020 | 833 | | −3.5% |
U.S. Decennial Census

As of the census of 2000, there were 835 people, 295 households, and 241 families residing in the township. The population density was 23.7 inhabitants per square mile (9.2/km^{2}). There were 300 housing units at an average density of 8.5 per square mile (3.3/km^{2}). The racial makeup of the township was 98.08% White, 0.12% African American, 0.48% Native American, 0.24% Asian, 0.48% Pacific Islander, 0.24% from other races, and 0.36% from two or more races. Hispanic or Latino of any race were 0.72% of the population.

There were 295 households, out of which 39.0% had children under the age of 18 living with them, 77.6% were married couples living together, 2.0% had a female householder with no husband present, and 18.0% were non-families. 12.9% of all households were made up of individuals, and 5.4% had someone living alone who was 65 years of age or older. The average household size was 2.83 and the average family size was 3.15.

In the township the population was spread out, with 27.8% under the age of 18, 6.3% from 18 to 24, 27.3% from 25 to 44, 29.0% from 45 to 64, and 9.6% who were 65 years of age or older. The median age was 38 years. For every 100 females, there were 102.2 males. For every 100 females age 18 and over, there were 103.7 males.

The median income for a household in the township was $56,375, and the median income for a family was $58,385. Males had a median income of $35,227 versus $29,583 for females. The per capita income for the township was $21,010. About 2.0% of families and 2.5% of the population were below the poverty line, including 3.7% of those under age 18 and none of those age 65 or over.
