= Biscay, Minnesota =

City in Minnesota, United States

- City
- Location in McLeod County and the state of Minnesota
- Coordinates: 44°49′35″N 94°16′27″W
- Country: United States
- State: Minnesota
- County: McLeod
- Incorporated: 1949

Government
  - Mayor: Thomas Urban

Area
  - Total: 0.075 sq mi (0.194 km^{2})
  - Land: 0.075 sq mi (0.194 km^{2})
  - Water: 0 sq mi (0.000 km^{2})
- Elevation: 1,027 ft (313 m)

Population (2020)
  - Total: 113
  - Estimate (2022): 111
  - Density: 1,504.9/sq mi (581.06/km^{2})
- Time zone: UTC−6 (Central (CST))
  - Summer (DST): UTC−5 (CDT)
- ZIP Code: 55336
- Area code: 320
- FIPS code: 27-06112
- GNIS feature ID: 2394175

Biscay (/ˈbɪski/ BISK-ee) is a city in McLeod County, Minnesota, United States. The population was 113 at the 2020 census.

== History ==
A post office called Biscay was established in 1888, and remained in operation until 1954. The city was named after the Bay of Biscay on the Atlantic Ocean.

== Geography ==
Biscay is in central McLeod County along Minnesota State Highway 22, which leads southeast 8 miles (13 km) to Glencoe, the county seat, and northwest 7 miles (11 km) to Hutchinson, the largest city in the county.

According to the United States Census Bureau, the city has a total area of 0.075 square miles (0.19 km^{2}), all land. It is the smallest city in Minnesota by land area. The South Fork of the Crow River passes just to the east of the city, flowing southeast then northeast to eventually join the Mississippi River upstream from Anoka.

== Demographics ==
Historical population
Census	Pop.	Note	%±
1960	70		—
1970	105		50.0%
1980	114		8.6%
1990	113		−0.9%
2000	114		0.9%
2010	113		−0.9%
2020	113		0.0%
2022 (est.)	111		−1.8%
U.S. Decennial Census; 2020 Census

=== 2010 census ===
As of the 2010 census, there were 113 people, 43 households, and 33 families living in the city. The population density was 1,412.5 inhabitants per square mile (545.4/km^{2}). There were 47 housing units at an average density of 587.5 per square mile (226.8/km^{2}). The racial makeup of the city was 90.3% White, 0.9% Asian, 5.3% from other races, and 3.5% from two or more races. Hispanic or Latino of any race were 8.8% of the population.

There were 43 households, of which 23.3% had children under the age of 18 living with them, 69.8% were married couples living together, 4.7% had a female householder with no husband present, 2.3% had a male householder with no wife present, and 23.3% were non-families. 20.9% of all households were made up of individuals, and 11.6% had someone living alone who was 65 years of age or older. The average household size was 2.63 and the average family size was 3.06.

The median age in the city was 45.2 years. 28.3% of residents were under the age of 18; 6.1% were between the ages of 18 and 24; 15% were from 25 to 44; 32.7% were from 45 to 64; and 17.7% were 65 years of age or older. The gender makeup of the city was 46.0% male and 54.0% female.

=== 2000 census ===
As of the 2000 census, there were 114 people, 45 households, and 31 families living in the city. The population density was 1,642.4 inhabitants per square mile (634.1/km^{2}). There were 48 housing units at an average density of 691.5 per square mile (267.0/km^{2}). The racial makeup of the city was 93.86% White, 6.14% from other races. Hispanic or Latino of any race were 11.40% of the population.

There were 45 households, out of which 26.7% had children under the age of 18 living with them, 66.7% were married couples living together, 2.2% had a female householder with no husband present, and 28.9% were non-families. 22.2% of all households were made up of individuals, and 6.7% had someone living alone who was 65 years of age or older. The average household size was 2.53 and the average family size was 3.03.

In the city, the population was spread out, with 22.8% under the age of 18, 7.9% from 18 to 24, 28.1% from 25 to 44, 35.1% from 45 to 64, and 6.1% who were 65 years of age or older. The median age was 39 years. For every 100 females, there were 86.9 males. For every 100 females age 18 and over, there were 104.7 males.

The median income for a household in the city was $49,583, and the median income for a family was $59,583. Males had a median income of $38,750 versus $25,625 for females. The per capita income for the city was $22,988. None of the population or the families were below the poverty line.
