= Plato, Minnesota =

City in Minnesota, United States

- City
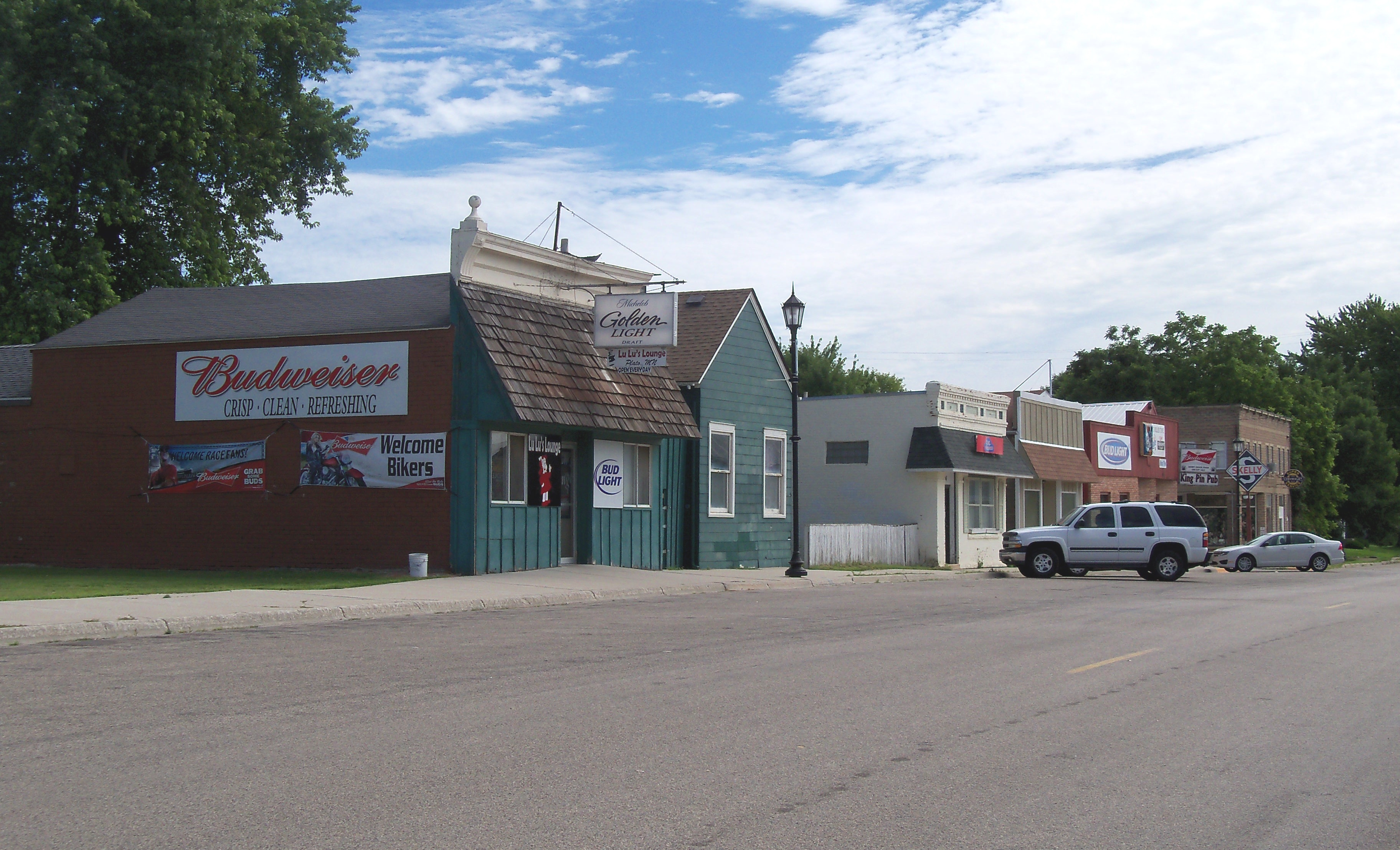
- Downtown Plato

- Location in McLeod County and the state of Minnesota
- Coordinates: 44°46′21″N 94°02′23″W
- Country: United States
- State: Minnesota
- County: McLeod

Area
  - Total: 0.35 sq mi (0.91 km^{2})
  - Land: 0.35 sq mi (0.90 km^{2})
  - Water: 0.0039 sq mi (0.01 km^{2})
- Elevation: 994 ft (303 m)

Population (2020)
  - Total: 329
  - Density: 949/sq mi (366.3/km^{2})
- Time zone: UTC-6 (Central (CST))
  - Summer (DST): UTC-5 (CDT)
- ZIP code: 55370
- Area code: 320
- FIPS code: 27-51460
- GNIS feature ID: 2396225
- Website: https://platomn.gov/

Plato is a city in southeastern McLeod County, Minnesota, United States. The population was 329 at the 2020 census.

== History ==
A post office called Plato has been in operation since 1858. The city was named for Plato, a Greek philosopher.

=== 1955 Plato auto-train collision ===
At approximately 10:13 P.M. on Thursday, November 10, 1955, a Studebaker sedan carrying six teenagers was struck by a westbound Milwaukee Road passenger train at one of the town's two railroad crossings, leaving no survivors. The county's worst vehicular and railroad accident in its history sent shockwaves across Minnesota and across the country.

The group were out celebrating a farewell party for one of its members: 18-year-old Robert A. Luedtke, who had recently enlisted in the United States Navy and was ordered to leave his home for basic training four days later.

In an investigation made and concluded by the McLeod County Police Department, the primary cause of the accident was the driver's failure of judgement via speeding.

== Geography ==
Plato lies one half mile north of U.S. Highway 212 on a county road between Glencoe, the McLeod county seat, 5 miles (8 km) to the west, and Norwood Young America 6 miles (10 km) to the east. Downtown Minneapolis is 48 miles (77 km) to the east.

According to the U.S. Census Bureau, the city has a total area of 0.35 square miles (0.91 km^{2}), of which 0.005 square miles (0.013 km^{2}), or 1.42%, are water. Buffalo Creek flows past the northwest corner of the community and the dry Kinneson Lakebed lies to the east and northeast.

== Demographics ==
Historical population
Census	Pop.	Note	%±
1880	49		—
1890	130		165.3%
1900	232		78.5%
1910	238		2.6%
1920	251		5.5%
1930	242		−3.6%
1940	283		16.9%
1950	263		−7.1%
1960	280		6.5%
1970	303		8.2%
1980	390		28.7%
1990	355		−9.0%
2000	336		−5.4%
2010	320		−4.8%
2020	329		2.8%
U.S. Decennial Census

=== 2010 census ===
At the 2010 census, there were 320 people, 139 households and 97 families residing in the city. The population density was 914.3 inhabitants per square mile (353.0/km^{2}). There were 146 housing units at an average density of 417.1 per square mile (161.0/km^{2}). The racial makeup of the city was 98.1% White, 0.3% Native American, 0.6% Asian, and 0.9% from other races. Hispanic or Latino of any race were 0.9% of the population.

There were 139 households, of which 23.0% had children under the age of 18 living with them, 61.9% were married couples living together, 4.3% had a female householder with no husband present, 3.6% had a male householder with no wife present, and 30.2% were non-families. 23.7% of all households were made up of individuals, and 8.7% had someone living alone who was 65 years of age or older. The average household size was 2.30 and the average family size was 2.72.

The median age was 44.6 years. 18.7% of residents were under the age of 18; 3.7% were between the ages of 18 and 24; 28.2% were from 25 to 44; 31.6% were from 45 to 64; and 17.8% were 65 years of age or older. The population was 50.6% male and 49.4% female.

=== 2000 census ===
At the 2000 census, there were 336 people, 144 households and 99 families residing in the city. The population density was 985.0 inhabitants per square mile (380.3/km^{2}). There were 145 housing units at an average density of 425.1 per square mile (164.1/km^{2}). The racial makeup of the city was 98.81% White, 0.60% Asian, and 0.60% from two or more races.

There were 144 households, of which 29.9% had children under the age of 18 living with them, 61.1% were married couples living together, 7.6% had a female householder with no husband present, and 31.3% were non-families. 22.9% of all households were made up of individuals, and 11.8% had someone living alone who was 65 years of age or older. The average household size was 2.33 and the average family size was 2.76.

22.6% of the population were under the age of 18, 6.3% from 18 to 24, 32.1% from 25 to 44, 24.1% from 45 to 64, and 14.9% who were 65 years of age or older. The median age was 38 years. For every 100 females, there were 97.6 males. For every 100 females age 18 and over, there were 94.0 males.

The median household income was $55,179 and the median family income was $62,917. Males had a median income of $36,250 compared with $29,018 for females. The per capita income was $24,434. None of the families and 2.8% of the population were living below the poverty line, including no under eighteens and 7.1% of those over 64.
