= Bergen Township, McLeod County, Minnesota =

Bergen Township, Minnesota
- Township
- Location within Minnesota Location within the United States
- Coordinates: 44°51′22″N 94°3′14″W
- Country: United States
- State: Minnesota
- County: McLeod

Area
  - Total: 35.14 sq mi (91.0 km^{2})
  - Land: 34.96 sq mi (90.5 km^{2})
  - Water: 0.19 sq mi (0.49 km^{2})
- Elevation: 997 ft (304 m)

Population (2020)
  - Total: 910
  - Density: 26/sq mi (10/km^{2})
- Time zone: UTC-6 (Central (CST))
  - Summer (DST): UTC-5 (CDT)
- ZIP Codes: 55354 (Lester Prairie); 55336 (Glencoe); 55370 (Plato); 55397 (Young America)
- FIPS code: 27-085-05338
- GNIS feature ID: 0663574
- Website: www.bergentownship.com

Bergen Township is a township in McLeod County, Minnesota, United States. The population was 910 at the 2020 census.

== History ==
Bergen Township was named after the city of Bergen in Norway.

== Geography ==
The township is in eastern McLeod County and is bordered to the east by Carver County. The city of Lester Prairie, a separate municipality, is in the northeast part of the township. The center of the township is 7 miles (11 km) northeast of Glencoe, the county seat.

According to the U.S. Census Bureau, Bergen Township has a total area of 35.1 square miles (91 km^{2}), of which 35.0 square miles (91 km^{2}) are land and 0.2 square miles (0.52 km^{2}), or 0.53%, are water. The township is drained by tributaries of the South Fork of the Crow River, which flows eastward across the northern part of the township.

== Demographics ==
Historical population
Census	Pop.	Note	%±
1860	133		—
1870	588		342.1%
1880	1,022		73.8%
1890	1,215		18.9%
1900	1,182		−2.7%
1910	1,053		−10.9%
1920	1,074		2.0%
1930	1,105		2.9%
1940	1,055		−4.5%
1950	872		−17.3%
1960	793		−9.1%
1970	816		2.9%
1980	840		2.9%
1990	844		0.5%
2000	881		4.4%
2010	1,006		14.2%
2020	910		−9.5%
U.S. Decennial Census

As of the census of 2000, there were 881 people, 297 households, and 237 families residing in the township. The population density was 24.9 inhabitants per square mile (9.6/km^{2}). There were 304 housing units at an average density of 8.6 per square mile (3.3/km^{2}). The racial makeup of the township was 96.37% White, 0.23% Native American, 0.34% Asian, 3.06% from other races. Hispanic or Latino of any race were 4.54% of the population.

There were 297 households, out of which 41.1% had children under the age of 18 living with them, 69.7% were married couples living together, 4.0% had a female householder with no husband present, and 19.9% were non-families. 14.1% of all households were made up of individuals, and 3.4% had someone living alone who was 65 years of age or older. The average household size was 2.97 and the average family size was 3.29.

In the township the population was spread out, with 29.7% under the age of 18, 8.6% from 18 to 24, 30.3% from 25 to 44, 21.5% from 45 to 64, and 9.9% who were 65 years of age or older. The median age was 36 years. For every 100 females, there were 122.5 males. For every 100 females age 18 and over, there were 114.2 males.

The median income for a household in the township was $52,115, and the median income for a family was $54,886. Males had a median income of $32,305 versus $26,154 for females. The per capita income for the township was $20,808. About 3.4% of families and 5.8% of the population were below the poverty line, including 8.5% of those under age 18 and 2.4% of those age 65 or over.
