= God's Country (1985 film) =

- Directed by: Louis Malle
- Release date: November 27, 1985
- Country: United States
- Language: English

God's Country is a 1985 documentary film about Glencoe, Minnesota, by French filmmaker Louis Malle. Original footage of a farming community, 60 miles west of Minneapolis, Minnesota was filmed in 1979 for a PBS documentary. But for the next six years Malle was too busy with other projects to finish this work. He returned in 1985 for a follow-up and found the community reacting to the mid eighties crisis of overproduction in farm country. Malle documented a sense of frustration and apprehension from the same participants he had befriended in better times half a decade earlier.

The film is occasionally shown on Turner Classic Movies, and is available on DVD from the Criterion Collection.

The name of the film comes from the widespread belief in American folklore that the United States of America has an exceptional status in the world as "God's country" or "the promised land" because, metaphorically, early European settlers such as the Puritans of Massachusetts Bay believed they were founding at God's behest a shining city upon a hill.
