= Lynn Township, McLeod County, Minnesota =

Lynn Township, Minnesota
- Township
- Location within Minnesota Location within the United States
- Coordinates: 44°52′2″N 94°25′46″W
- Country: United States
- State: Minnesota
- County: McLeod

Area
  - Total: 33.03 sq mi (85.5 km^{2})
  - Land: 31.77 sq mi (82.3 km^{2})
  - Water: 1.26 sq mi (3.3 km^{2})
- Elevation: 1,070 ft (326 m)

Population (2020)
  - Total: 519
  - Density: 16.3/sq mi (6.3/km^{2})
- Time zone: UTC-6 (Central (CST))
  - Summer (DST): UTC-5 (CDT)
- ZIP Codes: 55350 (Hutchinson); 55385 (Stewart)
- FIPS code: 27-085-38798
- GNIS feature ID: 0664848

Lynn Township is a township in McLeod County, Minnesota, United States. The population was 519 at the 2020 census.

== History ==
According to Warren Upham, Lynn Township may be named after Lynn, Massachusetts.

== Geography ==
The township is in western McLeod County. It is bordered to the west by Renville County and to the northeast by Hutchinson, the largest city in McLeod County.

According to the U.S. Census Bureau, the Lynn Township has a total area of 33.0 square miles (85 km^{2}), of which 31.8 square miles (82 km^{2}) are land and 1.3 square miles (3.4 km^{2}), or 3.82%, are water.

== Demographics ==
Historical population
Census	Pop.	Note	%±
1870	243		—
1880	598		146.1%
1890	728		21.7%
1900	823		13.0%
1910	753		−8.5%
1920	755		0.3%
1930	793		5.0%
1940	828		4.4%
1950	794		−4.1%
1960	708		−10.8%
1970	778		9.9%
1980	693		−10.9%
1990	734		5.9%
2000	604		−17.7%
2010	550		−8.9%
2020	519		−5.6%
U.S. Decennial Census

As of the census of 2000, there were 604 people, 216 households, and 174 families residing in the township. The population density was 19.0 inhabitants per square mile (7.3/km^{2}). There were 226 housing units at an average density of 7.1 per square mile (2.7/km^{2}). The racial makeup of the township was 99.01% White, 0.17% Asian, 0.33% from other races, and 0.50% from two or more races. Hispanic or Latino of any race were 0.50% of the population.

There were 216 households, out of which 35.2% had children under the age of 18 living with them, 70.8% were married couples living together, 3.2% had a female householder with no husband present, and 19.4% were non-families. 18.5% of all households were made up of individuals, and 10.2% had someone living alone who was 65 years of age or older. The average household size was 2.80 and the average family size was 3.19.

In the township the population was spread out, with 30.0% under the age of 18, 5.1% from 18 to 24, 25.8% from 25 to 44, 25.8% from 45 to 64, and 13.2% who were 65 years of age or older. The median age was 39 years. For every 100 females, there were 111.9 males. For every 100 females age 18 and over, there were 108.4 males.

The median income for a household in the township was $51,250, and the median income for a family was $55,972. Males had a median income of $30,521 versus $26,146 for females. The per capita income for the township was $19,699. About 4.0% of families and 5.9% of the population were below the poverty line, including 8.4% of those under age 18 and 14.5% of those age 65 or over.
