= Rockford, Minnesota =

City in Minnesota, United States

- City
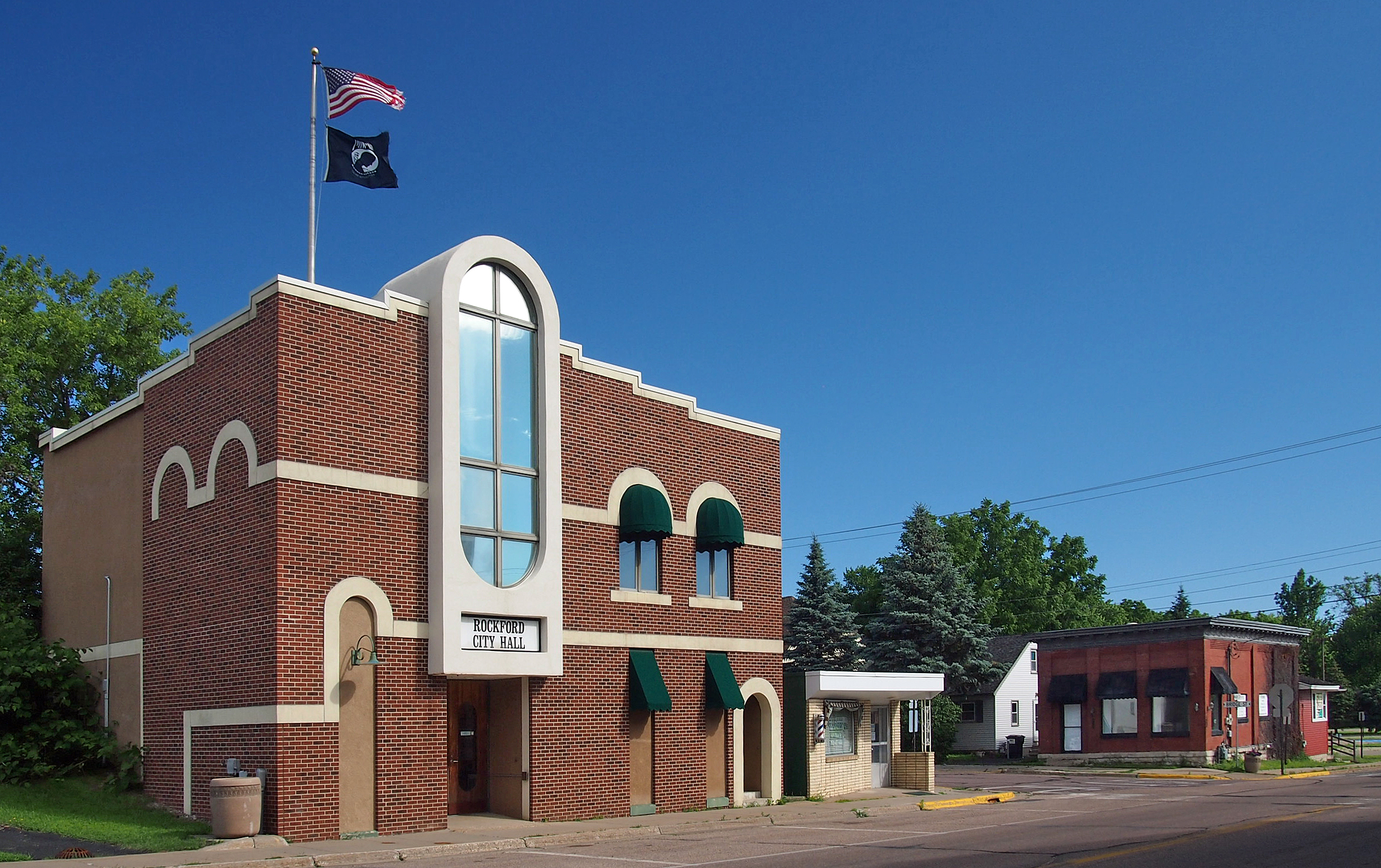
- Rockford's Main Street, with city hall on the left

- Seal

- Location of the city of Rockford within Wright and Hennepin Counties in the state of Minnesota
- Coordinates: 45°5′26″N 93°44′20″W
- Country: United States
- State: Minnesota
- Counties: Wright, Hennepin
- Incorporated: 1881

Government
  - Mayor: Renee Hafften

Area
  - Total: 2.60 sq mi (6.73 km^{2})
  - Land: 2.53 sq mi (6.54 km^{2})
  - Water: 0.069 sq mi (0.18 km^{2})
- Elevation: 915 ft (279 m)

Population (2020)
  - Total: 4,500
  - Density: 1,781.4/sq mi (687.79/km^{2})
- Time zone: UTC-6 (Central (CST))
  - Summer (DST): UTC-5 (CDT)
- ZIP code: 55373
- Area code: 763
- FIPS code: 27-55006
- GNIS feature ID: 0650206
- Website: www.cityofrockford.org

Rockford is a city in Wright and Hennepin Counties in the U.S. state of Minnesota. The population was 4,500 at the 2020 census. Rockford is mainly in Wright County, with a small part of the city extending into Hennepin County. It is part of the Minneapolis–Saint Paul metropolitan statistical area. Minnesota State Highway 55 serves as a main route in the city.

== History ==
Evidence of indigenous settlement in what is today Rockford can be found in burial mounds ranging from 500 to 1500 years old, as well as a trail that runs under the Bridge Street Bridge on the Hennepin County side. The area was a natural borderland between the Ojibwe and Dakota, with both tribes using it for hunting and wintering. The space was primarily used by the Dakota, but there was also an Objibwe village near modern-day Dayton, on the Crow River.

As colonial settlement widened in Wisconsin, the Ho-Chunk were pushed west and forced to resettle near Rockford. Though the creation of a reservation at the site was proposed, concern was raised about the proximity of an indigenous reservation so close to Minneapolis, a rapidly developing economic center at the time. After the Treaty of Traverse des Sioux in 1851, the land was opened to white settlers; after surveying was completed in 1854, plots became available for purchase to homesteaders.

In 1855, brothers-in-law George F. Ames and Joel Florida of Illinois came up the Crow River with carpenter Guildford D. George in hopes of starting a mill town. Eventually the town had multiple thriving mills: a lumber, a flour, and a saw mill. In 1859, the first US troops called to Minnesota were dispatched to Rockford in response to the so-called Wright County War, a period of rioting in the area.

A stockade was built in town during the Dakota War of 1862, and again in 1863.

Rockford was incorporated in 1881, with a railroad running through the town completed in 1886.

== Geography ==
According to the United States Census Bureau, the city has an area of 2.67 square miles (6.92 km^{2}); 2.61 square miles (6.76 km^{2}) is land and 0.06 square miles (0.16 km^{2}) is water.

The Crow River forms at Rockford by the confluence of its North and South Forks.

== Demographics ==
Historical population
Census	Pop.	Note	%±
1880	159		—
1900	340		—
1910	287		−15.6%
1920	324		12.9%
1930	287		−11.4%
1940	270		−5.9%
1950	369		36.7%
1960	533		44.4%
1970	730		37.0%
1980	2,408		229.9%
1990	2,665		10.7%
2000	3,484		30.7%
2010	4,316		23.9%
2020	4,500		4.3%
U.S. Decennial Census

=== 2020 census ===
As of the 2020 census, Rockford had a population of 4,500. The median age was 37.9 years. 24.9% of residents were under the age of 18 and 10.9% of residents were 65 years of age or older. For every 100 females there were 100.2 males, and for every 100 females age 18 and over there were 98.8 males age 18 and over.

0.0% of residents lived in urban areas, while 100.0% lived in rural areas.

There were 1,780 households in Rockford, of which 34.0% had children under the age of 18 living in them. Of all households, 49.3% were married-couple households, 18.8% were households with a male householder and no spouse or partner present, and 24.8% were households with a female householder and no spouse or partner present. About 26.2% of all households were made up of individuals and 7.9% had someone living alone who was 65 years of age or older.

There were 1,833 housing units, of which 2.9% were vacant. The homeowner vacancy rate was 1.5% and the rental vacancy rate was 2.4%.

Racial composition as of the 2020 census
Race	Number	Percent
White	3,943	87.6%
Black or African American	74	1.6%
American Indian and Alaska Native	20	0.4%
Asian	64	1.4%
Native Hawaiian and Other Pacific Islander	0	0.0%
Some other race	106	2.4%
Two or more races	293	6.5%
Hispanic or Latino (of any race)	233	5.2%

=== 2010 census ===
As of the census of 2010, there were 4,316 people, 1,622 households, and 1,147 families living in the city. The population density was 1,653.6 inhabitants per square mile (638.5/km^{2}). There were 1,693 housing units at an average density of 648.7 per square mile (250.5/km^{2}). The racial makeup of the city was 94.1% White, 1.0% African American, 0.5% Native American, 1.3% Asian, 0.5% from other races, and 2.5% from two or more races. Hispanic or Latino of any race were 1.9% of the population.

There were 1,622 households, of which 40.3% had children under the age of 18 living with them, 52.7% were married couples living together, 11.2% had a female householder with no husband present, 6.8% had a male householder with no wife present, and 29.3% were non-families. 22.1% of all households were made up of individuals, and 5.5% had someone living alone who was 65 years of age or older. The average household size was 2.66 and the average family size was 3.13.

The median age in the city was 34.7 years. 28.5% of residents were under the age of 18; 7.5% were between the ages of 18 and 24; 31.3% were from 25 to 44; 26% were from 45 to 64; and 6.6% were 65 years of age or older. The gender makeup of the city was 49.4% male and 50.6% female.

=== 2000 census ===
As of the census of 2000, there were 3,484 people, 1,296 households, and 929 families living in the city. The population density was 2,021.2 inhabitants per square mile (780.4/km^{2}). There were 1,333 housing units at an average density of 773.3 per square mile (298.6/km^{2}). The racial makeup of the city was 97.56% White, 0.40% African American, 0.52% Native American, 0.46% Asian, 0.09% Pacific Islander, 0.14% from other races, and 0.83% from two or more races. Hispanic or Latino of any race were 1.00% of the population. 38.1% were of German, 15.0% Norwegian, 8.4% Irish and 6.1% Swedish ancestry.

There were 1,296 households, out of which 44.1% had children under the age of 18 living with them, 55.2% were married couples living together, 11.7% had a female householder with no husband present, and 28.3% were non-families. 21.8% of all households were made up of individuals, and 4.2% had someone living alone who was 65 years of age or older. The average household size was 2.69 and the average family size was 3.17.

In the city, the population was spread out, with 31.9% under the age of 18, 7.7% from 18 to 24, 39.0% from 25 to 44, 16.7% from 45 to 64, and 4.8% who were 65 years of age or older. The median age was 31 years. For every 100 females, there were 99.9 males.

The median income for a household in the city was $51,349, and the median income for a family was $56,607. Males had a median income of $37,112 versus $29,395 for females. The per capita income for the city was $20,675. About 6.5% of families and 6.5% of the population were below the poverty line, including 8.8% of those under age 18 and 13.4% of those age 65 or over.

== Education ==
The main school district is Rockford Area Schools. They include an elementary school (grades preschool to 4th grade) a middle school (grades 5 through 8) and a high school (9th through 12th). The elementary focuses mainly on an arts program, while the middle and high schools put more of an emphasis on technology. The high school has, for the past four years, scored higher than the state average in mathematics. Originally, the Rockford School District was established by the Wright county commissioners on September 6, 1856, and the first school house was constructed by 1860. During the 1960s the school underwent redistricting that gave its current designation as Independent School District # 883.

== Notable people ==
- Joel McKinnon Miller, actor, born in Rockford
