= Stewart, McLeod County, Minnesota =

City in Minnesota, United States

Stewart, Minnesota
- City
- Location in McLeod County and the state of Minnesota
- Coordinates: 44°43′25″N 94°29′13″W
- Country: United States
- State: Minnesota
- County: McLeod

Area
  - Total: 0.81 sq mi (2.10 km^{2})
  - Land: 0.81 sq mi (2.09 km^{2})
  - Water: 0.0039 sq mi (0.01 km^{2})
- Elevation: 1,066 ft (325 m)

Population (2020)
  - Total: 489
  - Density: 604.7/sq mi (233.46/km^{2})
- Time zone: UTC-6 (Central (CST))
  - Summer (DST): UTC-5 (CDT)
- ZIP code: 55385
- Area code: 320
- FIPS code: 27-62788
- GNIS feature ID: 2395966
- Website: cityofstewart.com

Stewart is a city in McLeod County, Minnesota, United States. The population was 489 at the 2020 census, down from 571 in 2010.

== History ==
Stewart was platted in 1888 by Dr. D. A. Stewart, and named for him. Stewart was incorporated in 1888.

== Geography ==
Stewart is in southwestern McLeod County and is bordered to the west by Renville County. U.S. Route 212 passes through the south side of the city, leading east 17 miles (27 km) to Glencoe, the county seat, and west 11 miles (18 km) to Hector.

According to the U.S. Census Bureau, the city has a total area of 0.81 square miles (2.10 km^{2}), of which 0.003 square miles (0.008 km^{2}), or 0.37%, are water. A small portion of Round Grove Lake is within the southwest corner of the city limits.

Stewart is very flat, being located on the eastern edge of the Great Plains.

== Demographics ==
Historical population
Census	Pop.	Note	%±
1880	80		—
1890	166		107.5%
1900	407		145.2%
1910	412		1.2%
1920	540		31.1%
1930	541		0.2%
1940	636		17.6%
1950	695		9.3%
1960	676		−2.7%
1970	666		−1.5%
1980	616		−7.5%
1990	566		−8.1%
2000	564		−0.4%
2010	571		1.2%
2020	489		−14.4%
U.S. Decennial Census

=== 2010 census ===
As of the census of 2010, there were 571 people, 235 households, and 152 families living in the city. The population density was 704.9 inhabitants per square mile (272.2/km^{2}). There were 261 housing units at an average density of 322.2 per square mile (124.4/km^{2}). The racial makeup of the city was 97.4% White, 0.2% Asian, 1.8% from other races, and 0.7% from two or more races. Hispanic or Latino of any race were 4.2% of the population.

There were 235 households, of which 31.1% had children under the age of 18 living with them, 46.8% were married couples living together, 9.4% had a female householder with no husband present, 8.5% had a male householder with no wife present, and 35.3% were non-families. 28.9% of all households were made up of individuals, and 11.5% had someone living alone who was 65 years of age or older. The average household size was 2.43 and the average family size was 2.93.

The median age in the city was 39.3 years. 24% of residents were under the age of 18; 8.9% were between the ages of 18 and 24; 24.9% were from 25 to 44; 30.9% were from 45 to 64; and 11.4% were 65 years of age or older. The gender makeup of the city was 50.8% male and 49.2% female.

=== 2000 census ===
As of the census of 2000, there were 564 people, 241 households, and 146 families living in the city. The population density was 697.3 inhabitants per square mile (269.2/km^{2}). There were 254 housing units at an average density of 314.0 per square mile (121.2/km^{2}). The racial makeup of the city was 98.58% White, 0.18% Asian, and 1.24% from two or more races. Hispanic or Latino of any race were 1.77% of the population.

There were 241 households, out of which 35.3% had children under the age of 18 living with them, 48.1% were married couples living together, 9.5% had a female householder with no husband present, and 39.4% were non-families. 34.9% of all households were made up of individuals, and 16.6% had someone living alone who was 65 years of age or older. The average household size was 2.34 and the average family size was 3.05.

In the city, the population was spread out, with 27.3% under the age of 18, 8.5% from 18 to 24, 29.3% from 25 to 44, 19.3% from 45 to 64, and 15.6% who were 65 years of age or older. The median age was 35 years. For every 100 females, there were 109.7 males. For every 100 females age 18 and over, there were 99.0 males.

The median income for a household in the city was $38,542, and the median income for a family was $42,222. Males had a median income of $28,864 versus $23,036 for females. The per capita income for the city was $16,512. About 4.6% of families and 7.1% of the population were below the poverty line, including 1.3% of those under age 18 and 26.9% of those age 65 or over.
