= Winsted, Minnesota =

City in Minnesota, United States

- City
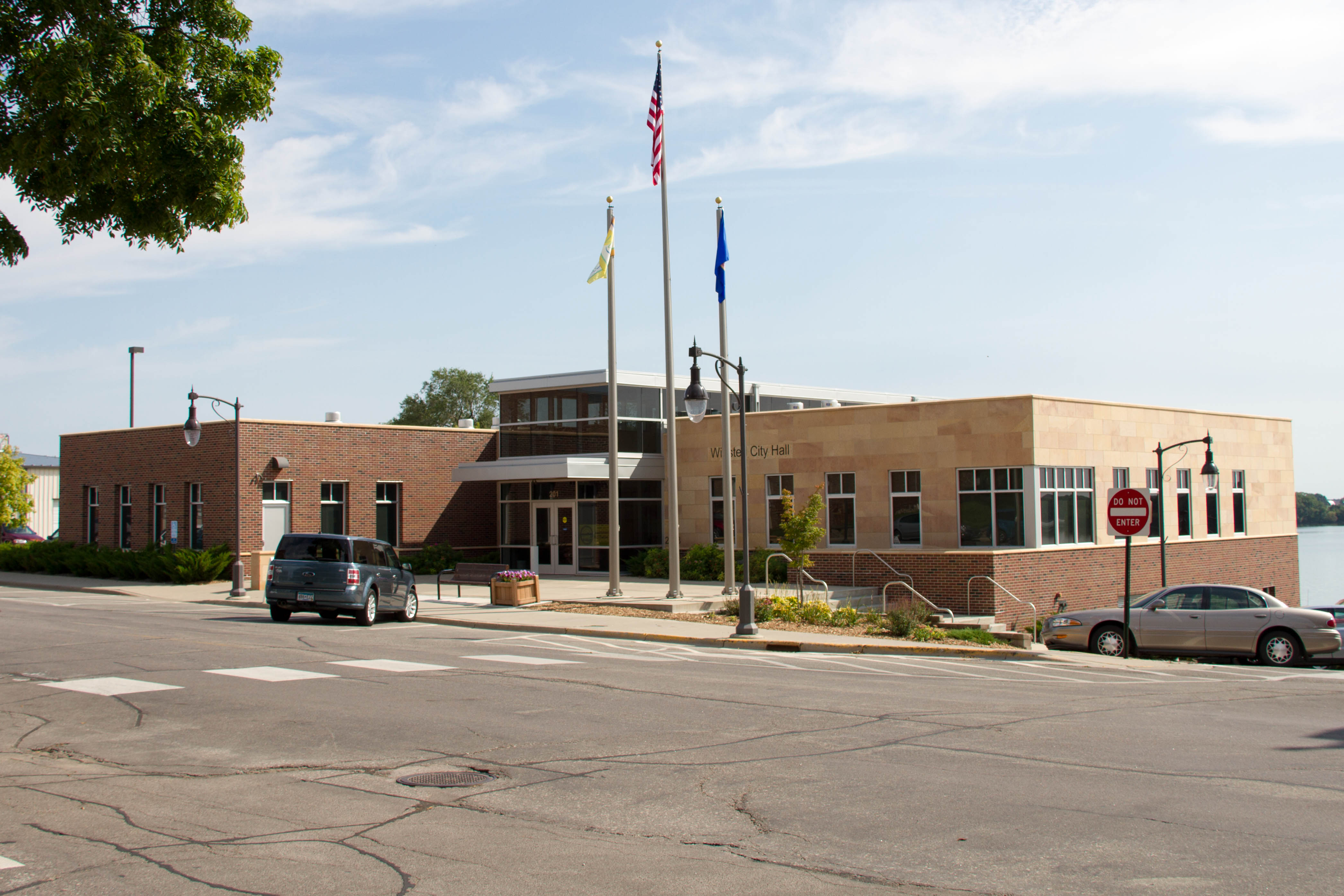
- The new Winsted City Hall

- Flag

- Location in McLeod County and the state of Minnesota
- Coordinates: 44°57′27″N 94°02′59″W
- Country: United States
- State: Minnesota
- County: McLeod
- Named for: Winsted, Connecticut

Area
  - Total: 1.91 sq mi (4.94 km^{2})
  - Land: 1.89 sq mi (4.90 km^{2})
  - Water: 0.015 sq mi (0.04 km^{2})
- Elevation: 1,011 ft (308 m)

Population (2020)
  - Total: 2,240
  - Density: 1,183.9/sq mi (457.12/km^{2})
- Time zone: UTC-6 (Central (CST))
  - Summer (DST): UTC-5 (CDT)
- ZIP code: 55395
- Area code: 320
- FIPS code: 27-71086
- GNIS feature ID: 2397351
- Website: winsted.mn.us

Winsted is a city in McLeod County, Minnesota, United States. The population was 2,240 at the 2020 census.

== History ==
A post office called Winsted has been in operation since 1858. The city was named after Winsted, Connecticut. The name is a portmanteau of the names of two towns, Winchester and Barkhamsted, in Litchfield County, Connecticut. The Electric Short Line (commonly called the Luce Line) provided freight and interurban passenger rail service to Winsted. Passenger service ended by the 1950s, and the Chicago & North Western Railway abandoned the tracks in 1972.

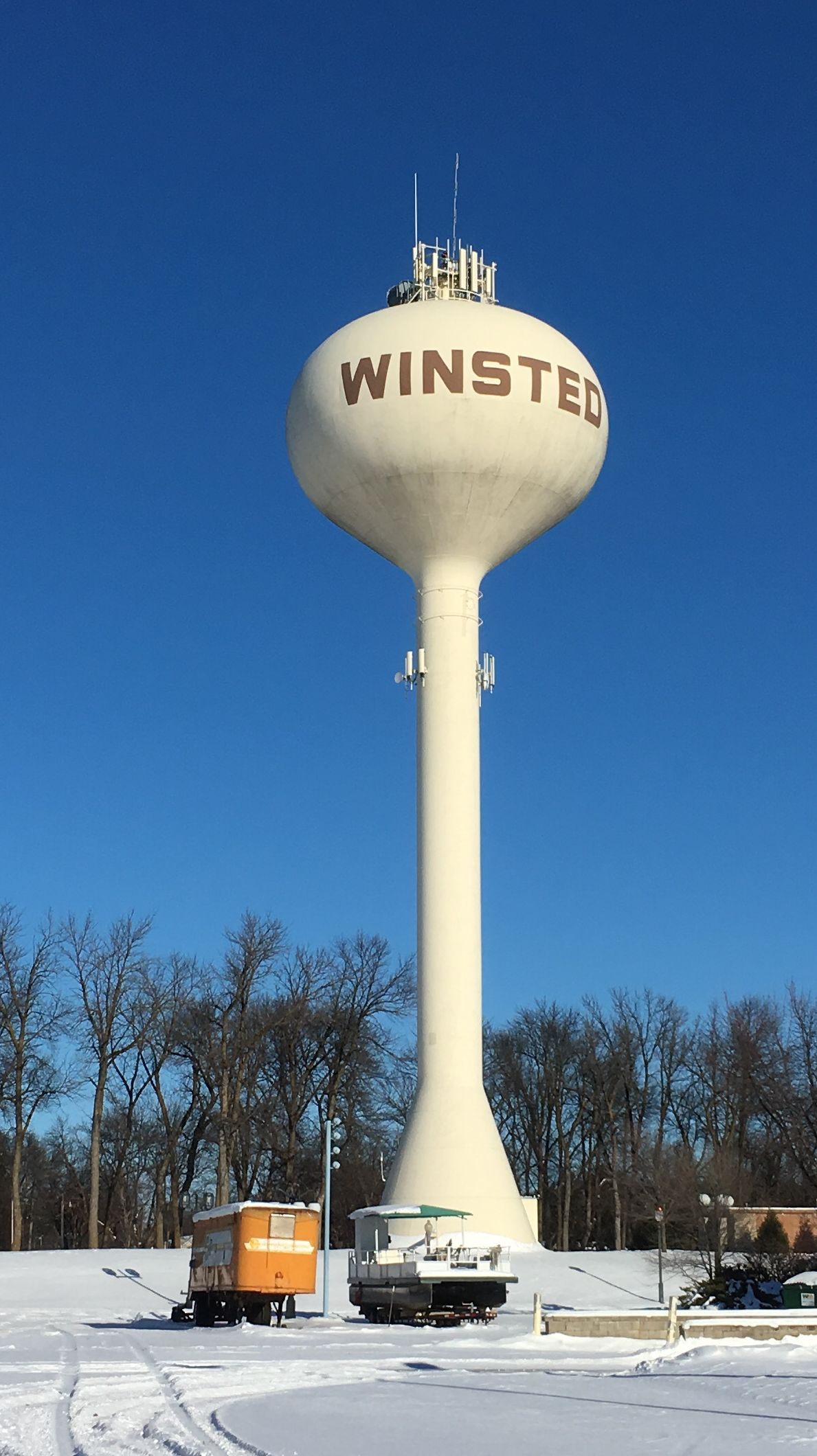
Water tower

== Geography ==
Winsted is in the northeast corner of McLeod County, on the west shore of Winsted Lake. It is 18 miles (29 km) north-northeast of Glencoe, the county seat, 26 miles (42 km) east-northeast of Hutchinson, and 7 miles (11 km) south of Howard Lake in Wright County. McLeod County Roads 1, 5, 6, and 9 are the main routes in the community.

According to the U.S. Census Bureau, the city has an area of 1.91 square miles (4.95 km^{2}), of which 0.015 square miles (0.039 km^{2}), or 0.79%, are water.

== Demographics ==
Historical population
| Census | Pop. | Note | %± |
|---|---|---|---|
| 1880 | 140 | | — |
| 1890 | 267 | | 90.7% |
| 1900 | 281 | | 5.2% |
| 1910 | 296 | | 5.3% |
| 1920 | 434 | | 46.6% |
| 1930 | 482 | | 11.1% |
| 1940 | 660 | | 36.9% |
| 1950 | 941 | | 42.6% |
| 1960 | 1,163 | | 23.6% |
| 1970 | 1,266 | | 8.9% |
| 1980 | 1,522 | | 20.2% |
| 1990 | 1,581 | | 3.9% |
| 2000 | 2,094 | | 32.4% |
| 2010 | 2,355 | | 12.5% |
| 2020 | 2,240 | | −4.9% |
U.S. Decennial Census

=== 2020 census ===
As of the 2020 census, Winsted had a population of 2,240. The median age was 40.8 years. 21.9% of residents were under the age of 18 and 19.6% of residents were 65 years of age or older. For every 100 females there were 98.9 males, and for every 100 females age 18 and over there were 99.2 males age 18 and over.

0.0% of residents lived in urban areas, while 100.0% lived in rural areas.

There were 911 households in Winsted, of which 27.4% had children under the age of 18 living in them. Of all households, 44.7% were married-couple households, 21.1% were households with a male householder and no spouse or partner present, and 22.7% were households with a female householder and no spouse or partner present. About 30.8% of all households were made up of individuals and 11.2% had someone living alone who was 65 years of age or older.

There were 975 housing units, of which 6.6% were vacant. The homeowner vacancy rate was 0.7% and the rental vacancy rate was 5.6%.

Racial composition as of the 2020 census
| Race | Number | Percent |
|---|---|---|
| White | 2,060 | 92.0% |
| Black or African American | 16 | 0.7% |
| American Indian and Alaska Native | 20 | 0.9% |
| Asian | 6 | 0.3% |
| Native Hawaiian and Other Pacific Islander | 1 | 0.0% |
| Some other race | 29 | 1.3% |
| Two or more races | 108 | 4.8% |
| Hispanic or Latino (of any race) | 88 | 3.9% |

=== 2010 census ===
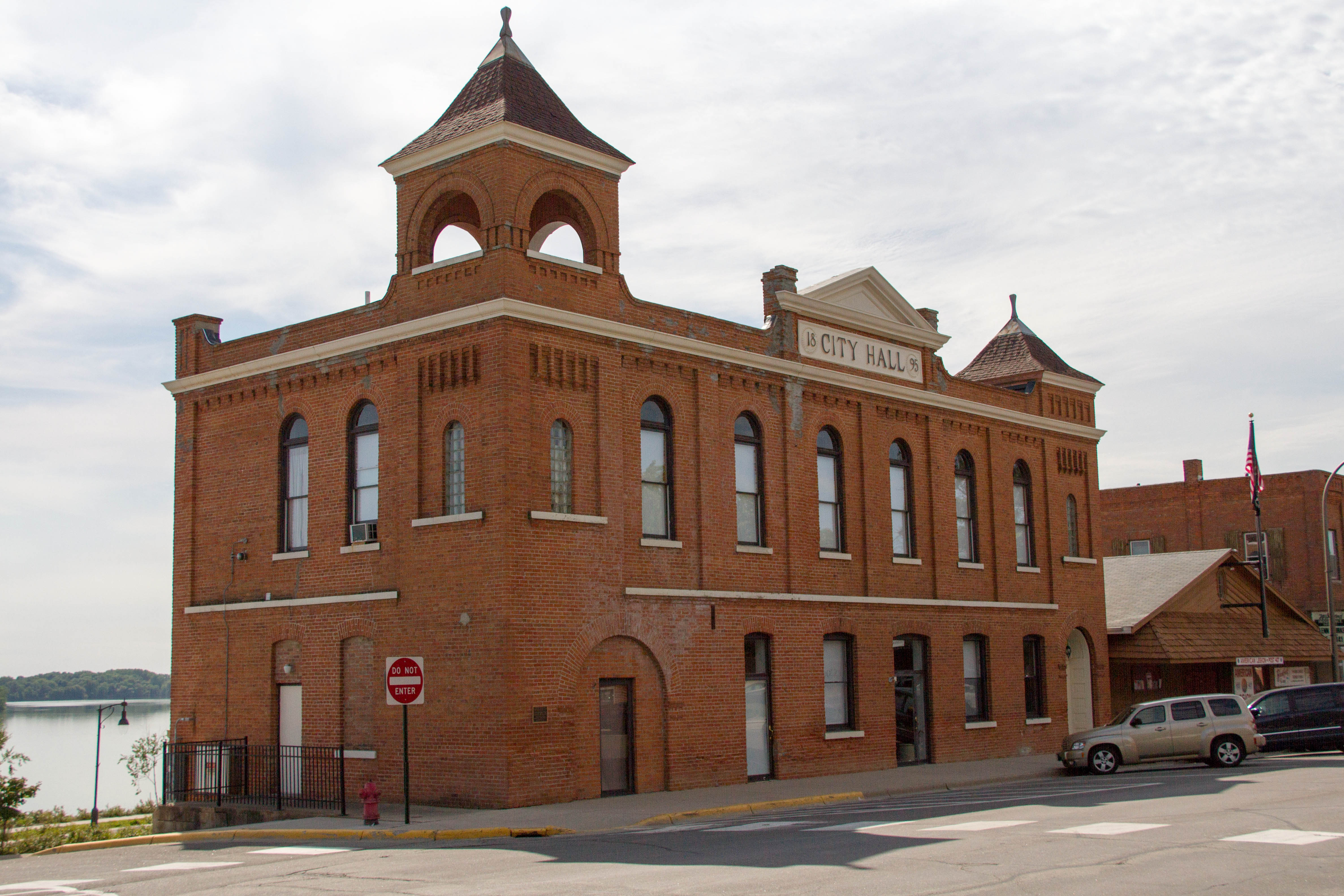
The Old City Hall is listed on the National Register of Historic Places.

As of the census of 2010, there were 2,355 people, 947 households, and 596 families residing in the city. The population density was 1,233.0 inhabitants per square mile (476.1/km^{2}). There were 1,017 housing units at an average density of 532.5 per square mile (205.6/km^{2}). The racial makeup of the city was 97.5% White, 0.5% African American, 0.3% Native American, 0.1% Asian, 0.1% Pacific Islander, 0.9% from other races, and 0.6% from two or more races. Hispanic or Latino of any race were 1.8% of the population.

There were 947 households, of which 33.4% had children under the age of 18 living with them, 46.9% were married couples living together, 9.9% had a female householder with no husband present, 6.1% had a male householder with no wife present, and 37.1% were non-families. 30.4% of all households were made up of individuals, and 11.6% had someone living alone who was 65 years of age or older. The average household size was 2.41 and the average family size was 3.03.

The median age in the city was 36.3 years. 26.1% of residents were under the age of 18; 7.2% were between the ages of 18 and 24; 27.9% were from 25 to 44; 23.6% were from 45 to 64; and 15.2% were 65 years of age or older. The gender makeup of the city was 49.3% male and 50.7% female.

Compared with the 2000 census, the 2010 census showed an increase of 261 individuals, and a .92% increase in diversity.

== Culture ==
Winsted has both a winter and a summer town festival. The Winsted Winter Festival features a lighted parade and various other activities. The Winsted Summer Festival features a parade, street dance, sand volleyball tournament, the crowning of Miss Winsted, and various other activities. Winsted is also home to the Winstock Country Music Festival, the proceeds from which go to the Holy Trinity Catholic school system.

In 2017, a new annual event, the Land Castle Summer Extravaganza, came to Winsted. It takes place on the Winstock Country Music Festival grounds and is the biggest ice fishing event of the summer. It features ice fish house camping, music, vendors, information seminars, and food. It is advertised as family-friendly.

== Education ==
Winsted has two school systems. The Howard Lake–Waverly–Winsted school district is the public school system that operates Winsted Elementary. The Catholic school system comprises Holy Trinity High School, Holy Trinity Elementary School, and Tiny Trojans pre-school.

The Winsted Public Library is part of the Pioneerland Library System.
