= Buffalo Creek (Crow River tributary) =

Coordinates: 44°51′16″N 93°59′52″W

Location
- Country: United States

Physical characteristics
- Source
  - location: Kandiyohi County, Minnesota
  - elevation: 1125 ft
- Mouth
  - location: Carver County, Minnesota
  - elevation: 942 ft

Buffalo Creek is an 84.3-mile-long (135.7 km) river in central Minnesota. It is a tributary of the South Fork of the Crow River, which is a tributary of the Mississippi River.

Buffalo Creek was so named from the fact buffalo bones were found there by pioneer settlers. The area around this river was well known to the Dakota people as an excellent hunting ground of buffalo and other ruminants, and so the river was historically known as "Ṭaṗá Oháƞpi Wakpá", or the "Animal Head Broth River".

== See also ==
- List of rivers of Minnesota
