= Lester Prairie, Minnesota =

City in Minnesota, United States

- City
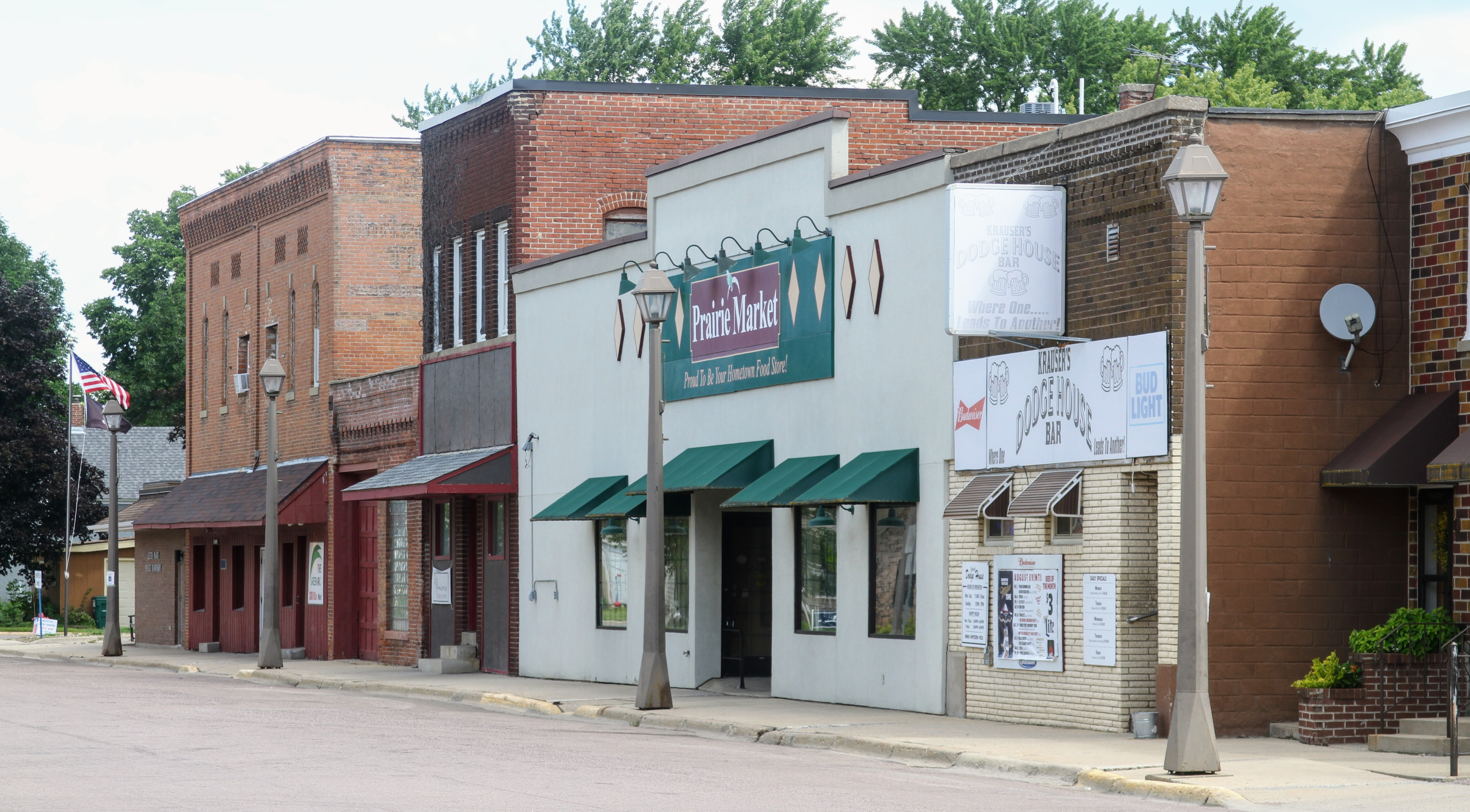
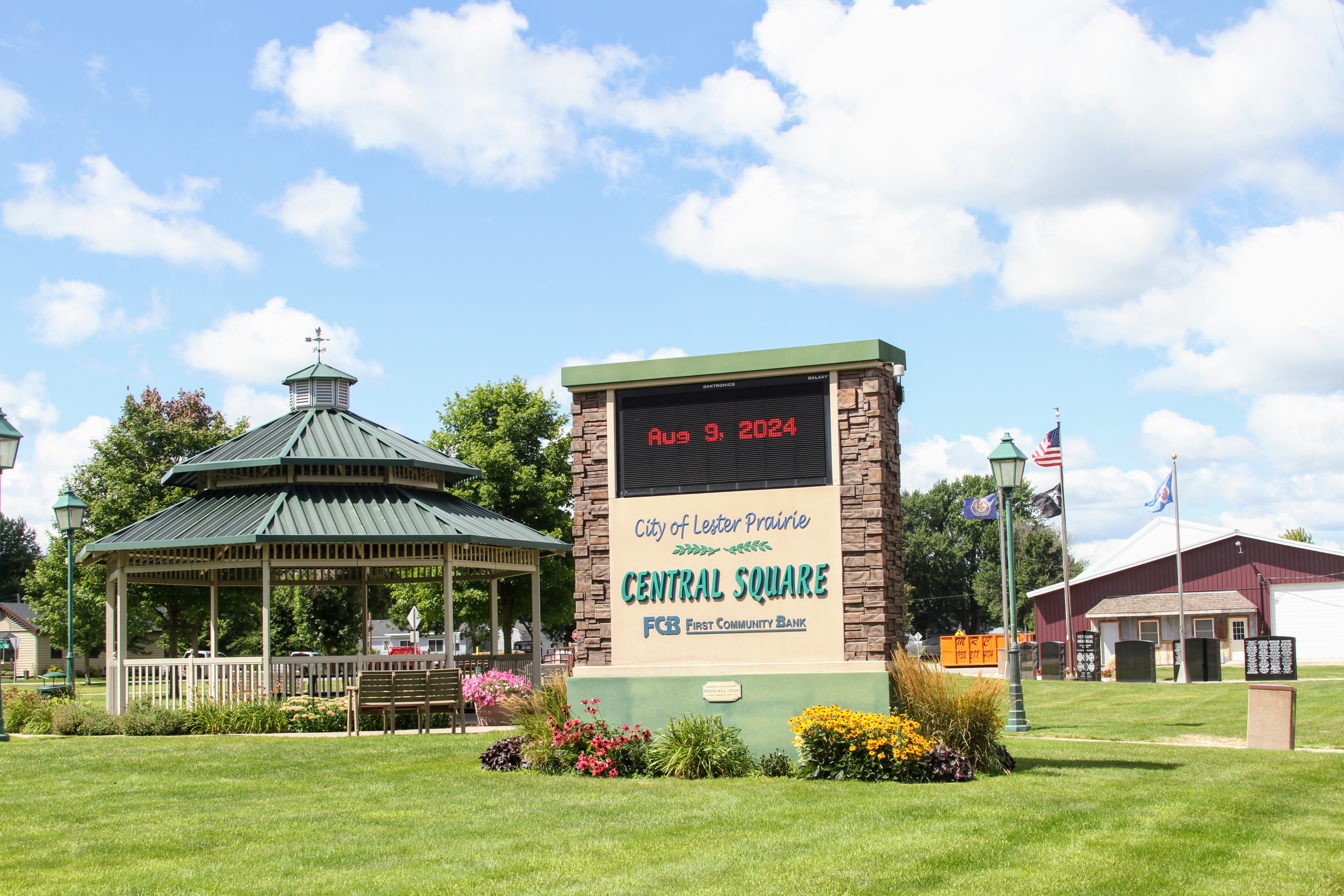
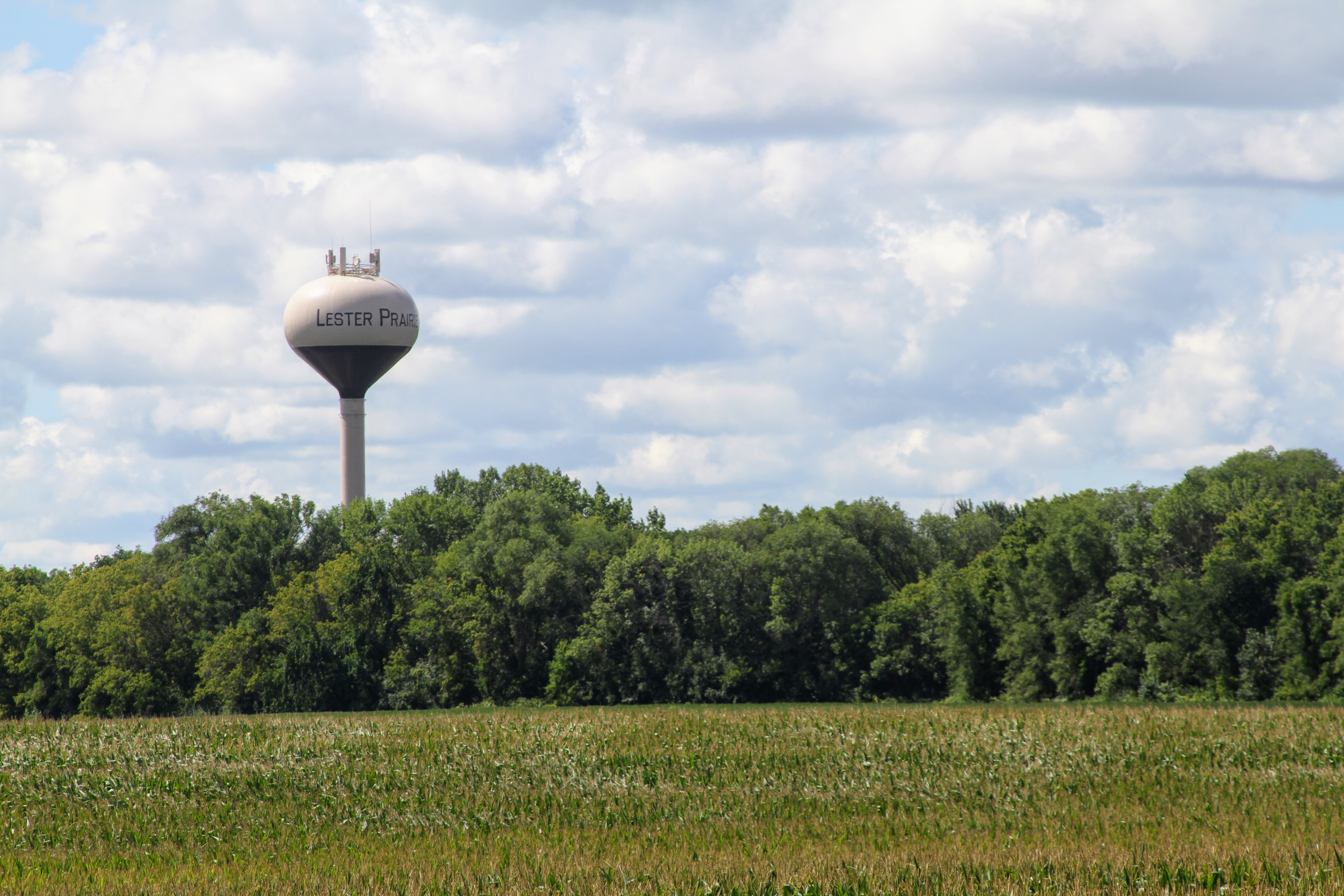

- Location in McLeod County and the state of Minnesota
- Coordinates: 44°53′01″N 94°02′14″W
- Country: United States
- State: Minnesota
- County: McLeod

Area
  - Total: 0.90 sq mi (2.32 km^{2})
  - Land: 0.90 sq mi (2.32 km^{2})
  - Water: 0 sq mi (0.00 km^{2})
- Elevation: 981 ft (299 m)

Population (2020)
  - Total: 1,894
  - Density: 2,117.0/sq mi (817.36/km^{2})
- Time zone: UTC-6 (Central (CST))
  - Summer (DST): UTC-5 (CDT)
- ZIP code: 55354
- Area code: 320
- FIPS code: 27-36728
- GNIS feature ID: 2395687
- Website: www.lesterprairiemn.us

Lester Prairie is a city in McLeod County, Minnesota, United States, along the South Fork of the Crow River. The population was 1,894 at the 2020 census.

== History ==
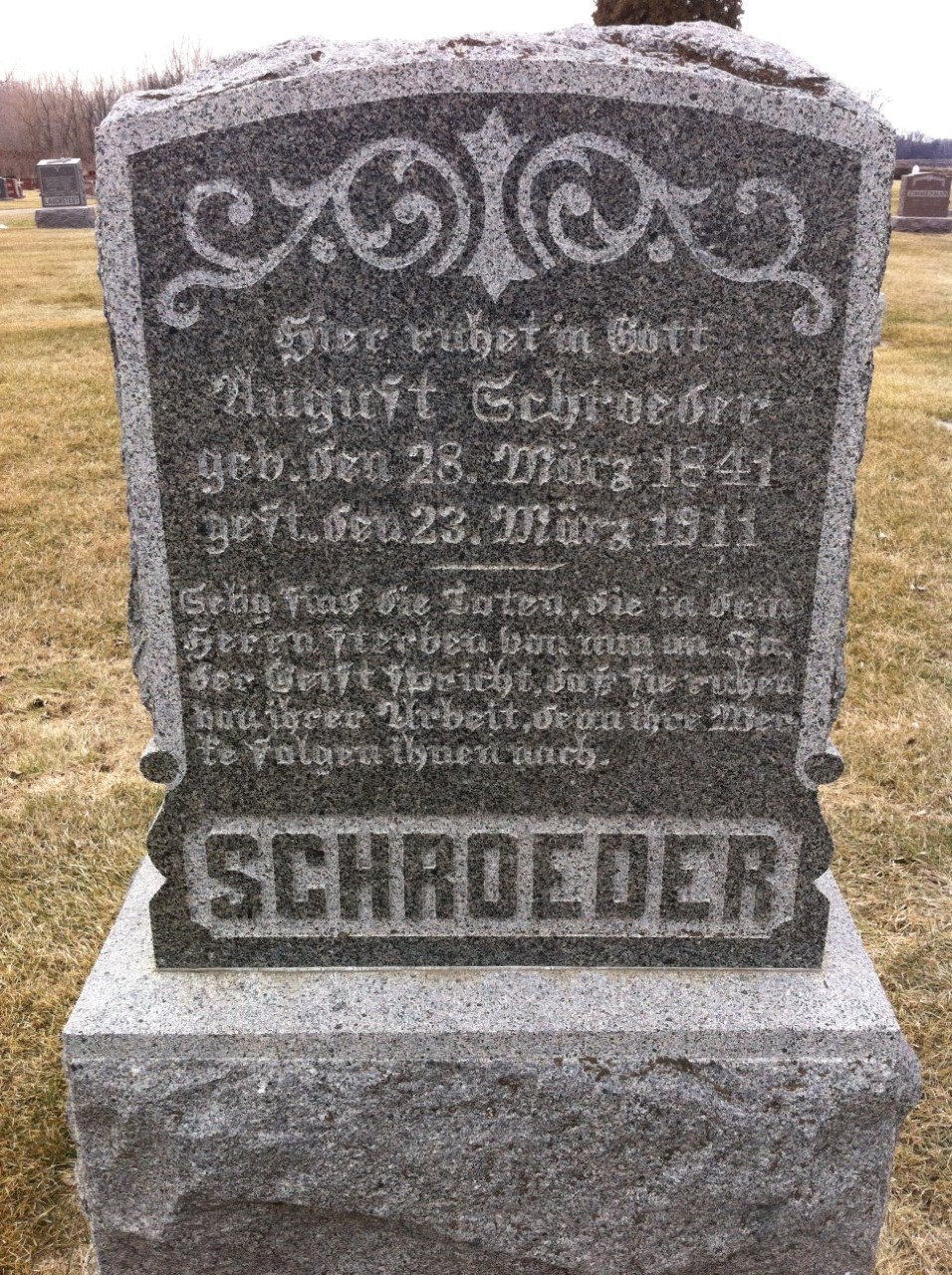
Gravestone carved in German, from days when there was a large German population in Lester Prairie

Lester Prairie was platted in 1886 and named for John N. Lester, an original owner of the town site. A post office has been in operation at Lester Prairie since 1888. Lester Prairie was incorporated in 1888.

== Geography ==
The city is in eastern McLeod County. Minnesota State Highway 7 passes 1 mile (1.6 km) north of the city, leading west 16 miles (26 km) to Hutchinson and east 42 miles (68 km) to Minneapolis. Glencoe, the McLeod county seat, is 13 miles (21 km) to the southwest. McLeod County Roads 1, 9, and 23 are the main local routes in the community. A bike trail running east–west through the middle of town, the Dakota Rail Regional Trail, connects Lester Prairie to the Twin Cities.

According to the U.S. Census Bureau, Lester Prairie has a total area of 1.00 square mile (2.59 km^{2}), of which 0.001 square miles (0.003 km^{2}), or 0.1%, are water. The South Fork of the Crow River, a tributary of the Mississippi River, flows past the southeast corner of the city.

== Demographics ==
Historical population
Census	Pop.	Note	%±
1890	189		—
1900	418		121.2%
1910	420		0.5%
1920	434		3.3%
1930	442		1.8%
1940	423		−4.3%
1950	663		56.7%
1960	966		45.7%
1970	1,162		20.3%
1980	1,229		5.8%
1990	1,180		−4.0%
2000	1,377		16.7%
2010	1,730		25.6%
2020	1,894		9.5%
U.S. Decennial Census

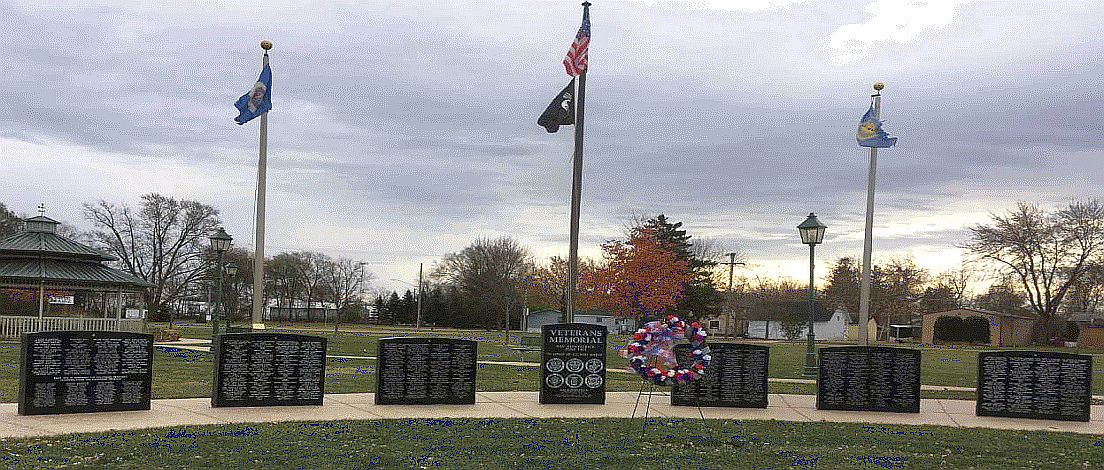
Veterans memorial in city park

=== 2020 census ===
As of the 2020 census, Lester Prairie had a population of 1,894. The median age was 36.1 years. 28.5% of residents were under the age of 18 and 12.9% of residents were 65 years of age or older. For every 100 females there were 97.9 males, and for every 100 females age 18 and over there were 95.7 males age 18 and over.

0.0% of residents lived in urban areas, while 100.0% lived in rural areas.

There were 726 households in Lester Prairie, of which 35.4% had children under the age of 18 living in them. Of all households, 53.7% were married-couple households, 16.5% were households with a male householder and no spouse or partner present, and 21.3% were households with a female householder and no spouse or partner present. About 26.9% of all households were made up of individuals and 10.8% had someone living alone who was 65 years of age or older.

There were 742 housing units, of which 2.2% were vacant. The homeowner vacancy rate was 1.0% and the rental vacancy rate was 4.4%.

Racial composition as of the 2020 census
Race	Number	Percent
White	1,593	84.1%
Black or African American	9	0.5%
American Indian and Alaska Native	8	0.4%
Asian	9	0.5%
Native Hawaiian and Other Pacific Islander	1	0.1%
Some other race	101	5.3%
Two or more races	173	9.1%
Hispanic or Latino (of any race)	265	14.0%

=== 2010 census ===
As of the census of 2010, there were 1,730 people, 654 households, and 463 families living in the city. The population density was 2,011.6 inhabitants per square mile (776.7/km^{2}). There were 704 housing units at an average density of 818.6 per square mile (316.1/km^{2}). The racial makeup of the city was 93.9% White, 0.2% African American, 0.2% Native American, 1.1% Asian, 3.8% from other races, and 0.9% from two or more races. Hispanic or Latino of any race were 9.3% of the population.

There were 654 households, of which 37.3% had children under the age of 18 living with them, 58.0% were married couples living together, 8.0% had a female householder with no husband present, 4.9% had a male householder with no wife present, and 29.2% were non-families. 21.3% of all households were made up of individuals, and 9% had someone living alone who was 65 years of age or older. The average household size was 2.65 and the average family size was 3.11.

The median age in the city was 33.8 years. 28% of residents were under the age of 18; 7.6% were between the ages of 18 and 24; 29.3% were from 25 to 44; 23.5% were from 45 to 64; and 11.7% were 65 years of age or older. The gender makeup of the city was 49.5% male and 50.5% female.

=== 2000 census ===
As of the census of 2000, there were 1,377 people, 516 households, and 379 families living in the city. The population density was 1,910.4 inhabitants per square mile (737.6/km^{2}). There were 531 housing units at an average density of 736.7 per square mile (284.4/km^{2}). The racial makeup of the city was 97.68% White, 0.07% Native American, 0.07% Asian, 1.89% from other races, and 0.29% from two or more races. Hispanic or Latino of any race were 4.94% of the population.

There were 516 households, out of which 38.0% had children under the age of 18 living with them, 62.2% were married couples living together, 7.8% had a female householder with no husband present, and 26.4% were non-families. 22.7% of all households were made up of individuals, and 9.5% had someone living alone who was 65 years of age or older. The average household size was 2.67 and the average family size was 3.14.

In the city, the population was spread out, with 29.9% under the age of 18, 6.9% from 18 to 24, 30.2% from 25 to 44, 19.5% from 45 to 64, and 13.5% who were 65 years of age or older. The median age was 34 years. For every 100 females, there were 95.6 males. For every 100 females age 18 and over, there were 96.9 males.

The median income for a household in the city was $44,271, and the median income for a family was $52,417. Males had a median income of $35,463 versus $25,313 for females. The per capita income for the city was $18,223. About 2.9% of families and 5.1% of the population were below the poverty line, including 6.4% of those under age 18 and 5.0% of those age 65 or over.

== Politics ==
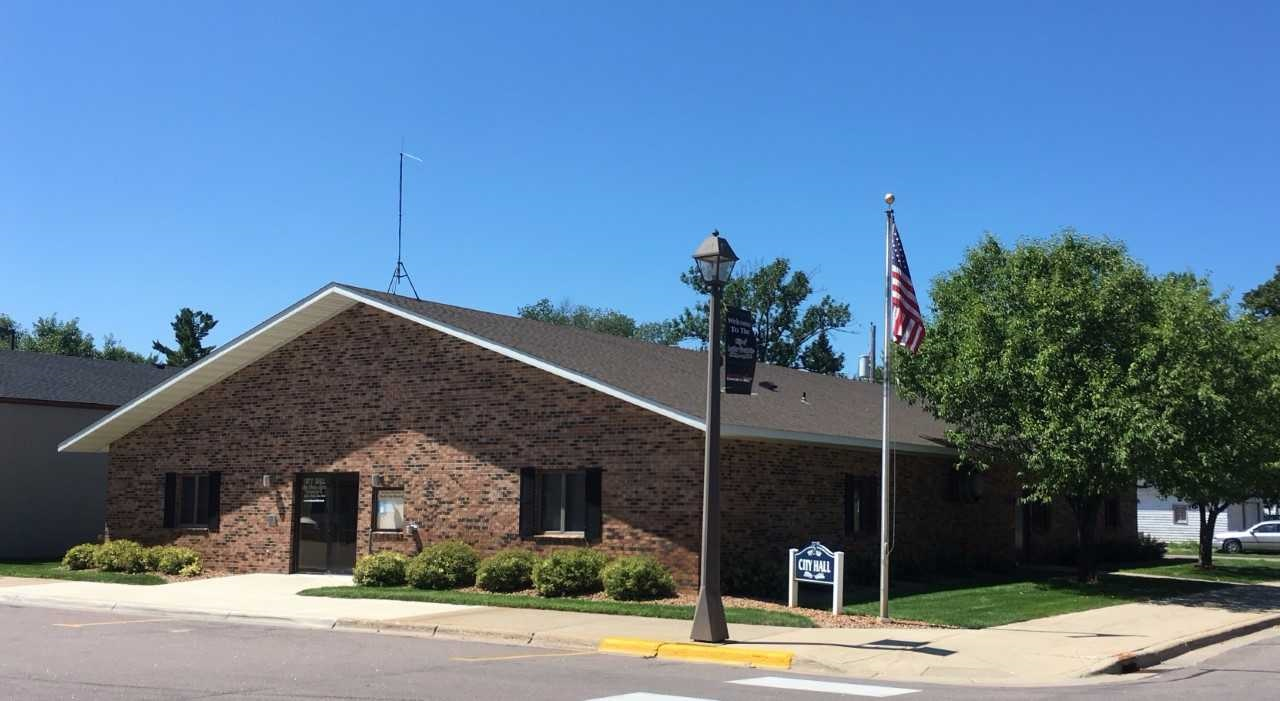
City Hall

Presidential election results

2020 Precinct Results Spreadsheet2016 Precinct Results Spreadsheet2012 Precinct Results Spreadsheet2008 Precinct Results Spreadsheet2004 Precinct Results Spreadsheet2000 Precinct Results Spreadsheet1996 Precinct Results1992 Precinct Results1988 Precinct Results1984 Precinct Results1980 Precinct Results1976 Precinct Results1968 Precinct Results1964 Precinct Results1960 Precinct Results
Year	Republican	Democratic	Third parties
2020	72.7% 719	26.1% 258	1.2% 12
2016	69.8% 615	22.6% 199	7.6% 67
2012	63.0% 539	34.5% 295	2.5% 22
2008	59.8% 515	36.9% 318	3.3% 28
2004	68.8% 529	29.8% 229	1.4% 11
2000	58.6% 360	31.3% 192	10.1% 62
1996	38.4% 222	43.4% 251	18.2% 105
1992	39.1% 245	30.4% 190	30.5% 191
1988	61.4% 344	38.6% 216	0.0% 0
1984	70.5% 404	29.5% 169	0.0% 0
1980	61.8% 375	30.0% 176	9.2% 56
1976	53.2% 268	44.2% 223	2.6% 13
1968	68.3% 319	29.1% 136	2.6% 12
1964	62.6% 278	37.4% 166	0.0% 0
1960	82.8% 362	16.9% 74	0.3% 1

== Lester Prairie Schools ==
Lester Prairie is home to ISD #424 Lester Prairie Schools. The school is a K-12 school with both elementary and high school located in one building. There are approximately 400 students enrolled. Dr. Melissa Radeke is the district's superintendent. Mike Lee is the K-12 principal.

== Notable people ==
- Rene Clausen, noted composer and conductor of The Concordia Choir; raised in Lester Prairie
