= Area code 320 =

Telephone area code in central Minnesota

Coordinates: 45°27′N 94°45′W

The numbering plan areas of Minnesota, with 320 in light brown.

Area code 320 is a telephone area code in the North American Numbering Plan for most of the central part of the U.S. state of Minnesota. The numbering plan area (NPA) excludes the Twin Cities metro region. The area code was created in 1996 in a split of area code 612.

== History ==
In 1995, US West advised the North American Numbering Plan Administration (NANPA) that substantial demand for telephone numbers in Minneapolis/St. Paul required dividing numbering plan area 612 with the introduction of a new area code, 320, outside of the metro area. The split became effective on March 17, 1996, with a period of permissive dialing of 612 or 320 ending on September 15 for calls to a 320 destination. The Twin Cities retained the existing area code. Some exchanges, in Red Wing, Wabasha, Goodhue, Lake City, and White Rock in the south-eastern corner of the area were migrated to area code 507 instead of receiving a new area code. This required changing central office predix and station number changes for customers in the 345, 380, and 388 exchange areas, to mitigate numbering conflicts in NPA 507.

320 was the fourth Minnesota area code, and the first new one in the state in 42 years.

In 1998, numbering plan area 612 was reduced to only Minneapolis and a few inner suburbs, when area code 651 was created. The 651 area borders Wisconsin, while area codes 763 and 952 were split from 612 in 2000. Area code 218 borders 320 to the north, and area code 507 covers southern Minnesota. 320 now borders every Minnesota area code except 612, the numbering plan area from which it first was created.

== Service area ==
- Albany
- Alexandria
- Annandale
- Appleton
- Askov
- Atwater
- Avon
- Benson
- Bird Island
- Biscay
- Boyd
- Braham
- Browns Valley
- Browerville
- Brownton
- Buffalo Lake
- Clara City
- Clarissa
- Clarkfield
- Clear Lake
- Clearwater
- Cokato
- Cold Spring
- Collegeville
- Danube
- Dassel
- Dawson
- Eden Valley
- Farwell
- Foley
- Garrison
- Glencoe
- Glenwood
- Granite Falls
- Hector
- Hinckley
- Holdingford
- Howard Lake
- Hutchinson
- Isle
- Kimball
- Lester Prairie
- Litchfield
- Little Falls
- Long Beach
- Long Prairie
- Lowry
- Madison
- Maple Lake
- Melrose
- Milaca
- Montevideo
- Mora
- Morris
- New London
- Ogilvie
- Olivia
- Onamia
- Ortonville
- Osakis
- Paynesville
- Pierz
- Pine City
- Randall
- Renville
- Rice
- Richmond
- Rock Creek
- Rockville
- Royalton
- Rush City
- Sacred Heart
- St. Augusta
- St. Cloud
- St. Joseph
- Sandstone
- Sartell
- Sauk Centre
- Sauk Rapids
- Spicer
- Starbuck
- Stewart
- Upsala
- Waite Park
- Watkins
- Wheaton
- Willmar
- Winsted

== See also ==
- List of Minnesota area codes
- List of North American Numbering Plan area codes

Minnesota area codes: 218, 320, 507/924, 612, 651, 763, 952
	North: 218	
West: 605, 701	320	East: 534/715, 763, 952
	South: 507/924, 651	
North Dakota area codes: 701
South Dakota area codes: 605
Wisconsin area codes: 262, 414, 608/353, 715/534, 920/274
