= Crow River (Minnesota) =

Crow River Karishon
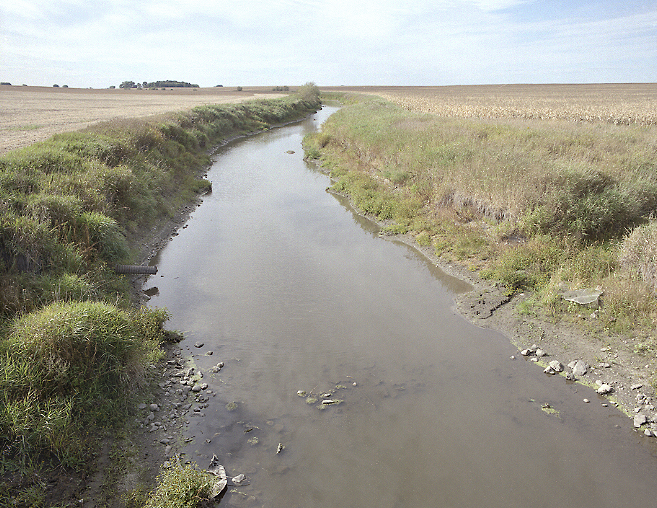
- Channelized section of the South Fork of the Crow River near Cosmos in Meeker County

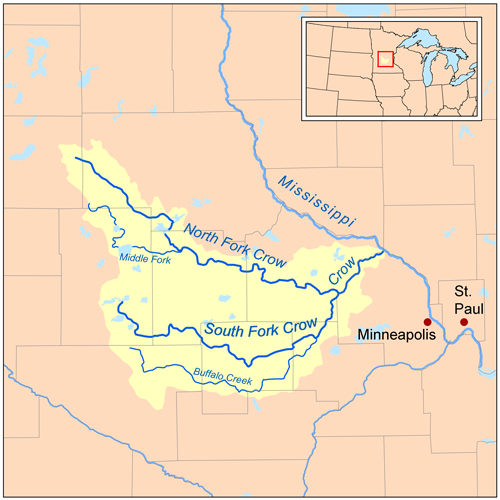
- Map of the Crow River watershed.
- Native name: Khaŋǧí Šúŋ Wakpa (Dakota)

Location
- Country: United States
- State: Minnesota
- County: Hennepin County, Wright County

Physical characteristics
- Source: Confluence of North Fork Crow River and South Fork Crow River
  - location: Rockford
  - coordinates: 45.0813519°N 93.7624663°W
- Mouth: Mississippi River
  - location: Dayton and Otsego
  - coordinates: 45.2457984°N 93.5224579°W
- Discharge
  - location: mouth
  - average: 1,166.56 cu ft/s (33.033 m^{3}/s) (estimate)

The Crow River is a tributary of the Mississippi River in south-central Minnesota in the United States. It drains a watershed of 2,756 square miles (7,140 km^{2}).

== Name ==
The earliest record of the name for Crow River is "Karishon River", reflecting the Dakota language Khaŋǧí Šúŋ Watpá (now Wakpá), meaning "The Large Wing-feather of the Crow River". In other documents, this was translated as "Crow Wing River", or by its Ojibwe language name "Undeg-sipi" (from Aandego-ziibi), meaning "Crow River". Early explorers recorded the name of this river in various ways: "Goose River" by Jonathan Carver, "Rook's River" by Giacomo Beltrami, and as "Karishon or Crow River" by Joseph Nicollet. The North Fork of the Crow River was named by the Ojibwe Indians for the bird they called the "marauder of newly planted corn."

== Hydrography ==
The Crow River flows for most of its length as three streams:

- The North Fork Crow River, 157.5 miles (253.4 km) long, flows from Grove Lake in eastern Pope County and follows a generally east-southeastward course through southwestern Stearns, northeastern Kandiyohi, northern Meeker and central Wright counties, through Rice Lake and Lake Koronis and past the towns of Regal, Paynesville and Kingston. A minor headwaters tributary of the North Fork is named the Skunk River. The average discharge of the North Fork Crow River, based on data gathered at the USGS station at Paynesville, and data gathered at the USGS station on the Middle Fork Crow River at Spicer (the North Fork is measured above where the Middle Fork flows in), is 173 cubic feet per second. See below for the link to the Spicer station.
- The Middle Fork Crow River, 45.1 miles (72.6 km) long, rises near Belgrade in southwestern Stearns County and flows into Kandiyohi County, initially southward through Mud Lake and Nest Lake and past the town of New London, eastward through Green Lake and Calhoun Lake and into northern Meeker County, where it joins the North Fork. At Spicer, the river measures approximately 67 cubic feet per second.
- The South Fork Crow River, 116.0 miles (186.7 km) long, flows from Wakanda and Little Kandiyohi lakes in south-central Kandiyohi County and follows a generally eastward course through southwestern Meeker, northern McLeod, northwestern Carver and southeastern Wright counties, past the towns of Cosmos, Hutchinson, Lester Prairie, Mayer, Watertown and Delano. Portions of the South Fork's upper course have been heavily straightened and channelized. At Mayer, the river has a mean annual discharge of 259 cubic feet per second.

The north and south forks converge at Rockford to form the Crow River, which flows for 24.8 miles (39.9 km) northeastward to the Mississippi River. The river's course is used to define the boundary between Wright and Hennepin counties.

The Crow flows through Greenfield, Hanover, St. Michael, Otsego and Dayton; it enters the Mississippi River from the south at the common boundary between Otsego and Dayton.

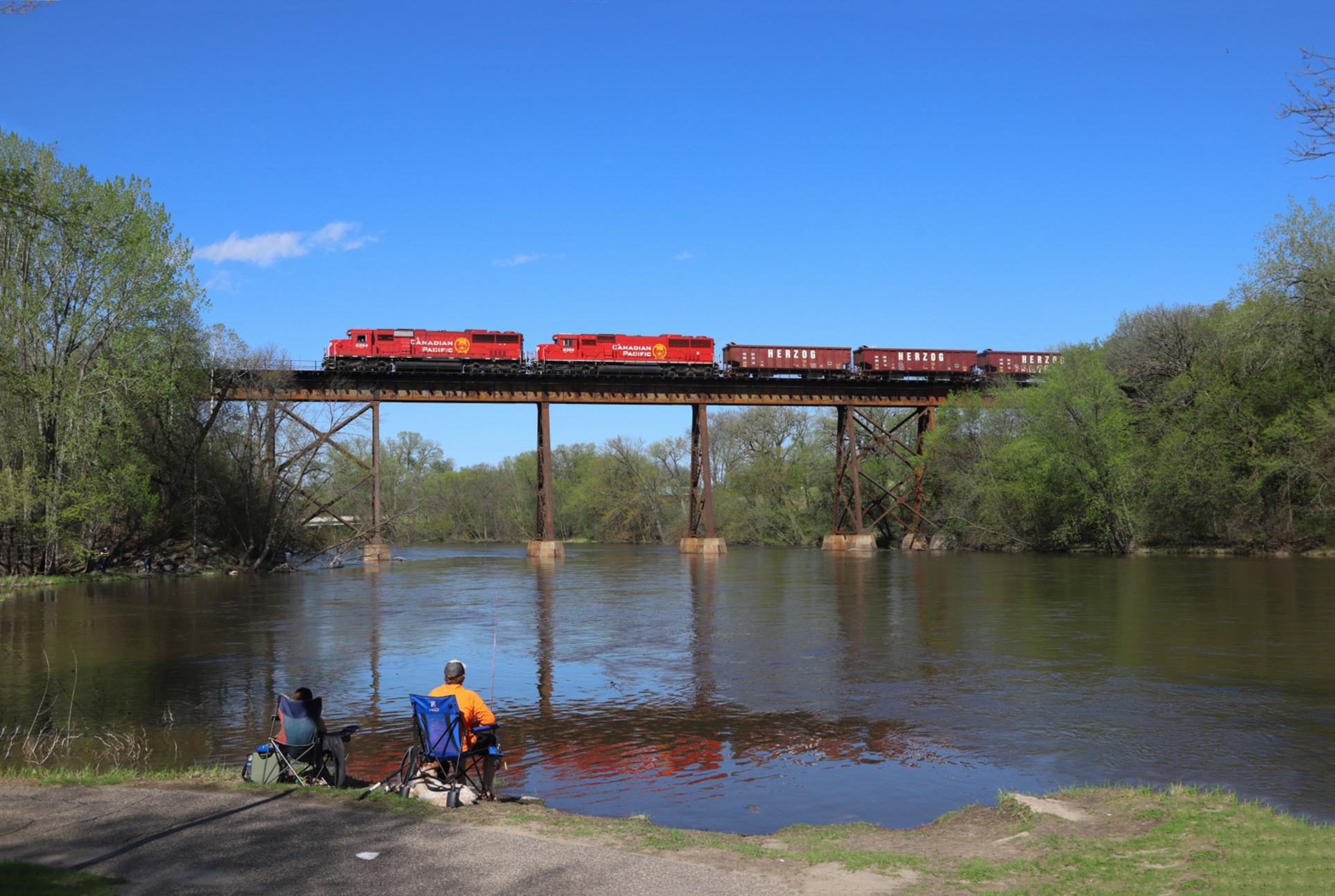
Crow River at Rockford, Minnesota

== Landscape ==
The Crow River, North Fork flows southeast from Lake Koronis for about 125 miles until it joins the Mississippi River at Dayton. The roughly 40 mile stretch from upstream of Rockford to the Mississippi is considered to be the best for canoeing. Upstream from Buffalo, you will encounter more challenging paddling due to sandy, erodible banks and fast-growing silver maples that frequently fall and block the river. In this stretch, you may see more wildlife, but you have to work harder to get around numerous obstacles.

== See also ==
- List of rivers of Minnesota
