= Glencoe, Minnesota =

City in the United States

- City
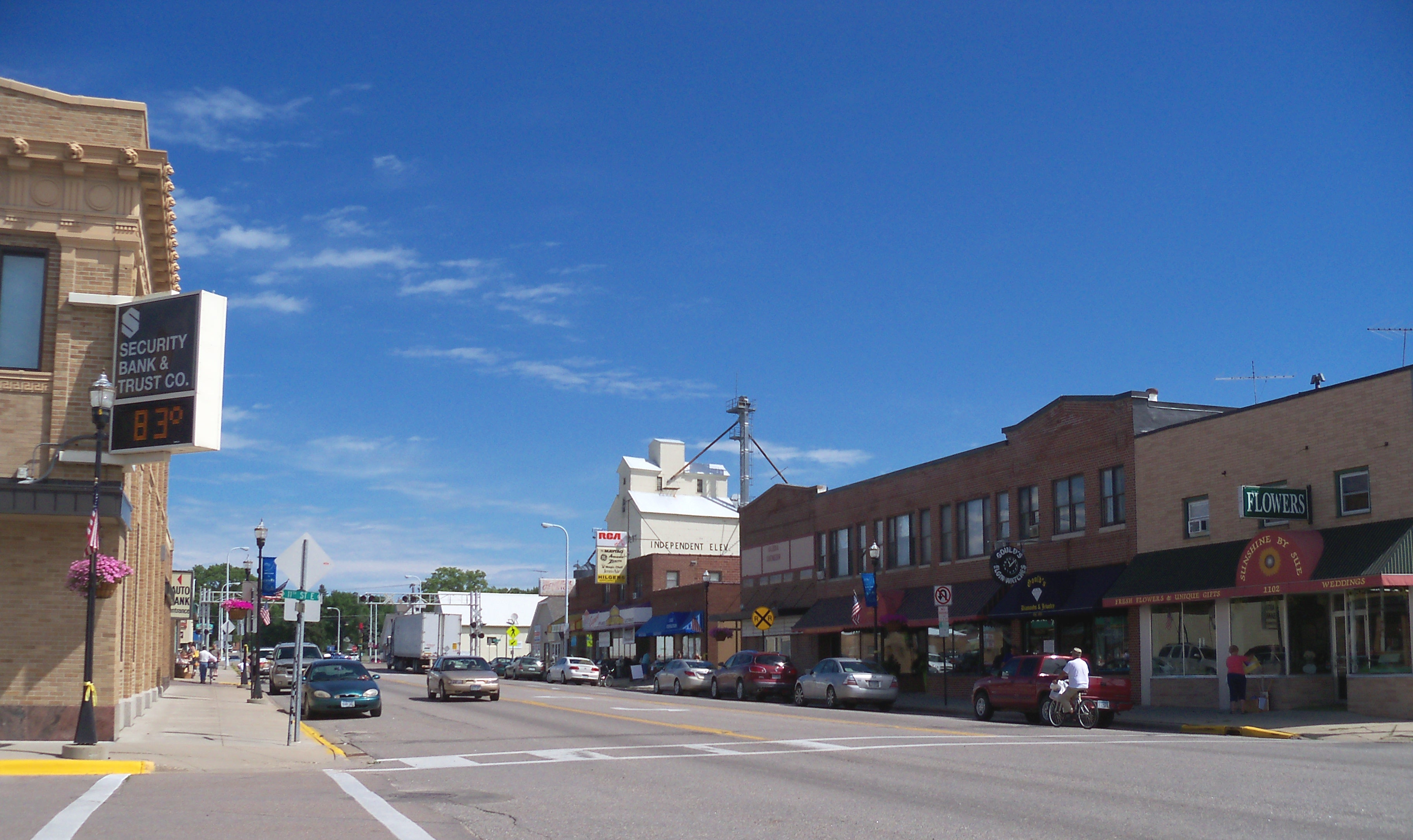
- Downtown Glencoe
- Motto(s): "Small City, Big Future"
- Location in McLeod County and the state of Minnesota
- Coordinates: 44°46′14″N 94°09′04″W
- Country: United States
- State: Minnesota
- County: McLeod

Area
  - Total: 3.17 sq mi (8.21 km^{2})
  - Land: 3.17 sq mi (8.20 km^{2})
  - Water: 0.0077 sq mi (0.02 km^{2})
- Elevation: 1,001 ft (305 m)

Population (2020)
  - Total: 5,744
  - Density: 1,815.1/sq mi (700.81/km^{2})
- Time zone: UTC-6 (Central (CST))
  - Summer (DST): UTC-5 (CDT)
- ZIP code: 55336
- Area code: 320
- FIPS code: 27-23948
- GNIS feature ID: 2394912
- Website: www.glencoemn.org

Glencoe (/ˈɡlɛnkoʊ/ GLEN-koh) is a city and the county seat of McLeod County, Minnesota, United States. The population was 5,744 at the 2020 census.

== History ==
Glencoe was laid out in 1855 and named after Glen Coe in Scotland. A post office has been in operation at Glencoe since 1856. Glencoe was incorporated as a city in 1909.

== Geography ==
Glencoe is in southeastern McLeod County. U.S. Route 212 passes through the south side of the city, leading east 11 miles (18 km) to Norwood Young America and west 29 miles (47 km) to Hector. Minneapolis is 54 miles (87 km) to the east. Minnesota State Highway 22 passes through the center of Glencoe, leading northwest 14 miles (23 km) to Hutchinson, the largest city in McLeod County, and south-southwest 17 miles (27 km) to Gaylord.

According to the U.S. Census Bureau, Glencoe has an area of 3.17 square miles (8.21 km^{2}), of which 0.01 square miles (0.03 km^{2}) are water. Buffalo Creek passes through the south side of the city, part of the Crow River watershed leading northeast to the Mississippi River.

== Demographics ==
Historical population
Census	Pop.	Note	%±
1880	1,078		—
1890	1,649		53.0%
1900	1,780		7.9%
1910	1,788		0.4%
1920	1,747		−2.3%
1930	1,925		10.2%
1940	2,387		24.0%
1950	2,801		17.3%
1960	3,216		14.8%
1970	4,217		31.1%
1980	4,396		4.2%
1990	4,648		5.7%
2000	5,453		17.3%
2010	5,631		3.3%
2020	5,744		2.0%
U.S. Decennial Census

=== 2020 census ===
As of the 2020 census, Glencoe had a population of 5,744. The median age was 39.1 years. 24.2% of residents were under the age of 18 and 19.3% of residents were 65 years of age or older. For every 100 females there were 95.8 males, and for every 100 females age 18 and over there were 94.9 males age 18 and over.

99.9% of residents lived in urban areas, while 0.1% lived in rural areas.

There were 2,345 households in Glencoe, of which 29.2% had children under the age of 18 living in them. Of all households, 47.2% were married-couple households, 18.7% were households with a male householder and no spouse or partner present, and 26.8% were households with a female householder and no spouse or partner present. About 31.4% of all households were made up of individuals and 14.5% had someone living alone who was 65 years of age or older.

There were 2,479 housing units, of which 5.4% were vacant. The homeowner vacancy rate was 1.2% and the rental vacancy rate was 7.7%.

Racial composition as of the 2020 census
Race	Number	Percent
White	4,743	82.6%
Black or African American	30	0.5%
American Indian and Alaska Native	22	0.4%
Asian	45	0.8%
Native Hawaiian and Other Pacific Islander	1	0.0%
Some other race	336	5.8%
Two or more races	567	9.9%
Hispanic or Latino (of any race)	983	17.1%

=== 2010 census ===
As of the census of 2010, there were 5,631 people, 2,220 households, and 1,467 families living in the city. The population density was 1,748.8 inhabitants per square mile (675.2/km^{2}). There were 2,424 housing units at an average density of 752.8 per square mile (290.7/km^{2}). The racial makeup of the city was 92.0% White, 0.6% African American, 0.6% Native American, 0.8% Asian, 4.8% from other races, and 1.2% from two or more races. Hispanic or Latino of any race were 14.8% of the population.

There were 2,220 households, of which 33.9% had children under the age of 18 living with them, 52.3% were married couples living together, 9.3% had a female householder with no husband present, 4.4% had a male householder with no wife present, and 33.9% were non-families. 29.3% of all households were made up of individuals, and 14.2% had someone living alone who was 65 years of age or older. The average household size was 2.48 and the average family size was 3.06.

The median age in the city was 37.7 years. 26.2% of residents were under the age of 18; 7.7% were between the ages of 18 and 24; 26.5% were from 25 to 44; 22.5% were from 45 to 64; and 17.1% were 65 years of age or older. The gender makeup of the city was 48.5% male and 51.5% female.

=== 2000 census ===
As of the census of 2000, there were 5,453 people, 2,103 households, and 1,446 families living in the city. The population density was 2,045.6 inhabitants per square mile (789.8/km^{2}). There were 2,169 housing units at an average density of 813.7 per square mile (314.2/km^{2}). The racial makeup of the city was 93.25% White, 0.17% African American, 0.28% Native American, 0.57% Asian, 0.13% Pacific Islander, 5.17% from other races, and 0.44% from two or more races. Hispanic or Latino of any race were 12.97% of the population.

There were 2,103 households, out of which 34.8% had children under the age of 18 living with them, 57.8% were married couples living together, 8.0% had a female householder with no husband present, and 31.2% were non-families. 27.3% of all households were made up of individuals, and 14.9% had someone living alone who was 65 years of age or older. The average household size was 2.53 and the average family size was 3.10.

In the city, the population was spread out, with 27.9% under the age of 18, 7.0% from 18 to 24, 28.6% from 25 to 44, 19.1% from 45 to 64, and 17.3% who were 65 years of age or older. The median age was 36 years. For every 100 females, there were 93.5 males. For every 100 females age 18 and over, there were 87.8 males.

The median income for a household in the city was $46,723, and the median income for a family was $55,496. Males had a median income of $36,113 versus $25,230 for females. The per capita income for the city was $20,450. About 0.8% of families and 2.1% of the population were below the poverty line, including 1.4% of those under age 18 and 3.0% of those age 65 or over.

== Politics ==
Presidential election results

2020 Precinct Results Spreadsheet2016 Precinct Results Spreadsheet2012 Precinct Results Spreadsheet2008 Precinct Results Spreadsheet2004 Precinct Results Spreadsheet2000 Precinct Results Spreadsheet1996 Precinct Results1992 Precinct Results1988 Precinct Results1984 Precinct Results1980 Precinct Results1976 Precinct Results1968 Precinct Results1964 Precinct Results1960 Precinct Results
Year	Republican	Democratic	Third parties
2020	64.5% 1,898	32.8% 965	2.7% 79
2016	60.3% 1,629	30.9% 834	8.8% 238
2012	57.3% 1,481	40.0% 1,035	2.7% 71
2008	55.6% 1,427	41.4% 1,062	3.0% 77
2004	60.6% 1,534	37.8% 956	1.6% 41
2000	55.9% 1,225	36.9% 809	7.2% 157
1996	36.8% 753	47.3% 969	15.9% 326
1992	32.1% 713	35.7% 794	32.2% 715
1988	55.1% 1,129	44.9% 921	0.0% 0
1984	62.8% 1,294	37.2% 767	0.0% 0
1980	55.4% 1,197	34.9% 754	9.7% 209
1976	53.2% 1,071	44.1% 888	2.7% 56
1968	56.8% 1,026	39.5% 714	3.7% 66
1964	45.8% 742	54.1% 878	0.1% 1
1960	65.5% 1,026	34.4% 538	0.1% 1

== Climate ==
Month	Jan	Feb	Mar	Apr	May	Jun	July	Aug	Sep	Oct	Nov	Dec	Year
Average High°F	20	27	39	55	70	80	83	80	72	59	39	25	54
Average Low°F	1	8	21	34	47	57	62	59	48	36	22	8	34
Average Precipitation "	0.66	0.6	1.58	2.48	3.44	4.71	3.62	4.41	2.93	2.05	1.71	0.69	28.88

== Film ==
The town was the subject of the French film director Louis Malle's documentary God's Country, filmed in 1979 and 1985. Numerous townspeople were interviewed by Malle, including dairy farmer and banker Clayton Hoese and his sons.

== See also ==
- Glencoe Regional Health Services
