= List of county roads in Wright County, Minnesota =

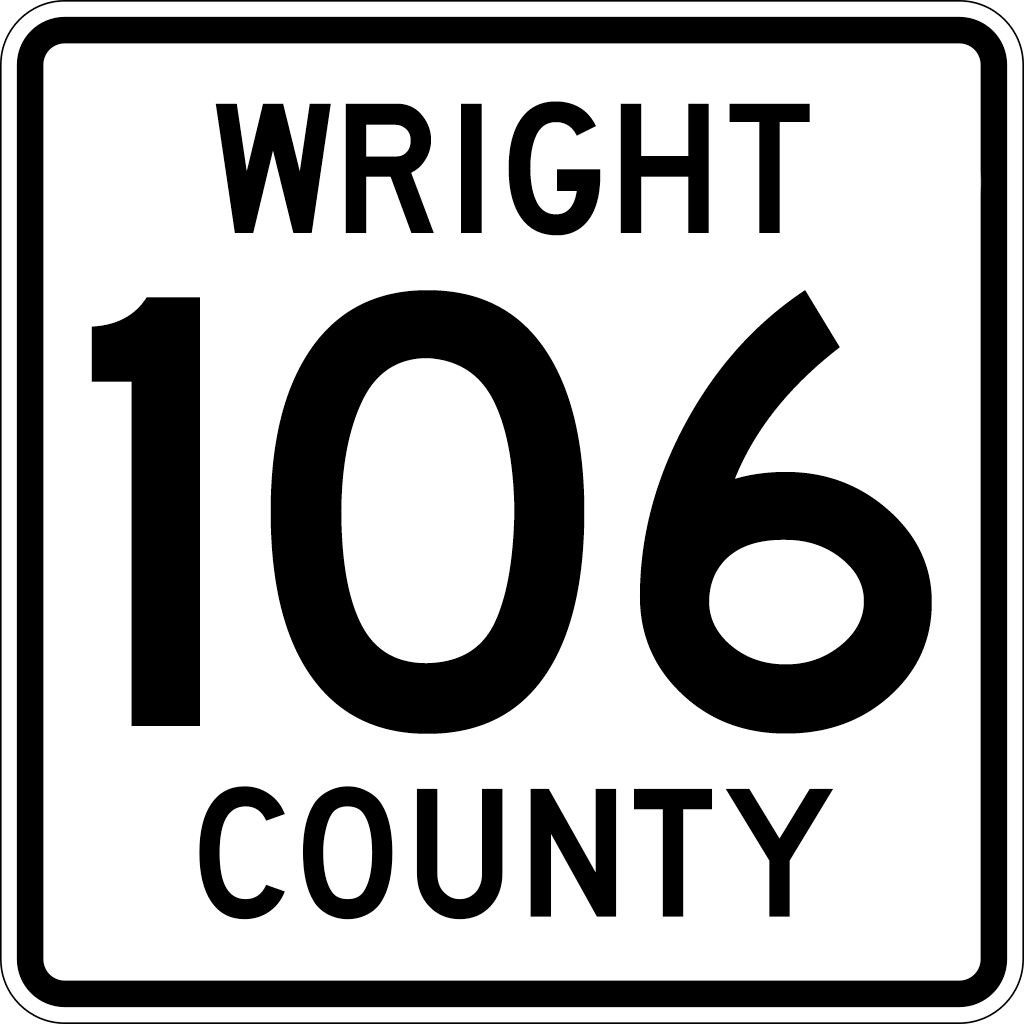
- Standard county road markers

Highway names
- Interstates: Interstate X (I-X)
- US Highways: U.S. Highway X (US X)
- State: Trunk Highway X (MN X or TH X)
- County State-Aid Highways: County State-Aid Highway X (CSAH X)
- County Roads: County Road X (CR X)

System links
- County roads of Minnesota; Wright County

The following is a list of county-maintained roads in Wright County, Minnesota, United States. The blue pentagon signed routes, and also routes with a number below 100, are county-state-aid-highways (CSAH.)

== Route List ==
Number	Length (mi)	Length (km)	Southern or western terminus	Northern or eastern terminus	Local names	Formed	Removed	Notes
CSAH 1	—	—	McLeod County line (County 16)	90th Street (County 30) in Stockholm Township	Quist AVE SW	—	—	Starts at Jet Ave in McLeod County and ends at T junction of 82nd Street SW and Co Rd 30
CSAH 2	—	—	County 35 in French Lake Township	Stearns county line (County 7)	Quinn Avenue; Willow Avenue; Custer Street; Fairhaven Avenue	—	—	
CSAH 3	—	—	McLeod County line (County 2)	Minnesota 55 in Southside Township	Broadway Avenue	—	—	
CSAH 4	—	—	US 12 in Cokato	County 35 in Cokato Township	Broadway Avenue	—	—	
CSAH 5	—	—	McLeod County line (County 31)	County 39, County 101 in Southside Township	Excelsior Avenue; Lake Drive	—	—	
CSAH 6	—	—	McLeod County line (County 21)	Minnesota 24 in Corinna Township	7th Avenue; 6th Street	—	—	
CSAH 7	—	—	US 12 in Howard Lake	Minnesota 24 in Clearwater Township	Illsley Avenue; 40th Street; Oak Avenue; Division Street; MN 55; Gowan Avenue; 175th Street	—	—	
CSAH 8	—	—	Carver County line (County 33)	County 75 in Silver Creek Township	Elder Avenue; Pacific Avenue; Division Street; Oak Avenue	—	—	
CSAH 9	—	—	County 8 in Waverly	County 8 in Maple Lake Township	Atlantic Avenue; Dempsey Avenue; Cushing Avenue; Colbert Avenue; Eldridge Avenue	—	—	
CSAH 10	—	—	Carver County line (County 21)	90th Street (County 30) in Woodland Township	Clementa Avenue	—	—	
CSAH 11	—	—	County 37 in Maple Lake Township	County 39 in Silver Creek Township	Clementa Avenue	—	—	
CSAH 12	—	—	US 12 in Montrose	County 37 in Maple Lake Township	Buffalo Avenue; Baker Avenue; Alladin Avenue; Montrose Boulevard; Lake Boulevard; Meridian Avenue	—	—	
CSAH 13	—	—	Carver County line (County 10)	80th Street (County 30) in Franklin Township	Calder Avenue	—	—	
CSAH 14	—	—	US 12 in Franklin Township	Minnesota 55 in Rockford Township	Dague Avenue	—	—	
CSAH 16	—	—	Carver County line (County 27)	Woodland Road (County 30) in Delano	West River Road	—	—	
CSAH 17	—	—	Carver County line (County 20)	Hennepin County line (County 50)	Fairhill Avenue; River Street; 65th Street	—	—	
CSAH 18	—	—	Broadway Street (County 39, County 75) in Monticello	Naber Avenue (County 22) in St. Michael	Fenning Avenue; Jason Avenue; 50th Street	—	—	
CSAH 19	—	—	Hennepin County line (County 19)	95th Street (County 39) in Otsego	Labeaux Avenue	—	—	
CSAH 20	—	—	Minnesota 55 in Rockford	Labeaux Avenue (County 19) in Hanover	Main Street; Jansen Avenue; River Road	—	—	
CSAH 21	—	—	Meeker County line (County 5)	County 1 in Stockholm Township	750th Avenue; 110th Street	—	—	
CSAH 22	—	—	Hennepin County line (County 116)	50th Street (County 18) in St. Michael	Naber Avenue	—	—	
CSAH 30	—	—	Meeker County line (County 29)	Hennepin County line (County 11)	90th Street; Quist Avenue; 80th Street; County 3; 95th Street; County 5; County 6; Woodland Road; US 12; River Street	—	—	
CSAH 31	—	—	Meeker County line (County 6)	US 12 in Cokato Township	60th Street	—	—	
CSAH 32	—	—	Minnesota 25 in Rockford Township	Minnesota 55 in Rockford Township	40th Street; Dague Avenue; 37th Street	—	—	Formerly known as CR 115
CSAH 33	—	—	Minnesota 55 in Rockford Township	Main Street (County 20) in Rockford	Hamlin Avenue; Elm Street	—	—	
CSAH 34	—	—	Minnesota 55 in Buffalo	Labeaux Avenue (County 19) in Hanover	10th Street; Beebe Lake Road	—	—	
CSAH 35	—	—	Meeker County line (County 21)	Minnesota 241 in St. Michael	Division Street; Cushing Avenue; Colbert Avenue; Lake Boulevard; Central Avenue; MN 55; Willems Way; 20th Street; Fenning Avenue; 30th Street; Kahl Avenue; Central Avenue; St. Michael Parkway	—	—	
CSAH 36	—	—	I-94 in St. Michael	River Road (County 42) in Otsego	45th Street; 53rd Street; Rawlings Avenue	—	—	
CSAH 37	—	—	Meeker County line (County 27)	River Road (County 42) in Otsego	County 2; MN 55; Oak Avenue; 65th Street; 61st Street; 60th Street; Oakwood Avenue; 70th Street	—	—	
CSAH 38	—	—	LaBeaux Avenue NE (County 19) in Otsego	River Road NE (County 42) in Otsego	70th Street	—	—	
CSAH 39	—	—	Montgomery Avenue (County 5) in Southside Township	Minnesota 101 in Otsego	90th Street; MN 24; County 8; Golf Course Road; Broadway Street; Riverview Drive; 95th Street; 90th Street	—	—	
CSAH 40	—	—	Stearns County line (County 46)	Minnesota 24 in Clearwater Township	160th Street	—	—	
CSAH 41	—	—	Minnesota 25 in Buffalo Township	Minnesota 25 in Buffalo Township	Lake Pulaski Drive; Bryant Avenue	—	—	
CSAH 42	—	—	Hennepin County line (County 12)	Sherburne County line (Old MN 201 in Elk River)	River Road; Parrish Avenue	—	—	
CSAH 44	—	—	Hamlin Avenue (County 33) in Rockford Township	Jansen Avenue (County 20) in Rockford Township	10th Street	—	—	
CSAH 57	—	—	County 8 in Maple Lake	Minnesota 55 in Maple Lake	Division Street	—	—	
CSAH 60	—	—	US 12 in Montrose	Buffalo Avenue (County 12) in Montrose	Center Avenue; 2nd Street	—	—	
CSAH 75	—	—	Stearns County line (County 75)	Fenning Avenue (County 18) in Monticello	Broadway Street	—	—	
CSAH 83	—	—	County 12 in Buffalo Township	Minnesota 25 in Buffalo Township	35th St NE	—	—	Formerly County Road 138
CR 100	—	—	US 12 in Cokato Township	County 3 in Cokato Township	Reardon Avenue; 40th Street; Rockwood Avenue; 20th Street	—	—	
CR 101	—	—	County 136 in Southside Township	Montgomery Avenue (County 5) in Southside Township	90th Street	—	—	
CR 104	—	—	Minnesota 24 in Clearwater Township	County 7 in Clearwater Township	160th Street	—	—	
CR 105	—	—	County 6 in Albion Township	County 7 in Albion Township	20th Street	—	—	
CR 106	—	—	County 39 in Silver Creek Township	Minnesota 25 in Monticello Township	Gowan Avenue; 85th Street; County 8; 90th Street; Dempsey Avenue; 80th Street	—	—	
CR 107	—	—	County 6 in Middleville Township	County 12 in Marysville Township	40th Street	—	—	
CR 108	—	—	County 9 in Marysville Township	County 12 in Marysville Township	10th Street; 8th Street	—	—	
CR 109	—	—	Division Street (County 35) in Chatham Township	Minnesota 55 in Maple Lake Township	Dempsey Avenue; County 9; Colbert Avenue; 40th Street	—	—	
CR 110	—	—	90th Street (County 30) in Woodland Township	US 12 in Montrose	Clementa Avenue	—	—	
CR 111	—	—	County 39 in Silver Creek Township	County 75 in Silver Creek Township	Clementa Avenue; 137th Street; Barton Avenue	—	—	
CR 112	—	—	Clementa Avenue (County 10) in Woodland Township	Minnesota 25 in Franklin Township	115th Street; Common Street	—	—	
CR 113	—	—	Meridian Avenue (County 12) in Buffalo Township	Edmonson Avenue (County 117) in Buffalo Township	50th Street	—	—	
CR 116	—	—	Minnesota 55 in Rockford Township	County 33 in Rockford Township	Eckert Avenue	—	—	
CR 117	—	—	10th Street (County 34) in Buffalo Township	Edmonson Avenue in Monticello	Edmonson Avenue	—	—	
CR 118	—	—	County 37 in Monticello Township	County 18 in Monticello	Fenning Avenue	—	—	
CR 119	—	—	St. Michael Parkway (County 35) in St. Michael	65th Street (County 37) in Monticello Township	45th Street; Ibarra Avenue; 56th Street; Halsey Avenue	—	—	
CR 120	—	—	10th Street (County 44) in Rockford Township	10th Street (County 34) in St. Michael	Hansack Avenue; 5th Street; Ibarra Avenue	—	—	
CR 123	—	—	County 7, County 39 in Corinna Township	County 39 in Silver Creek Township	Howe Avenue; 100th Street; 102nd Street; 105th Street; Gowan Avenue; 112th Street; Duffield Avenue; 110th Street; Douglas Avenue	—	—	
CR 124	—	—	County 8 in Chatham Township	Dempsey Avenue (County 9, County 109) in Chatham Township	15th Street	—	—	
CR 125	—	—	County 4 in Cokato Township	County 5 in Middleville Township	35th Street	—	—	
CR 128	—	—	Stearns County line (County 44)	Minnesota 24 in Clearwater Township	120th Street	—	—	
CR 129	—	—	County 3 in French Lake Township	County 3 in French Lake Township	Peloquin Avenue; 60th Street	—	—	
CR 131	—	—	Minnesota 25 in Monticello Township	Minnesota 25 in Monticello Township	Cameron Avenue	—	—	
CR 132	—	—	County 7 in Albion Township	County 8 in Chatham Township	25th Street; 28th Street	—	—	
CR 133	—	—	Carver County line	County 8 in Woodland Township	Elliot Avenue	—	—	
CR 134	—	—	Minnesota 55 in Buffalo	20th Street (County 35) in Buffalo	Calder Avenue	—	—	
CR 135	—	—	County 101 in Southside Township	Stearns County line	Nevens Avenue	—	—	
CR 136	—	—	Minnesota 55 in Southside Township	County 2 in Southside Township		—	—	
CR 138	—	—	Minnesota 55 in Maple Lake Township	County 12 in Buffalo Township	35th Street	—	—	
CR 139	—	—	US 12 in Delano	County 30 in Delano		—	—	
CR 141	—	—	Meeker County line	Rockwood Avenue (County 100) in Cokato Township	40th Street	—	—	
CR 142	—	—	Meeker County line	Rockwood Avenue (County 100) in Cokato Township	25th Street	—	—	
CR 143	—	—	112th Street (County 123) in Silver Creek Township	County 8 in Silver Creek Township	Elliot Avenue	—	—	
CR 145	—	—	Stearns County line	Minnesota 24 in Clearwater	179th Street	—	—	
CR 147	—	—	Minnesota 25 in Buffalo Township	Minnesota 55 in Buffalo	Bradshaw Avenue	—	—	
CR 148	—	—	35th Street (County 138) in Buffalo	Babcock Avenue in Buffalo Township	Babcock Avenue	—	—	
CR 153	—	—	US 12 in Cokato	US 12 in Cokato	Jackson Avenue; 3rd Street	—	—	
CR 183	—	—	County 5 in Annandale	County 3 in French Lake Township, French Lake Township	55th St NW; Nevens Avenue NW; 75th St NW	—	—	Formerly County Road 38
Former
