= List of county roads in Stearns County, Minnesota =

- Standard county road markers

Highway names
- Interstates: Interstate X (I-X)
- US Highways: U.S. Highway X (US X)
- State: Trunk Highway X (MN X or TH X)
- County State-Aid Highways: County State-Aid Highway X (CSAH X)
- County Roads: County Road X (CR X)

System links
- County roads of Minnesota; Stearns County

Stearns County, Minnesota has many county roads, some of which are county state aid-highways. The following is an incomplete list of county roads in Stearns County, Minnesota

== CR 1–CR 25 ==

County Road 1 is a road that runs along the west side of the Mississippi River. It begins at Benton County Road 3, on a bridge over the Mississippi River connecting Sauk Rapids and St. Cloud. It then continues northward through St. Cloud, Sartell, and several other cities before reaching its northern terminus where it continues into Morrison County as Morrison County Road 21. It is 17.337 miles long.

County Road 2 is a major route in Stearns County. It begins at Meeker County Road 2 at the Meeker County line. It goes through Cold Spring, St. Joseph, and St. Stephen. and then continues across the Mississippi River into Benton County as Benton County Road 2. It is 34.534 miles long.

County Road 3 is a route that begins near St. Joseph at the western end of the County Road 75 and County Road 2 concurrency. The route continues northward into Morrison County as Morrison County Road 24. It is 18.322 miles long.

County Road 4 is a route that starts near Saint Wendel at a 4 way stop with County Road 3 and County Road 155. It meets County Road 2. Then it meets County Road 133 in Five Points at a 4 way stop. Entering Sartell, the route has a roundabout at County Road 120. At County Road 134, there is a signal. Another signal is located at the intersection of 54th Ave North & Veterans Drive. More signalized intersections along Veterans Drive include Anderson Avenue, McLeland Road, 44th Avenue North, Highway 15, 33rd Avenue North, 25th Avenue North, 9th Avenue North.

County Road 5 is a short route that runs from County Road 1 to County Road 3. It runs through Saint Stephen where it meets County Road 2. Then soon after it meets County Road 132 and the route turns east to terminate shortly after.

County Road 6 is route that begins at MN 23 in Rockville. The routes goes around Pleasant Lake before meeting County Road 137. The two roads share a short concurrency. The route terminates at County Road 74 and County Road 122.

County Road 7 is a route that begins at the border between Saint Cloud and Saint Augusta at County Road 75. It runs south into Wright County, where it turns into Wright County Road 2. It is 13.03 miles long.

County Road 8 is route that starts in Rockville at County Road 82, meets MN 23, turns east in Marty at a 4 way stop with County Road 48 and County Road 148. The route intersects County Road 141 and goes past Pearl Lake. It terminates at MN 15.

County Road 9 begins at MN 238 in Krain Township, at the border between Stearns County and Morrison County. The route goes south to Eden Valley, where it ends at MN 22. It is 38.843 miles long.

County Road 10 is a route that starts outside of Roscoe with MN 23, enters the town of Roscoe, has a 4-Way Stop with County Road 12. It shares a concurrency with MN 238 through the city of Albany, although it is unmarked. Outside of Albany, the route turns east and terminates at County Road 17.

County Road 11 is a route that starts at County Road 17 east of St. Rosa. The route travels south around some curves and into the city of Freeport. In Freeport, County Road 11 intersects County Road 60 and 157 at a 4 way stop. The route also intersects I-94 which is the interstate's exit for the city of Freeport. The route intersects County Road 30 which travels to New Munich to the west. The route terminates at County Road 12 and 128.

County Road 12 is a route that begins in New Munich at MN 237 and County Road 30. For most of the route, it parallels the Sauk River. The route travels roughly south and southwest until it reaches County Road 14. Before it intersects County Road 14, the roadway intersects County Road 31 and County Road 176. At County Road 14, the roadway travels northeast and the north. As the roadway changes direction, the route has its first junction with County Road 177, and then meets County Road 11 and County Road 128. The route has its second junction with County Road 177, intersects County Road 113, and crosses the Sauk River before traveling southwest into Saint Martin. In Saint Martin, the route has two junctions with County Road 195, the first junction County Road 195 heads south and at the second junction, the route meets County Road 195 at a 4 way stop. In Saint Martin, the route is known as Maine Street. After Saint Martin, as the route travel west-southwest it intersects County Road 32 before it intersects County Road 10 and 250th Street at an All way stop. The route continues its west-southwest path until it intersects County Road 111. At County Road 111, the route continues due south and terminates at MN 23 and County Road 43.

County Road 13 is a route that starts in Belgrade with MN 55, slightly northwest of the Y intersection of MN 55 & US 71. The route travels north and intersects with County Roads 194, 197 and 199 before intersecting County Road 27 and heading east. The route eventually intersects US 71 and shares a brief concurrency into the town of Elrosa. County Road 13 again travels east through Elrosa and leaving the town altogether. It curves north and meets County Road 191. It curves back to the east and intersects County Road 175 before entering the town of Greenwald. In Greenwald, County Road 13 and MN 4 share a concurrency, northwest to Meire Grove. In Meire Grove, County Road 13 leaves MN 4, traveling east through Meire Grove. It curves north and intersect County Road 30 which travels to New Munich to the east. County Road 13 continues north into the town of Melrose. It intersects County Road 173 before hitting I-94 which is the interstate's exit for Melrose. Downtown, the route intersects County Road 65 and 186 at a 4 way stop. County Road 13 shares a brief concurrency with County Road 65 for 3 blocks. It again travels north which passes Melrose Lake and the town's school. County Road 13 intersects County Road 17 and the route terminates at the county line between Todd County and Stearns County.

County Road 14 is a route that begins at US 71 and County Road 199. The route heads east before it starts curving in a more southerly direction. The route intersects County Road 175 and County Road 129 which travels through Spring Hill. Shortly after Spring Hill, the route intersects MN 4. County Road 14 starts to curve in a more northerly direction soon after MN 4 and terminates at County Road 12.

County Road 15 is a short route that begins at County Road 19 and County Road 129. The roadway travels south, it intersects County Road 178 before the route terminates at the Kandyohi county line.

County Road 16 is a route begins at MN 4 and County Road 178. The route travels east while intersecting County Road 130 and 33 before it heads in a more northerly direction and terminates at County Road 10 in Roscoe. MN 23 is nearby.

County Road 17 is a route in northern Stearns County that runs from County 1 near Rice to the Todd County line, where it continues as Todd County Road 11. It is 38.436 miles long.

County Road 18 is a route that begins at MN 28 and proceeds south and curves east. At this curve, the route meets County Road 188, the route then curves back to the south while intersecting with County Road 183. As the route continues south, it intersects County Road 28. Raymond Lake is nearby. The route again travels east, intersecting with County Road 193, and curves back south. Soon after, the route enters the unincorporated town of Padua while intersecting with County Road 22 and County Road 192. Outside of Padua, it curves east while the route intersects with County Road 26. It curves back south and the route intersects with County Road 25. A little later County Road 18 intersects County Road 27 before curving into the city of Brooten. In Brooten, the route is known as Central Avenue North. It serves the downtown on the north side of Brooten, and as the downtown fades, the route meets MN 55. After MN 55, the route intersects County Road 56 (Roe Street) before leaving town. Outside of town, the roadway curves slightly southeast and returns to its southerly path. The route passes Union Cemetery and Tamarack State Wildlife Management Area. Tamarack Lake is also nearby. It intersects with County Road 19 before it terminates at County Road 198 at the Kandiyohi county line.

County Road 19 is a route that begins at the Pope county line where the roadway continues as County Road 6. In Stearns County, the route travels east and intersects County Road 18. The route begins to curve north as it intersects County Road 200. A concurrency between the two routes begins. The invisible concurrency is short as County Road 200 travels north and County Road 19 curves to the east. As the route approaches Belgrade, the roadway intersects with MN 55 in which the two routes share an invisible concurrency. The two routes intersect County Road 13, and US 71 at a Y-intersection. MN 55 & US 71 begin their concurrency together there. In Belgrade, the three routes are known as Well Street, intersect County Road 55 and County Road 197 at Washburn Avenue. Then it curves southeast, crossing the tracks, it curves northeast while US 71 travels to the northeast while MN 55 & County Road 19 travels southeast, and soon after County Road 19 travels to the east. Later, the route intersects County Road 196 before crossing the North Fork of the Crow River, and it curves north and back east. The roadway then intersects County Road 15 and County Road 129 before it terminates at MN 4 and County Road 130 just south of Lake Henry.

County Road 20 is a short route that begins at County Road 85 and Roseville Road, southwest of Paynesville. MN 23 is nearby. The route travels south and terminates at Meeker County Road 20 and the roadway continues as Kandiyohi County Road 39. The entire route is known as Tri-County Road.

County Road 21 is a route that begins at County Road 9, northeast of Eden Valley and near Eden Lake. The route travels east, curves north and travels back to the east again. Then it travels north, then northeast into the unincorporated community of Saint Nicholas. The route meets County Road 165 while traveling due north then curving to the northeast around School Lake. The route returns traveling north, east, and northeast until it terminates at County Road 2.

County Road 22 is a route that begins at the unincorporated community of Padua at County Road 18 and County Road 192. The route travels due east and terminates at US 71.

County Road 23 is a route that starts at the 4 way stop in Farming with County Road 41 and 42. The route travels south out of Farming. Then it starts traveling in an easterly direction, continuing parallel to the Sauk River. The route starts to proceed in a more southerly direction and intersects County Road 161 before entering the town of Richmond. The route intersects County Road 111 and travels east. It terminates at County Road 9 just after 4 blocks.

County Road 24 is a short route that begins at MN 28 and continues north to terminate at Todd county line. The roadway continues as Todd County Road 15.

County Road 25 is a short route that begins at County Road 18 and travels to the west. The roadway terminates at Pope county line and continues as Pope County Road 20.

== CR 26–CR 50 ==
County Road 26 is a route that travels south, passes the Behen Waterfowl Production Area, curves east and back south. It passes the Padua Waterfowl Production Area before intersecting with County Road 193. It curves southwest, bordering the Claude Waterfowl, curves west and back to the south. It also passes Dickhaus Waterfowl Production Area and Pekarek Waterfowl Production Area before intersecting County Road 192. Finally, it passes the Pheasants Forever Inc Waterfowl Production Area before terminating at County Road 18.

County Road 27 is a route the begins at County Road 13. The route travels west, crosses over an unnamed creek, and then it curves south. It crosses over the North Fork of the Crow River before curving west-northwest. The route curves back to the west before crossing the Sedan Brook. It passes the Sedan Brook Prairie Scientific and Natural Area, crosses another unnamed creek, and finally terminates at County Road 18.

County Road 28 is a route that begins at its intersection with US 71 & County Road 190. The route heads east, intersects with County Road 187 and crosses an unnamed creek before it curves to the southwest. The roadway travels south and crosses another unnamed creek before heading west. The route crosses over a third unnamed creek and later curves to the southwest before intersecting with County Road 188. A fourth unnamed is crossed by the roadway before heading west again and later terminates at County Road 18.

County Road 29 is a route that begins at US 71 and heads to the east before curving southeast, then traveling east and later heads south. The roadway intersects County Road 190 before heading east and terminating at MN 4 in Meire Grove.

County Road 30 is a route that begins at County Road 13 just east of Meire Grove. It curves around Black Oak Lake, intersects County Road 173, and enters New Munich from the west. In New Munich, it intersects with MN 237 and County Road 12. County Road 30 also intersects with County Road 11, and the route travels southeast. Along the way, it intersects with County Road 172 and 174 before coming to a T intersection with County Road 176. The route continues east and terminates at County Road 10.

County Road 31 is a route that begins at County Road 12 and County Road 176. The route heads west, crosses the Sauk River, passes the Greenwald Waterfowl Production Area and terminates at MN 4 and County Road 176, southwest of Greenwald.

County Road 32 is a route that begins at County Road 12 near its all way stop with County Road 10 and 250th St. County Road 32 travels west, and it intersects County Road 195. Later, it meets County Road 33 and crosses an unnamed creek. It intersects MN 4, northwest of Lake Henry, and later hits County Road 15 and County Road 129. The route crosses the North Fork of the Crow River, curves south and back west. Soon after that, it terminates at US 71, northeast of Belgrade.

County Road 33 begins at County Road 85 which is the former alignment of MN 23 that traveled through Paynesville before the bypass was completed. It travels northwest to the current alignment of MN 23 that bypasses Paynesville. The route travels north and intersects with County Road 16, and then terminates at County Road 32.

County Road 34 is a route that begins at MN 22, north of Eden Valley. The route heads west, curves north, and curves back west while it intersects County Road 162. Later, the route curves south and crosses the Paynesville subdivision of the Canadian Pacific Railway. After that, the route immediately turns to the northwest, paralleling the railroad. The route crosses over an unnamed creek before curving to the west, and curving southwest, west-northwest, northwest, north, and northwest once more. It gradually curves west as it enters Paynesville, and the route does head west when it terminates at County Road 66 (Lake Ave S).

County Road 35 is a route that begins at the Todd county line. The roadway continues as Todd County Road 47. The route travels northwest as it passes Big Birch Lake. As the route begins to travel due south, it intersects County Road 37. The route terminates at County Road 17, northeast of Saint Rosa.

County Road 36 is a route that begins at the Todd-Morrison county line. The roadway continues as Morrison County Road 19 to the north. Schreiers Lake is nearby. The route continues south and intersects County Road 37. After that, the roadway curves west-southwest until it terminates at County Road 17.

County Road 37 is a short route that begins at County Road 35 and continues due east. The route passes Marty Lake and borders a portion of the Lovell Lake Waterfowl Production Area. The roadway terminates at County Road 36 where Lovell Lake is nearby.

County Road 38 is a short route that begins at MN 238 in St Anthony and continues west to terminate at County Road 153 (Freeport St). The route is known as St Charles St and the entire route is in St Anthony.

County Road 39 is a route begins at County Road 11, northeast of Freeport. The route travels past the Hemker Park and Zoo. It also intersects County Road 153 and 172 before terminating at MN 238.

County Road 40 is a route that begins at County Road 10. The route terminates at County Road 9. It is 5.86 miles long.

County Road 41 is a route that begins at County Road 10 which is nearby I-94. The route heads southeast before heading due south and intersecting with County Road 156. The route begins to curve southwest before intersecting with County Road 40. It curves southeast and southwest before intersecting County Road 117. Again the route gets curvy and travels southwest and south before entering the town of Farming from the southeast. It terminates at the 4 way stop with County Road 23 and County Road 42.

County Road 42 is a route that begins at the 4 way stop in Farming with County Road 23 and County Road 41. The route travels east. It intersects County Road 161 before terminating at County Road 9.

County Road 43 is a route the begins at MN 23 and County Road 12 near Becker Lake and Kolling Creek. The heads south, then curves southeast and southwest around Becker Lake and Schroeder Lake before briefly traveling south. It curves southeast and southwest around Flint Lake, Ganzer Lake, and Deep Lake before heading directly southwest. The route curves back southeast before heading due south, and curves east as it intersects County Road 162, and later terminates at MN 22, north of Eden Valley.

County Road 44 is a route that begins at County Road 7 in St Augusta near Johnson Creek. It travels south, curves southwest, and travels southwest. The route gradually curves west-southwest before it parallels I-94. It meets County Road 143, and immediately travels due south. It intersects County Road 45 as it curves east and the route curves back south. It curves southwest as it crosses Plum Creek and travels between Feldges Lake and Long Lake. The route goes south again and meets County Road 145. Then the route crosses over an unnamed creek and County Ditch Number 10 twice before meeting County Road 46 and County Road 145. Later, the route curves to the west near Weigand Lake and it curves back south before hitting County Road 144. The route turns west, curves southwest and west-southwest before crossing the 3 Mile Creek, and returns to its westerly path near Otter Lake. Soon after, the route serves the Stearns Scout Camp before meeting County Road 7 in northern Fairhaven. The route share a concurrency and travel south until County Road 44 heads west and County Road 7 heads south. Fair Haven Park is nearby. Outside of Fairhaven, the route curves southwest, crosses an unnamed creek, briefly travels west, curves west-southwest, southwest and northeast before the route travels west again. The route enters Kimball and terminates at MN 24 & MN 55.

County Road 45 is a route that begins at County Road 44 in St Augusta. The route travels west, curves southwest and west-southwest before crossing the Plum. It continues back to its southwesterly path before it curves back south. The route gradually travels southwest and meets County Road 146 and crosses an unnamed creek along the way. Again, it heads back south, curves southwest and back south. The route meets County Road 145 and immediately travels southwest while it curves west-southwest. It continues to curve southwest and crosses the 3 Mile Creek. The route terminates at County Road 7 near Lake Laura.

County Road 46 is a route that begins at the Clearwater River and the Wright County line. The route travels west and terminates at County Road 44 and County Road 145.

County Road 47 is a route that begins at a signalized intersection with MN 15 and County Road 136 in St Augusta. It travels generally west. The route crosses an unnamed creek before meeting County Road 137. It then meets MN 23, curves northwest before traveling west again, and terminates at County Road 82 in Rockville.

County Road 48 is a route that begins at the 4 way stop in Marty. The route travels south out of Marty. As County Road 48 begins to head west, it intersects County Road 147. The route curves back south and terminates at MN 55 between Watkins and Kimball.

County Road 49 is a route that begins in Cold Spring at MN 23. The route travels around the Sauk River, Knaus Lake, and Bolfing Lake. The route continues southwest before intersecting County Road 71 and 163 at a 4 way stop. The route begins to travel west before terminating at MN 22.

County Road 50 is a route that begins outside of Avon at County Road 9. The route runs parallel to I-94 until it intersects County Road 159. The route then travels curves through a wooded area where it intersects County Road 51. The route continues to curves through the wooded where it intersects County Road 160. Soon after, the route travels through farmland and continues southeast into Cold Spring. In Cold Spring, the route is known as 5th Avenue North and it serves as the Roccori school district's west entrance and exit. The route terminates at a roundabout with County Road 2 just south of the school.

== CR 51-CR 74 ==
County Road 51 is a route that begins at County Road 50. It travels through a wooded area and intersects County Road 159 which serves the St. John's University campus area. The route passes Island Lake and Kraemer Lake before terminating at County Road 2. I-94 is nearby.

County Road 52

County Road 53

County Road 54 is a route that begins at the MN 238 and County Road 10 unmarked concurrency on the east side of Albany. It is known as Railroad Avenue in Albany. The route travels east and then south cutting through the Albany Golf Course and begins to parallel I-94 until the interstate starts to travel more south. The route travels more east and passes Lower Spunk Lake and Middle Spunk Lake before entering the city of Avon. In Avon, the route is known as 1st Street Northwest. It begins to curve south before terminating at County Road 9 (Avon Avenue North). Portions of the route were part of the original routing of US 52 from 1934 to 1956 until it was replaced by I-94.

County Road 55

County Road 56 is a short route in the city of Brooten. It begins at the Pope County line, traveling east. The route intersects County Road 18 (Central Avenue N) and shortly after it terminates at MN 55. The entire route is located in Brooten and is known as Roe Street.

County Road 57

County Road 58

County Road 59

County Road 60 is a route that begins in Freeport. The route terminates in Freeport.

County Road 61

County Road 62

County Road 63

County Road 64 is a brief route that connects County Road 65 to County Road 170 in Melrose. The route starts at County Road 65 (Riverside Avenue Northwest) & 3rd Avenue Northwest. The route continues northeast and then north, crossing the Sauk River. The route terminates at 6th Street Northwest and the roadway continues as County Road 170 (3rd Avenue Northwest).

County Road 65 is a route begins at interchange with I-94 and MN 4. The route crosses the Lake Wobegon Trail and then begins to parallel the trail and I-94 where it heads into the city of Melrose. In Melrose, the route is known as West Riverside Avenue. The route crosses the Sauk River. It intersects County Road 64 (3rd Avenue Northwest) and then travels along the south shores of Melrose Lake. It then travels south on North 2nd Avenue East until it meets County Road 13 and 186 at a 4 way stop. The route shares a brief concurrency with County Road 13. The route continues east through Melrose as East Main Street until it leaves Melrose. County Road 65 begins to parallel I-94 again through some farmland before it crosses the Sauk River for the second time. It intersects County Road 157 which continues east but the route travels southeast until it terminates at interchange with I-94 and MN 237. Portions of the route were part of the original routing of US 52 from 1934 to 1956 until it was replaced by I-94.

County Road 66 begins at MN 4 in the outskirts of Paynesville. The route is known as Lake Avenue South for its entire route. It travels north of the east side of Paynesville where it intersects County Road 34. A little farther north, the route terminates at a signalized intersection with County Road 85 (Business 23 East). The entire route was originally part of MN 4 back in 1933. During the 1940s, it was turned back to become MN 124 and it was later replaced by MN 4 sometime about 1960. Three years later, it again became MN 124 until it was decommissioned in 2003.

County Road 67 is a route that begins in Richmond at County Road 9 (Jay Avenue Northeast). The route travels east through Richmond as East Main Street until it reaches a T intersection. County Road 67 continues south to terminate at a signalized intersection with MN 23 and County Road 71.

County Road 68

County Road 69 is a route that begins at the intersection of MN 55 & County Road 196 near Georgeville. The route travels through Georgeville and terminates at the Kandyohi county line. The roadway continues as Kandyohi County Road 9. The route is unsigned the entire route.

County Road 70

County Road 71 is a route that begins at a signalized intersection with MN 23 and County Road 67 outside of Richmond. It terminates at a 4 way stop with County Road 49 and County Road 163.

County Road 72 is route that begins at the Todd County line where the roadway continues as Todd County Road 51. From the county line, the route travels southeast where it parallels I-94 for the majority of the route. The Lake Wobegon Trail also runs parallel to this for a portion of its route. Since I-94’s exit 124 was built, the route's only stop sign was placed so traffic coming from I-94 can safely commute to Sauk Centre. Drivers on eastbound County Road 72 have to turn left to continue on the route, but westbound drivers proceed straight to continue on County Road 72. It has a brief concurrency with County Road 79 between 2nd Street South and Sinclair Lewis Avenue. The route travels past the community's civic center and industrial park. The route curves, making the route continue east. It ends at a signalized intersection with US 71 & MN 28 and County Road 186. In Sauk Centre, the route is known as Beltline Road and 12th Street South.

County Road 73

County Road 74 is a route that begins at MN 15 south of Saint Cloud. The route terminates at a signalized intersection with County Road 122.

== CR 75–CR 100 ==
County Road 75 is a major road that goes through St. Joseph, St. Cloud, and St. Augusta. Its western terminus is at an interchange with I-94 and US-52. It runs east into Saint Cloud, in which it collides with MN-23 at an intersection with MN-15, and requires a short drive on MN-15 in order to connect with the rest of the county road. Afterwards, it runs into St. Augusta passing another interchange with I-94 / US-52. It then splits from County Road 7 it has a third interchange with I-94 / US-52 as Opportunity Drive, and continues towards Clearwater. Just short of Clearwater, County Road 75 enters Wright County as Wright County Road 75. It is 21.44 miles long.

County Road 76

County Road 77

County Road 78 is a short route that connects County Road 1 to County Road 133. It begins at a signalized intersection with County Road 1 and curves up a hill to terminates at a signalized intersection with County Road 133.

County Road 79 is a short route in Sauk Centre that connects County Road 17 (Fairy Lake Road & Sinclair Lewis Avenue) to County Road 184. The route begins at 2nd Street South and Minette Road. To the west, the roadway continues as County Road 184 out of Sauk Centre. The route travels east expect with its brief concurrency with County Road 72 (Beltline Road) that travels southwest. At Sinclair Lewis Avenue, the route travels east and terminates at Sinclair Lewis Avenue (to the east) and Fairy Lake Road (to the slight northwest). The route is known as 2nd Street South, Beltline Road, and Sinclair Lewis Avenue in the city of Sauk Centre.

County Road 80

County Road 81 is a route that begins at County Road 75 in Waite Park. The route terminates at MN 15 in Waite Park.

County Road 82 is a route that begins at MN 23 in southwest side of the city of Rockville. The route terminates at MN 23 in the northwest side of the city of Rockville.

County Road 83 is a route that begins at Fairway Drive near the Rich Spring Golf Club, the route passes Schendiers Lake is nearby. The route terminates at County Road 71 (formerly a 4 way stop).

County Road 84 is a route that begins at its interchange with MN 15 outside of St Cloud. The route terminates at a roundabout with County Road 74 in St Cloud.

County Road 85 is a route that begins at its interchange with MN 23 outside of Paynesville.

County Road 86

County Road 87

County Road 88

County Road 89

County Road 90

County Road 91

County Road 92

County Road 93

County Road 94

County Road 95

County Road 96

County Road 97

County Road 98

County Road 99

County Road 100

== CR 101 and up ==
County Road 101

County Road 102

County Road 103

County Road 104

County Road 105

County Road 106

County Road 107

County Road 108

County Road 109

County Road 110

County Road 111 is a short route that connects County Road 12 to Richmond. The route begins at County Road 12 and continues south and east before crossing the Sauk River. The route enters the town of Richmond where it terminates at County Road 23. It is shortly known as Main Street West.

County Road 112 is a short route that begins at its northern junction with US 71 and MN 28 outside of Sauk Centre. The roadway curves southeast and heads southeast and shortly after the roadway terminates at its southern junction with US 71 & MN 28 in Sauk Centre. A portion of the roadway parallels US 71 & MN 28.

County Road 113 is a short route that begins at County Road 12. The route terminates at County Road 177.

County Road 114 is a route that begins at MN 23 in Roscoe. The route terminates at County Road 10 in Roscoe.

County Road 115 is a route that begins at County Road 7 in St Augusta. The route terminates at County Road 136.

County Road 116

County Road 117 is a route that begins at County Road 40. It terminates at County Road 41.

County Road 118

County Road 119

County Road 120 is a route that begins at a roundabout with County Road 4 and it travels east as a 3 lane road with a turning lane in the middle of the roadway. It has a signalized intersection with Pine Cone Road before it becomes 4 lanes before its roundabout with County Road 134 and Leander Avenue. It continues at 4 lanes until it terminates at County Road 1. Before it terminates, it has a roundabout with Centracare Circle, meets MN 15 at a diverging diamond interchange (DDI), it meets the road that serves Sam's Club and Walmart at two roundabouts before it terminates at a roundabout with County Road 1.

County Road 121 is a route that begins in St. Joseph at a four way stop with County Road 134. The route travels past the College of St. Benedict before it curves to the east. It travels past the Kennedy Community School and curves southeast. County Road 121 terminates at County Road 138 shortly after. The route crosses over the Sauk River.

County Road 122 is a route that begins at County Road 6 and County Road 74 and travels east. The route terminates at County Road 136.

County Road 123 is a route that begins at 253rd Avenue, travels east, then bends north. The route merges with the MN-23.

County Road 124

County Road 125

County Road 126 is a short route that begins at County Road 170 and heads south to terminate at County Road 185.

County Road 127

County Road 128 is a route that begins at County Road 11 and County Road 12. The route heads south until it terminates at County Road 177.

County Road 129

County Road 130

County Road 131

County Road 132

County Road 133 is a route begins at County Road 134 in St. Joseph. Shortly after that, it travels north to its signalized intersection with County Road 75. The route travels northeast until it arrives in Five Points. In Five Points, County Road 133 meets County Road 4 (Veterans Drive) at a 4 way stop. The route continues east and from this point the route is known as 6th Street South. The route meets 19th Avenue at a roundabout in Sartell and the route continues east. County Road 133 meets Pine Cone Road and Heritage Drive at a roundabout, and the route travels north and becomes Pine Cone Road until it meets 2nd Street South at a roundabout. County Road 133 travels east and becomes 2nd Street South where it meets County Road 78 at a signal before the roadway continues as Benton County Road 29 over the Mississippi River.

County Road 134 is a route that begins at a 4 way stop with County Road 121 in St. Joseph. The route ends at a roundabout with County Road 120 in St Cloud.

County Road 135

County Road 136 is a route the begins at a roundabout with 33rd St S in Waite Park. The route ends at a signalized intersection with MN 15 and County Road 47.

County Road 137 is a route that begins at a signalized intersection with County Road 74, W St Germain St, and 22nd St S in Waite Park. The route terminates at County Road 47 in Rockville.

County Road 138 is a route that begins at County Road 82 in Rockville. The route terminates at a roundabout with 28th St S in Waite Park.

County Road 139 is a route that begins at County Road 2. The route terminates at County Road 82 in Rockville.

County Road 140 is a route that begins at its western junction with MN 23. It terminates at its eastern junction with MN 23 and County Road 82 near Rockville.

County Road 141

County Road 142

County Road 143

County Road 144 is a short route the begins at County Road 44. The route travels south, and curves southeast between Clearwater Lake and Grass Lake. The roadway continues as Wright County Road 128 over an unnamed creek.

County Road 145

County Road 146

County Road 147 is a route that begins at MN 15 in Maine Prairie. The route terminates at County Road 48.

County Road 148 is a route that begins at a 4 way stop with County Road 8 and 48 in Marty. The route terminates at 121st Ave and the roadway continues as County Road 165.

County Road 149

County Road 150

County Road 151 is a route that begins at County Road 9. The route terminates at County Road 52.

County Road 152 is a route that begins at County Road 17. The route terminates at County Road 10.

County Road 153 is a route that begins at County Road 17. The route terminates at County Road 39.

County Road 154 is a route that begins at County Road 10 near Albany. The route terminates at County Road 9 in St Anna.

County Road 155

County Road 156 is a route that begins at County Road 41 near Albany. A portion of the route parallels I-94. The route terminates at County Road 9.

County Road 157 is a route that begins at County Road 65 near Melrose. The route terminates at a 4 way stop with MN 238 and 8th St in Albany.

County Road 158 is a route that begins at MN 23 and County Road 83 between Richmond and Cold Spring. The route terminates at County Road 2 in Cold Spring.

County Road 159 (non-CSAH) begins at County Road 50 on the south side of I-94 and US-52. It proceeds east to an interchange and turns to the south and goes through Collegeville. The route then continues south to County Road 51.

County Road 160 is a route that begins at County Road 2. The route terminates at County Road 50.

County Road 161 is a route that begins at County Road 42 east of Farming. The route terminates at County Road 23 northwest of Richmond.

County Road 162

County Road 163

County Road 164

County Road 165

County Road 166 is a route that begins at County Road 17. The route terminates at County Road 11.

County Road 167 is a route that begins at 4 way stop with County Road 17 and 420th St in St Rosa. The route terminates at County Road 157 near Freeport.

County Road 168 is a route that begins at County Road 17. The route terminates at County Road 13 in Melrose.

County Road 169

County Road 170 is a route that begins at County Road 64 in Melrose. The route terminates at County Road 17.

County Road 171 is a route that begins at County Road 17.

County Road 172 is a route that has two segments. The southern segment begins at County Road 30. The northern segment begins at County Road 157. The northern segment terminates at County Road 39.

County Road 173 is a route that begins at County Road 13 in Melrose. The route terminates at County Road 30.

County Road 174

County Road 175

County Road 176 is a route that begins at County Road 12 and County Road 31. The route heads east, crosses the Gretchell Creek and intersects County Road 11. It continues east until it terminates at County Road 30.

County Road 177 is a route that begins at its western junction with County Road 12. The route terminates at County Road 10 and County Road 23.

County Road 178

County Road 179

County Road 180

County Road 181

County Road 182

County Road 183

County Road 184

County Road 185

County Road 186 is a route that begins at a signalized intersection with US 71 & MN 28 and County Road 72 in Sauk Centre and terminates at 4 way stop in Melrose.

County Road 187 is a route that begins at US 71

County Road 188

County Road 189

County Road 190 is a route that begins at US 71 and County Road 28.

County Road 191

County Road 192 is a route that begins at the Pope County line. The route heads to the east, intersects County Road 26 near the Dickhaus Waterfowl Production Area and the Pekarek Waterfowl Production Area. Continuing on its easterly path, it crosses an unnamed creek and Judicial Ditch Number 1 before terminating at County Road 18 and County Road 22 in Padua.

County Road 193

County Road 194 is a route that begins at MN 55. The route terminates at County Road 13.

County Road 195

County Road 196

County Road 197

County Road 198

County Road 199

County Road 200
