= Maple Lake =

Maple Lake can refer to a location in North America:

== Canada ==
- Maple Lake (Lunenburg), a lake of Chester Municipal District in Nova Scotia
- Maple Lake (Halifax, Nova Scotia), a lake in the Halifax Regional Municipality
- Maple Lake (Pictou), a lake of Pictou County, in Nova Scotia
- Maple Lake (Ontario), a lake in Haliburton County

== United States ==
- Maple Lake, Minnesota, a small city
- Maple Lake Township, Wright County, Minnesota
- Maple Lake (Douglas County, Minnesota), a lake
- Maple Lake (Polk County), Minnesota, a lake
- Maple Lake (Wright County, Minnesota), a lake
