= Oster, Minnesota =

Unincorporated community in Minnesota, US

Oster
- Unincorporated community
- Location within Minnesota Location within the United States
- Coordinates: 44°58′48″N 93°58′56″W
- Country: United States
- State: Minnesota
- Counties: Carver and Wright
- Township: Hollywood Township and Woodland Township
- Elevation: 994 ft (303 m)
- Time zone: UTC-6 (Central (CST))
  - Summer (DST): UTC-5 (CDT)
- ZIP code: 55390 and 55360
- Area codes: 763 and 952
- GNIS feature ID: 654864

Oster is an unincorporated community in Carver and Wright Counties, Minnesota, United States.

The community is located along County Road 133 (CR 133) near 118th Street SW. 16th Street is also in the immediate area. Nearby places include Waverly, Mayer, New Germany, Winsted, Montrose, and Watertown.

Oster is located within Hollywood Township in Carver County; and also located within Woodland Township in Wright County.
