= Rice Lake, Wright County, Minnesota =

Unincorporated community in Minnesota, United States

Rice Lake
- Unincorporated community
- Location within Minnesota Location within the United States
- Coordinates: 45°00′51″N 94°08′40″W
- Country: United States
- State: Minnesota
- County: Wright
- Township: Stockholm Township
- Elevation: 1,030 ft (310 m)
- Time zone: UTC-6 (Central (CST))
  - Summer (DST): UTC-5 (CDT)
- ZIP code: 55321 and 55349
- Area code: 320
- GNIS feature ID: 650022

Rice Lake is an unincorporated area (Lost town) in Stockholm Township, Wright County, Minnesota, United States. The community is located along Wright County Road 30 near Morrison Avenue SW.

Nearby places include Cokato, Howard Lake, Stockholm, Silver Lake, and Grass Lake–Stockholm Wildlife Management Area.

Wright County Roads 3 and 5 are also in the immediate area.

== History ==
Relatively isolated from any towns, the settlers in this area started a small creamery-town. Rice Lake. Located where present-day Morrison Avenue intersects with County Road 30, Rice Lake consisted of a creamery, a general store, a blacksmith's shop, a small church and a few houses. Similar creamery settlements were common throughout this countryside (Hollywood and Czestochowa, near Watertown, are two examples). (no subject) Life was laborious during Rice Lake's early days. Farmers would travel to Lake Ann, cut ice blocks from the lake with circular saws, and haul the ice back to the settlement for use in the creamery and the store. Some farmers also kept ice at home. Lake Ann was a long trek by horse, and cutting ice took a while, Mel Bjur said, so settlers could only make one trip a day.

Modernization forever changed Rice Lake. More automobiles and better roads made nearby towns (Cokato, Winsted, Howard Lake) more accessible - eliminating the need for the creamery-town. According to Bjur, the Rice Lake creamery fell in the late 1930s; the store went in the early 1950s. The Eielsen church, according to one document, closed in 1968. (Today, only one Eielsen church remains, Immanuel Lutheran near French Lake, Minn. The entire Eielsen Synod has only about 25 members.)

== Gallery ==
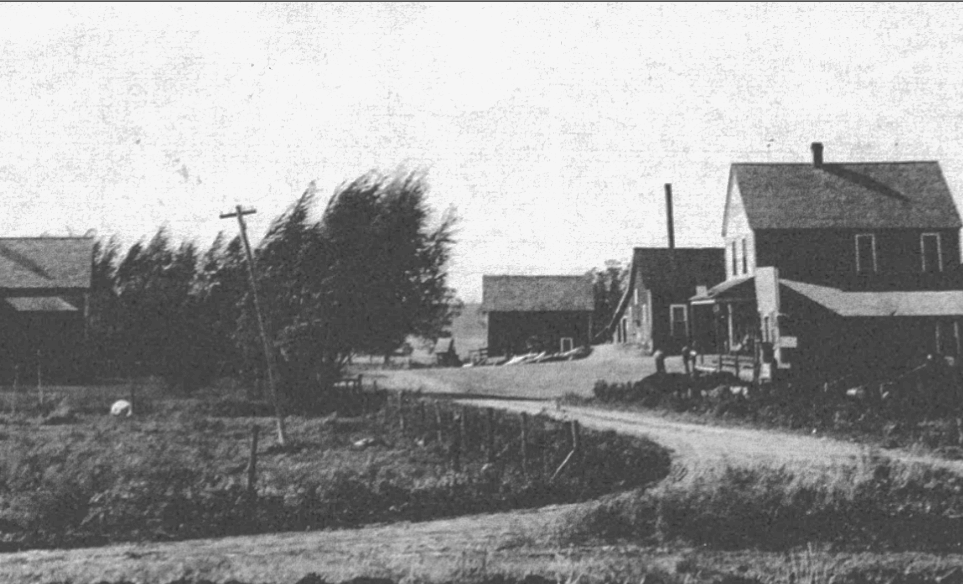
Rice Lake in 1910

Rice Lake Creamery, built July 1911.

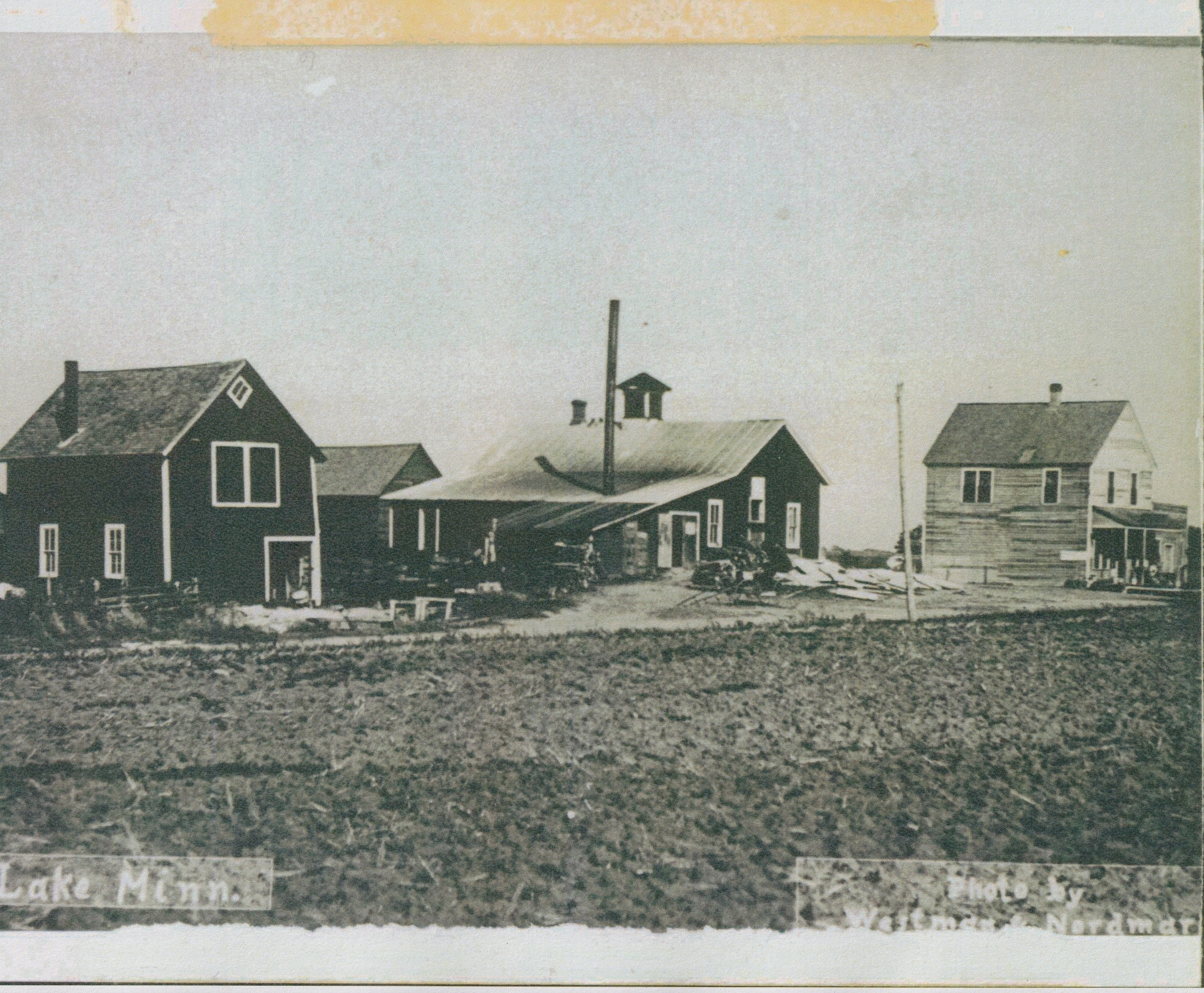

Rice Lake Original Creamery
