= Stockholm Township =

Stockholm Township may refer to:

- Stockholm Township, Crawford County, Iowa
- Stockholm Township, Minnesota
- Stockholm Township, Grant County, South Dakota, see Grant County, South Dakota
