= Belgrade-Brooten-Elrosa School District =

School district in Minnesota, United States

Location
- Belgrade, Stearns County, Pope County, Kandiyohi County, Minnesota; United States

District information
- Type: Public
- Grades: Preschool–12
- Accreditation: Blue Ribbon BBE Elementary School 2007.
- Schools: 2

Students and staff
- Students: 822
- Teachers: 49
- Student–teacher ratio: 1:15

Other information
- Website: https://www.bbejaguars.org/

The Belgrade-Brooten-Elrosa School District covers about 350 square miles (910 km^{2}) in the Stearns, Pope, and Kandiyohi counties in Minnesota. There are about 822 students enrolled in the district. The teacher to student ratio is 1:15. This school district covers the towns of Belgrade; Brooten; Elrosa; Greenwald; Regal; Padua; and Sedan.

== Elementary school ==
Located in Brooten, there are 325 students and 27 teachers. The teacher:student ratio is 1:14. The school earned the Blue Ribbon Award by the Department of Education in 2007.

=== Students per grade ===
In the Fall of 2019, we have about 150 students attending the JKC Preschool program on a daily basis in Brooten. Our Elementary classes range from 35-60 students per grade on an annual basis. Currently, our K-5 enrollment is about 325.

== High school ==
The 6-12 building is located in Belgrade. In the Fall of 2019, we are expecting just over 300 students and 22 teachers. The teacher:student ratio is 1:14.

== See also ==
- List of school districts in Minnesota
