= Rice Lake, Minnesota (disambiguation) =

Rice Lake, Minnesota may refer to:

- Rice Lake, Minnesota, a city in Saint Louis County
- Rice Lake (CDP), Minnesota, a census-designated place in Clearwater County
- Rice Lake (ghost town), Minnesota, a former village in Dodge and Steele counties
- Rice Lake, Wright County, Minnesota, an unincorporated community
