= Stockholm, Minnesota =

Unincorporated community in Minnesota, United States

Stockholm
- Unincorporated community
- Location within Minnesota Location within the United States
- Coordinates: 45°02′11″N 94°13′16″W
- Country: United States
- State: Minnesota
- County: Wright
- Township: Stockholm Township
- Elevation: 1,043 ft (318 m)
- Time zone: UTC-6 (Central (CST))
  - Summer (DST): UTC-5 (CDT)
- ZIP code: 55321
- Area code: 320
- GNIS feature ID: 652647

Stockholm is an unincorporated community in Stockholm Township, Wright County, Minnesota, United States. The community is located along Wright County Road 30 near Quinlar Avenue SW.

Nearby places include Cokato, Howard Lake, Silver Lake, Dassel, and Grass Lake–Stockholm Wildlife Management Area.

Wright County Road 3 is also in the immediate area.
