= County roads in Minnesota =

- Standard county road markers

Highway names
- Interstates: Interstate X (I-X)
- US Highways: U.S. Highway X (US X)
- State: Trunk Highway X (MN X or TH X)
- County State-Aid Highways: County State-Aid Highway X (CSAH X)
- County Roads: County Road X (CR X)

System links
- County roads of Minnesota

County roads in Minnesota are roads locally maintained by county highway departments in Minnesota. County roads span a wide variety of road types, varying from A-minor arterials that carry large volumes of traffic to gravel roads.

Most county roads in Minnesota are designated with numbers that are unique within each county. Although most counties designate with only numbers, a few in Dodge County use letters instead, and two in Isanti County use a combination of a number and letter.

== County Roads ==
County roads in Minnesota are marked with a general white square shield with black lettering and route number. Though route numbers are unique only within a county, due to historical reasons, some county routes maintain their number from one county to another, such is the case with County Road 1 in Chisago and Pine Counties (following a historical road named Kettle River Trail from the early part of Minnesota's history) or County Road 61 in Pine and Carlton Counties (following former U.S. Highway 61).

== County State Aid Highways ==
Some county routes are designated as County State Aid Highways (CSAH). These routes are constructed and maintained by counties, but they are eligible for funding from the County State Aid Highway Fund. Differences in signage between CSAH routes and other county roads depends on the county. Some counties, such as Stearns County, delineate between the two by using the "standard" M1-6 blue pentagon shield for CSAH designated routes and Minnesota's general white square shield for other county routes. The M1-6 blue pentagon shield's route number may be shown in either white or gold, depending on the county. In many counties, CSAH are given low route designation numbers and non-CSAH are given higher route designation numbers, but this is not a rule, for example, Hennepin County Road 26 is a non-CSAH, but other county roads in this series are CSAH.

== Inter-county Highways ==
A few roads that cross county borders are also signed with an "inter-county" designation and a letter, but this system is not shown on most maps. However, as these highways provide important alternate routes to the state highway system, the Minnesota Department of Transportation have recommended a local route numbering / labeling system that clearly identifies county routes that are continuous into neighboring counties. These routes, if marked, are marked with either a white square shield or a blue pentagon shield, with a blue square shield containing the route letter directly under shield with the route number. Like the M1-6 blue pentagon shield's route number, the inter-county route letter may be shown in either white or gold, depending on the county.

== Lists of county roads in Minnesota ==
- Aitkin County
- Anoka County
- Becker County
- Beltrami County
- Benton County
- Big Stone County
- Blue Earth County
- Brown County
- Carlton County
- Carver County
- Cass County
- Chippewa County
- Chisago County
- Clay County
- Clearwater County
- Cook County
- Cottonwood County
- Crow Wing County
- Dakota County
- Dodge County
- Douglas County
- Faribault County
- Fillmore County
- Freeborn County
- Goodhue County
- Grant County
- Hennepin County
- Houston County
- Hubbard County
- Isanti County
- Itasca County
- Jackson County
- Kanabec County
- Kandiyohi County
- Kittson County
- Koochiching County
- Lac qui Parle County
- Lake County
- Lake of the Woods County
- Le Sueur County
- Lincoln County
- Lyon County
- Mahnomen County
- Marshall County
- Martin County
- McLeod County
- Meeker County
- Mille Lacs County
- Minnehaha County
- Morrison County
- Mower County
- Murray County
- Nicollet County
- Nobles County
- Norman County
- Olmsted County
- Otter Tail County
- Pennington County
- Pine County
- Pipestone County
- Polk County
- Pope County
- Ramsey County
- Red Lake County
- Redwood County
- Renville County
- Rice County
- Rock County
- Roseau County
- Scott County
- Sherburne County
- Sibley County
- St. Louis County
- Stearns County
- Steele County
- Stevens County
- Swift County
- Todd County
- Traverse County
- Wabasha County
- Wadena County
- Waseca County
- Washington County
- Watonwan County
- Wilkin County
- Winona County
- Wright County
- Yellow Medicine County
- Inter-County highways
