= South Haven, Minnesota =

City in Minnesota, United States

South Haven
- City
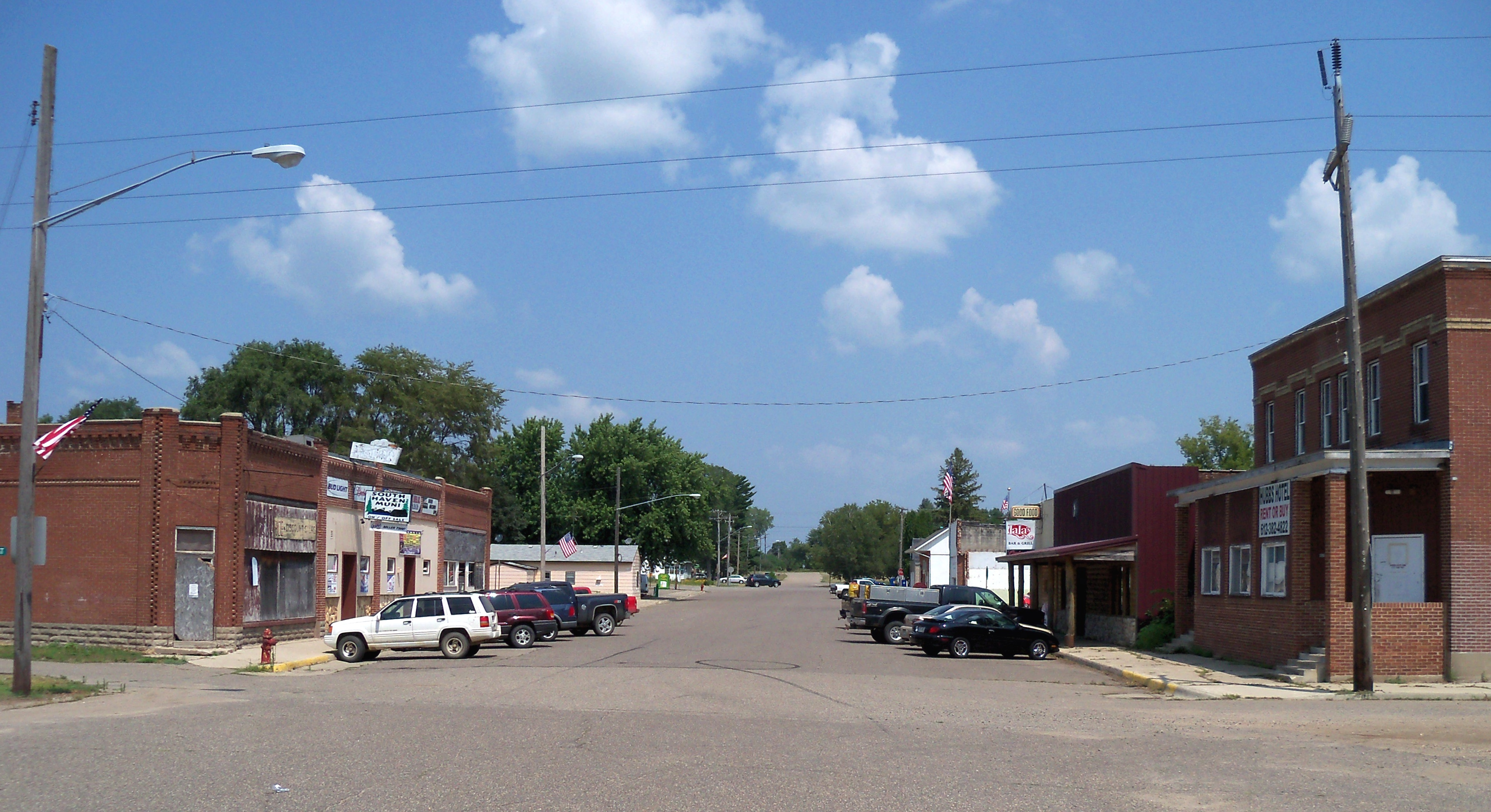
- Downtown South Haven

- Location of South Haven within Wright County, Minnesota
- Coordinates: 45°17′30″N 94°12′56″W
- Country: United States
- State: Minnesota
- County: Wright

Area
  - Total: 0.64 sq mi (1.65 km^{2})
  - Land: 0.64 sq mi (1.65 km^{2})
  - Water: 0 sq mi (0.00 km^{2})
- Elevation: 1,109 ft (338 m)

Population (2020)
  - Total: 185
  - Density: 291.2/sq mi (112.43/km^{2})
- Time zone: UTC-6 (Central (CST))
  - Summer (DST): UTC-5 (CDT)
- ZIP code: 55382
- Area code: 320
- FIPS code: 27-61402
- GNIS feature ID: 0652314

South Haven is a city in Wright County, Minnesota, United States. The population was 185 at the 2020 census.

== History ==
South Haven was platted in 1888 when the railroad was extended to that point. The city was so named for the fact it is located in Southside Township and due south of Fair Haven Township, Stearns County. A post office has been in operation at South Haven since 1887. South Haven was incorporated in 1902.

== Geography ==
According to the United States Census Bureau, the city has a total area of 0.63 square miles (1.63 km^{2}), all land. South Haven is located in the northwestern part of Wright County.

Minnesota State Highways 24 / 55 (co-signed) serve as a main route in the community. Nearby places include Annandale, Maple Lake, and Kimball.

== Demographics ==
Historical population
Census	Pop.	Note	%±
1910	287		—
1920	346		20.6%
1930	289		−16.5%
1940	276		−4.5%
1950	305		10.5%
1960	328		7.5%
1970	238		−27.4%
1980	205		−13.9%
1990	193		−5.9%
2000	204		5.7%
2010	187		−8.3%
2020	185		−1.1%
U.S. Decennial Census

=== 2010 census ===
As of the census of 2010, there were 187 people, 70 households, and 48 families living in the city. The population density was 296.8 inhabitants per square mile (114.6/km^{2}). There were 74 housing units at an average density of 117.5 per square mile (45.4/km^{2}). The racial makeup of the city was 93.6% White, 0.5% African American, 1.1% Native American, 0.5% Asian, 0.5% from other races, and 3.7% from two or more races. Hispanic or Latino of any race were 4.8% of the population.

There were 70 households, of which 41.4% had children under the age of 18 living with them, 58.6% were married couples living together, 5.7% had a female householder with no husband present, 4.3% had a male householder with no wife present, and 31.4% were non-families. 27.1% of all households were made up of individuals, and 11.4% had someone living alone who was 65 years of age or older. The average household size was 2.67 and the average family size was 3.33.

The median age in the city was 33.8 years. 33.7% of residents were under the age of 18; 4.9% were between the ages of 18 and 24; 23.6% were from 25 to 44; 23.4% were from 45 to 64; and 14.4% were 65 years of age or older. The gender makeup of the city was 51.9% male and 48.1% female.

=== 2000 census ===
As of the census of 2000, there were 204 people, 74 households, and 50 families living in the city. The population density was 322.7 inhabitants per square mile (124.6/km^{2}). There were 76 housing units at an average density of 120.2 per square mile (46.4/km^{2}). The racial makeup of the city was 98.53% White, 0.98% Native American, and 0.49% from two or more races. Hispanic or Latino of any race were 1.47% of the population.

There were 74 households, out of which 37.8% had children under the age of 18 living with them, 56.8% were married couples living together, 8.1% had a female householder with no husband present, and 31.1% were non-families. 25.7% of all households were made up of individuals, and 21.6% had someone living alone who was 65 years of age or older. The average household size was 2.76 and the average family size was 3.39.

In the city, the population was spread out, with 33.8% under the age of 18, 7.8% from 18 to 24, 25.5% from 25 to 44, 18.6% from 45 to 64, and 14.2% who were 65 years of age or older. The median age was 32 years. For every 100 females, there were 104.0 males. For every 100 females age 18 and over, there were 87.5 males.

The median income for a household in the city was $26,250, and the median income for a family was $34,063. Males had a median income of $31,250 versus $22,188 for females. The per capita income for the city was $12,751. About 4.3% of families and 12.1% of the population were below the poverty line, including 19.0% of those under the age of eighteen and 17.6% of those 65 or over.

== In the media ==
Element One made a progressive trance song called "South Haven" in 2009.
