= List of county roads in Lake of the Woods County, Minnesota =

Highway names
- Interstates: Interstate X (I-X)
- US Highways: U.S. Highway X (US X)
- State: Trunk Highway X (MN X or TH X)
- County State-Aid Highways: County State-Aid Highway X (CSAH X)
- County Roads: County Road X (CR X)

System links
- County roads of Minnesota; Lake of the Woods County

The following is a list of county-maintained roads in Lake of the Woods County, Minnesota, United States. Some of the routes included in this list are also county-state-aid-highways (CSAH.)

== Route list ==
Number	Length (mi)	Length (km)	Southern or western terminus	Northern or eastern terminus	Local names	Formed	Removed	Notes
CSAH 1	—	—	MN 72 in Unorganized Lake of the Woods County	MN 11 in Baudette		—	—	
CSAH 2	—	—	CSAH 3 in Unorganized Lake of the Woods County	Dead End in Unorganized Lake of the Woods County		—	—	
CSAH 3	—	—	CSAH 2 in Unorganized Lake of the Woods County	MN 11 in Unorganized Lake of the Woods County		—	—	
CSAH 4	—	—	CSAH 3 in Unorganized Lake of the Woods County	CSAH 20 in Unorganized Lake of the Woods County		—	—	
CSAH 5	—	—	CSAH 1 in Unorganized Lake of the Woods County	CSAH 1 in Unorganized Lake of the Woods County		—	—	
CSAH 6	—	—	CSAH 3 in Unorganized Lake of the Woods County	MN 172 in Unorganized Lake of the Woods County		—	—	
CSAH 7	—	—	CSAH 16 in Unorganized Lake of the Woods County	MN 72 in Unorganized Lake of the Woods County		—	—	
CSAH 8	—	—	CSAH 17 in Unorganized Lake of the Woods County	MN 172 in Unorganized Lake of the Woods County		—	—	
CSAH 9	—	—	CSAH 17 in Unorganized Lake of the Woods County	CSAH 2 in Unorganized Lake of the Woods County		—	—	
CSAH 11	—	—	CSAH 17 in Unorganized Lake of the Woods County	CSAH 2 in Unorganized Lake of the Woods County		—	—	
CSAH 12	—	—	CSAH 2 in Unorganized Lake of the Woods County	CSAH 8 in Unorganized Lake of the Woods County		—	—	
CSAH 13	—	—	CSAH 2 in Williams	MN 11 in Unorganized Lake of the Woods County		—	—	
CSAH 14	—	—	CSAH 3 in Unorganized Lake of the Woods County	CSAH 13 in Unorganized Lake of the Woods County		—	—	
CSAH 15	—	—	CSAH 14 in Unorganized Lake of the Woods County	CSAH 4 in Unorganized Lake of the Woods County		—	—	
CSAH 16	—	—	CSAH 1 in Unorganized Lake of the Woods County	CSAH 7 in Unorganized Lake of the Woods County		—	—	
CSAH 17	—	—	MN 11 in Roosevelt	Dead End in Unorganized Lake of the Woods County		—	—	
CSAH 18	—	—	Koochiching County line (County 18)	MN 11 in Unorganized Lake of the Woods County		—	—	
CSAH 19	—	—	MN 72 in Unorganized Lake of the Woods County	MN11 in Unorganized Lake of the Woods County		—	—	
CSAH 20	—	—	CSAH 8 in Unorganized Lake of the Woods County	Dead End in Unorganized Lake of the Woods County		—	—	
CSAH 22	—	—	CSAH 27 in Baudette	MN 11 in Baudette		—	—	
CSAH 26	—	—	MN 72 in Baudette	Dead End in Baudette		—	—	
CSAH 27	—	—	CSAH 1 in Baudette	CSAH 22 in Baudette		—	—	
CSAH 30	—	—	MN 172 in Unorganized Lake of the Woods County	Dead End in Unorganized Lake of the Woods County		—	—	
CSAH 31	—	—	MN 172 in Unorganized Lake of the Woods County	Dead End in Unorganized Lake of the Woods County		—	—	
CSAH 32	—	—	MN 172 in Unorganized Lake of the Woods County	Dead End in Unorganized Lake of the Woods County		—	—	
CSAH 33	—	—	MN 172 in Unorganized Lake of the Woods County	MN 172 in Unorganized Lake of the Woods County		—	—	
CSAH 34	—	—	CSAH 8 in Unorganized Lake of the Woods County	Zipple Bay State Park entrance in Unorganized Lake of the Woods County		—	—	
CSAH 35	—	—	CSAH 3 in Unorganized Lake of the Woods County	MN 11 in Unorganized Lake of the Woods County		—	—	
CSAH 39	—	—	MN 11 in Unorganized Lake of the Woods County	MN 172 in Unorganized Lake of the Woods County		—	—	
CSAH 49	—	—	PR 525 at the Canadian Border	Dead End in Unorganized Lake of the Woods County		—	—	Services the Northwest Angle.
CR 53	—	—	CSAH 2 in Unorganized Lake of the Woods County	66th Avenue Northwest in Unorganized Lake of the Woods County		—	—	
CR 58	—	—	CSAH 17 in Roosevelt	CR 61 in Unorganized Lake of the Woods County		—	—	
CR 61	—	—	MN 11 in Unorganized Lake of the Woods County	CR 58 in Unorganized Lake of the Woods County		—	—	
CR 67	—	—	CSAH 4 in Unorganized Lake of the Woods County	CR 68 in Unorganized Lake of the Woods County		—	—	
CR 68	—	—	CR 67 in Unorganized Lake of the Woods County	CSAH 3 in Unorganized Lake of the Woods County		—	—	
CR 69	—	—	CR 68 in Unorganized Lake of the Woods County	MN 11 in Unorganized Lake of the Woods County		—	—	
CR 73	—	—	CSAH 6 in Unorganized Lake of the Woods County	MN 172 in Unorganized Lake of the Woods County		—	—	
CR 75	—	—	MN 11 in Unorganized Lake of the Woods County	MN 172 in Unorganized Lake of the Woods County		—	—	
CR 77	—	—	MN 72 in Unorganized Lake of the Woods County	CSAH 1 in Unorganized Lake of the Woods County		—	—	
CR 97	—	—	CSAH 2 in Williams	CSAH 14 in Unorganized Lake of the Woods County		—	—	
CR 146	—	—	Pitt Grade Trail in Unorganized Lake of the Woods County	CSAH 1 in Unorganized Lake of the Woods County		—	—	
