= Maple Lake (Wright County, Minnesota) =

Lake in the state of Minnesota, United States

- Location within Minnesota
- Location: Wright County, Minnesota
- Coordinates: 45°14′5″N 93°57′41″W
- Type: lake

Maple Lake is a lake in Wright County, in the U.S. state of Minnesota.

Maple Lake was named for groves of sugar maple trees near its shores.

Maple Lake is located in Maple Lake township

== See also ==
- List of lakes in Minnesota
