= Woodland Township, Wright County, Minnesota =

Woodland Township, Minnesota
- Township
- Location within the state of Minnesota Woodland Township, Minnesota (the United States)
- Coordinates: 45°1′21″N 93°57′1″W
- Country: United States
- State: Minnesota
- County: Wright

Area
  - Total: 35.0 sq mi (90.6 km^{2})
  - Land: 34.2 sq mi (88.6 km^{2})
  - Water: 0.81 sq mi (2.1 km^{2})
- Elevation: 997 ft (304 m)

Population (2000)
  - Total: 1,137
  - Density: 33/sq mi (12.8/km^{2})
- Time zone: UTC-6 (Central (CST))
  - Summer (DST): UTC-5 (CDT)
- FIPS code: 27-71554
- GNIS feature ID: 0666043
- Website: https://woodlandtownship.com/

Woodland Township is a township in Wright County, Minnesota, United States. The population was 1,137 at the 2000 census.

Woodland Township was organized in 1858, and named for the original tracts of woodlands within its borders.

== Geography ==
According to the United States Census Bureau, the township has a total area of 35.0 square miles (90.6 km^{2}), of which 34.2 square miles (88.6 km^{2}) is land and 0.8 square mile (2.0 km^{2}) (2.26%) is water.

The southern portion of the city of Montrose is located within Woodland Township geographically but is a separate entity.

Woodland Township is located in Township 118 North of the Arkansas Base Line and Range 26 West of the 5th Principal Meridian.

== Demographics ==
As of the census of 2000, there were 1,137 people, 389 households, and 322 families residing in the township. The population density was 33.2 inhabitants per square mile (12.8/km^{2}). There were 398 housing units at an average density of 11.6/sq mi (4.5/km^{2}). The racial makeup of the township was 98.94% White, 0.18% Asian, and 0.88% from two or more races. Hispanic or Latino of any race were 0.09% of the population.

There were 389 households, out of which 36.5% had children under the age of 18 living with them, 73.5% were married couples living together, 4.6% had a female householder with no husband present, and 17.0% were non-families. 13.9% of all households were made up of individuals, and 5.4% had someone living alone who was 65 years of age or older. The average household size was 2.89 and the average family size was 3.19.

In the township the population was spread out, with 27.7% under the age of 18, 7.8% from 18 to 24, 28.7% from 25 to 44, 26.5% from 45 to 64, and 9.3% who were 65 years of age or older. The median age was 37 years. For every 100 females, there were 111.7 males. For every 100 females age 18 and over, there were 113.5 males.

The median income for a household in the township was $58,646, and the median income for a family was $63,281. Males had a median income of $38,846 versus $27,875 for females. The per capita income for the township was $21,813. About 3.4% of families and 4.5% of the population were below the poverty line, including 7.3% of those under age 18 and 8.3% of those age 65 or over.
