= Southside Township, Wright County, Minnesota =

Southside Township, Minnesota
- Township
- Location within the state of Minnesota Southside Township, Minnesota (the United States)
- Coordinates: 45°17′N 94°12′W
- Country: United States
- State: Minnesota
- County: Wright

Area
  - Total: 28.4 sq mi (73.5 km^{2})
  - Land: 24.3 sq mi (63.0 km^{2})
  - Water: 4.1 sq mi (10.5 km^{2})
- Elevation: 1,073 ft (327 m)

Population (2000)
  - Total: 1,576
  - Density: 65/sq mi (25/km^{2})
- Time zone: UTC-6 (Central (CST))
  - Summer (DST): UTC-5 (CDT)
- FIPS code: 27-61510
- GNIS feature ID: 0665656
- Website: https://www.southsidetownship.com/

Southside Township is in Wright County, Minnesota, United States. The population was 1,576 at the 2000 census.

Southside Township was organized in 1868.

== Geography ==
According to the United States Census Bureau, the township has a total area of 28.4 square miles (73.5 km^{2}), of which 24.3 square miles (63.0 km^{2}) is land and 4.1 square miles (10.5 km^{2}) (14.31%) is water.

The city of South Haven is located within Southside Township geographically but is a separate entity.

Southside Township is located in Township 121 North of the Arkansas Base Line and Range 28 West of the 5th Principal Meridian.

== Demographics ==
As of the census of 2000, there were 1,576 people, 592 households, and 448 families residing in the township. The population density was 64.8 inhabitants per square mile (25.0/km^{2}). There were 1,155 housing units at an average density of 47.5 per square mile (18.3/km^{2}). The racial makeup of the township was 99.37% White, 0.13% African American, 0.06% Native American, 0.13% Asian, 0.06% Pacific Islander, 0.13% from other races, and 0.13% from two or more races. Hispanic or Latino of any race were 1.14% of the population.

There were 592 households, out of which 32.4% had children under the age of 18 living with them, 69.1% were married couples living together, 3.7% had a female householder with no husband present, and 24.2% were non-families. 19.1% of all households were made up of individuals, and 6.8% had someone living alone who was 65 years of age or older. The average household size was 2.66 and the average family size was 3.06.

In the township the population was spread out, with 26.8% under the age of 18, 5.4% from 18 to 24, 28.2% from 25 to 44, 25.8% from 45 to 64, and 13.8% who were 65 years of age or older. The median age was 40 years. For every 100 females, there were 108.5 males. For every 100 females age 18 and over, there were 110.4 males.

The median income for a household in the township was $51,875, and the median income for a family was $60,375. Males had a median income of $44,276 versus $26,938 for females. The per capita income for the township was $23,607. About 3.2% of families and 4.7% of the population were below the poverty line, including 5.1% of those under age 18 and 4.0% of those age 65 or over.
