= Rockford Township, Wright County, Minnesota =

Rockford Township, Minnesota
- Township
- Location within the state of Minnesota Rockford Township, Minnesota (the United States)
- Coordinates: 45°7′N 93°47′W
- Country: United States
- State: Minnesota
- County: Wright

Area
  - Total: 36.8 sq mi (95.3 km^{2})
  - Land: 34.7 sq mi (89.9 km^{2})
  - Water: 2.1 sq mi (5.4 km^{2})
- Elevation: 938 ft (286 m)

Population (2000)
  - Total: 3,444
  - Density: 99/sq mi (38.3/km^{2})
- Time zone: UTC-6 (Central (CST))
  - Summer (DST): UTC-5 (CDT)
- ZIP code: 55373
- Area code: 763
- FIPS code: 27-55024
- GNIS feature ID: 0665436
- Website: https://www.rockfordtownship.com/

Rockford Township is a township in Wright County, Minnesota, United States. The population was 3,444 at the 2000 census.

Rockford Township was organized in 1858, and named after its largest settlement, Rockford.

== Geography ==
According to the United States Census Bureau, the township has a total area of 36.8 square miles (95.3 km^{2}), of which 34.7 square miles (90.0 km^{2}) is land and 2.1 square miles (5.4 km^{2}) (5.65%) is water.

Rockford Township is located in Township 119 North of the Arkansas Base Line and Range 25 West of the 5th Principal Meridian.

== Demographics ==
As of the census of 2000, there were 3,444 people, 1,138 households, and 961 families residing in the township. The population density was 99.2 inhabitants per square mile (38.3/km^{2}). There were 1,159 housing units at an average density of 33.4 per square mile (12.9/km^{2}). The racial makeup of the township was 97.13% White, 0.41% African American, 0.29% Native American, 0.49% Asian, 0.64% from other races, and 1.05% from two or more races. Hispanic or Latino of any race were 1.60% of the population.

There were 1,138 households, out of which 39.8% had children under the age of 18 living with them, 76.3% were married couples living together, 5.5% had a female householder with no husband present, and 15.5% were non-families. 11.0% of all households were made up of individuals, and 3.1% had someone living alone who was 65 years of age or older. The average household size was 3.01 and the average family size was 3.26.

In the township the population was spread out, with 28.5% under the age of 18, 7.8% from 18 to 24, 28.6% from 25 to 44, 28.9% from 45 to 64, and 6.3% who were 65 years of age or older. The median age was 38 years. For every 100 females, there were 103.7 males. For every 100 females age 18 and over, there were 103.5 males.

The median income for a household in the township was $67,708, and the median income for a family was $72,700. Males had a median income of $42,250 versus $31,087 for females. The per capita income for the township was $30,536. About 0.8% of families and 1.9% of the population were below the poverty line, including none of those under age 18 and 2.3% of those age 65 or over.
