= Buffalo Township, Wright County, Minnesota =

Buffalo Township, Minnesota
- Township
- Location within the state of Minnesota Buffalo Township, Minnesota (the United States)
- Coordinates: 45°11′29″N 93°49′47″W
- Country: United States
- State: Minnesota
- County: Wright

Area
  - Total: 29.3 sq mi (75.8 km^{2})
  - Land: 26.3 sq mi (68.0 km^{2})
  - Water: 3.0 sq mi (7.8 km^{2})
- Elevation: 1,030 ft (314 m)

Population (2020)
  - Total: 1,883
- Time zone: UTC-6 (Central (CST))
  - Summer (DST): UTC-5 (CDT)
- ZIP code: 55313
- Area code: 763
- FIPS code: 27-08470
- GNIS feature ID: 0663696

Buffalo Township is a township in Wright County, Minnesota, United States. The population was 1,883 at the 2020 census.

== History ==
Buffalo Township was organized in 1858, and named after Buffalo Lake.

== Geography ==
According to the United States Census Bureau, the township has a total area of 29.3 square miles (76 km^{2}), of which 26.2 square miles (68 km^{2}) is land and 3.0 square miles (7.8 km^{2}) (10.35%) is water.

== Demographics ==
As of the census of 2000, there were 1,938 people, 622 households, and 539 families residing in the township. The population density was 73.9 inhabitants per square mile (28.5/km^{2}). There were 638 housing units at an average density of 24.3 per square mile (9.4/km^{2}). The racial makeup of the township was 98.56% White, 0.62% Asian, 0.41% from other races, and 0.41% from two or more races. Hispanic or Latino of any race were 0.52% of the population.

There were 622 households, out of which 46.6% had children under the age of 18 living with them, 78.8% were married couples living together, 5.1% had a female householder with no husband present, and 13.2% were non-families. 10.9% of all households were made up of individuals, and 3.1% had someone living alone who was 65 years of age or older. The average household size was 3.11 and the average family size was 3.35.

In the township the population was spread out, with 32.5% under the age of 18, 6.7% from 18 to 24, 30.1% from 25 to 44, 24.1% from 45 to 64, and 6.6% who were 65 years of age or older. The median age was 36 years. For every 100 females, there were 104.4 males. For every 100 females age 18 and over, there were 102.6 males.

The median income for a household in the township was $59,531, and the median income for a family was $62,434. Males had a median income of $41,424 versus $26,944 for females. The per capita income for the township was $21,972. About 0.6% of families and 1.9% of the population were below the poverty line, including 1.8% of those under age 18 and none of those age 65 or over.
