= Padua, Minnesota =

Padua
- Unincorporated community
- Location within Minnesota Location within the United States
- Coordinates: 45°36′51″N 95°03′25″W
- Country: United States
- State: Minnesota
- County: Stearns
- Township: Raymond Township
- Elevation: 1,352 ft (412 m)

Population (2022)
  - Total: 11
- Time zone: UTC-6 (Central (CST))
  - Summer (DST): UTC-5 (CDT)
- ZIP code: 56316 and 56378
- Area code: 320
- GNIS feature ID: 649110

Padua is an unincorporated community in Raymond Township, Stearns County, Minnesota, United States, near Sauk Centre and Brooten. The community is located near the junction of Stearns County Roads 18, 22, and 192.
