= All-way stop =

Road intersection with stop signs on all approaches

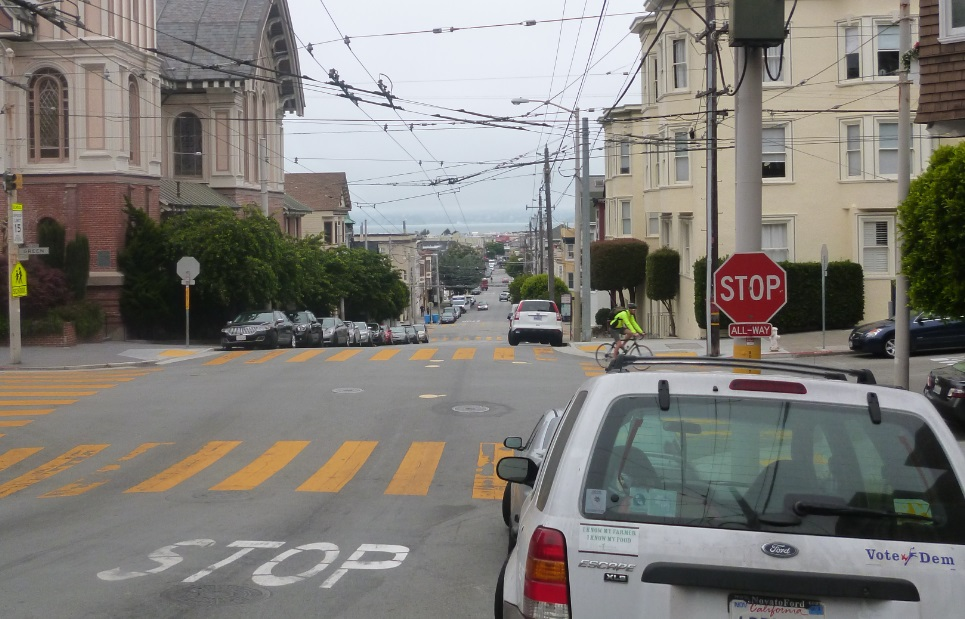
A 4-way stop in San Francisco

An all-way stop (also known as a four-way stop, three-way stop, six-way stop, etc. as appropriate) is a traffic management system which requires vehicles on all the approaches to a road intersection to stop at the intersection before proceeding through it. Designed for use at low traffic-volume locations, the arrangement is common in the United States, Canada, Mexico, South Africa, and Liberia, as well as in a number of, usually rural, locations in Australia where visibility on the junction approaches is particularly poor. The stop signs at such intersections may be supplemented with additional plates stating the number of approaches.

== Operation ==
In most jurisdictions of the United States and Canada, the rules of the all-way stop are the same. A motorist approaching an all-way stop must come to a full stop behind the crosswalk or stop line. Pedestrians always have the priority to cross the road, even if the crosswalk is not marked with surface markings.

- If a driver arrives at the intersection and no other vehicles are present, then they can proceed.
- If, on approach of the intersection, there are one or more cars already there, the driver must let them proceed first.
- Should a vehicle be behind one of those proceeding cars, the driver who was there first will proceed before that vehicle.
- If two drivers arrives at the same time, the vehicle on the right has the right-of-way.
- If two vehicles arrive opposite each other at the same time, and no vehicles are on the right, then they may proceed at the same time if they are going straight ahead. If one vehicle is turning and one is going straight, the right-of-way goes to the car going straight.
- If two vehicles arrive opposite each other at the same time and one is turning right and one is turning left, the right-of-way goes to the vehicle turning right. Since both are trying to turn into the same road, priority should be given to the vehicle turning right, as it is closer to the lane.

Driving instructors suggest that communication is always vital—including the use of turn signals to indicate planned turns. Often, vehicles can make compatible moves simultaneously without following the order listed above. If it is not clear who has the right-of-way, drivers should use good judgement until they clear the intersection. Within some U.S. jurisdictions, such as the state of Idaho, bicyclists are exempt from the need to make a complete stop, but must give way to other vehicles as otherwise required by law.

In Australia, drivers must give way to other drivers on their right side after coming to a stop.

== Application ==
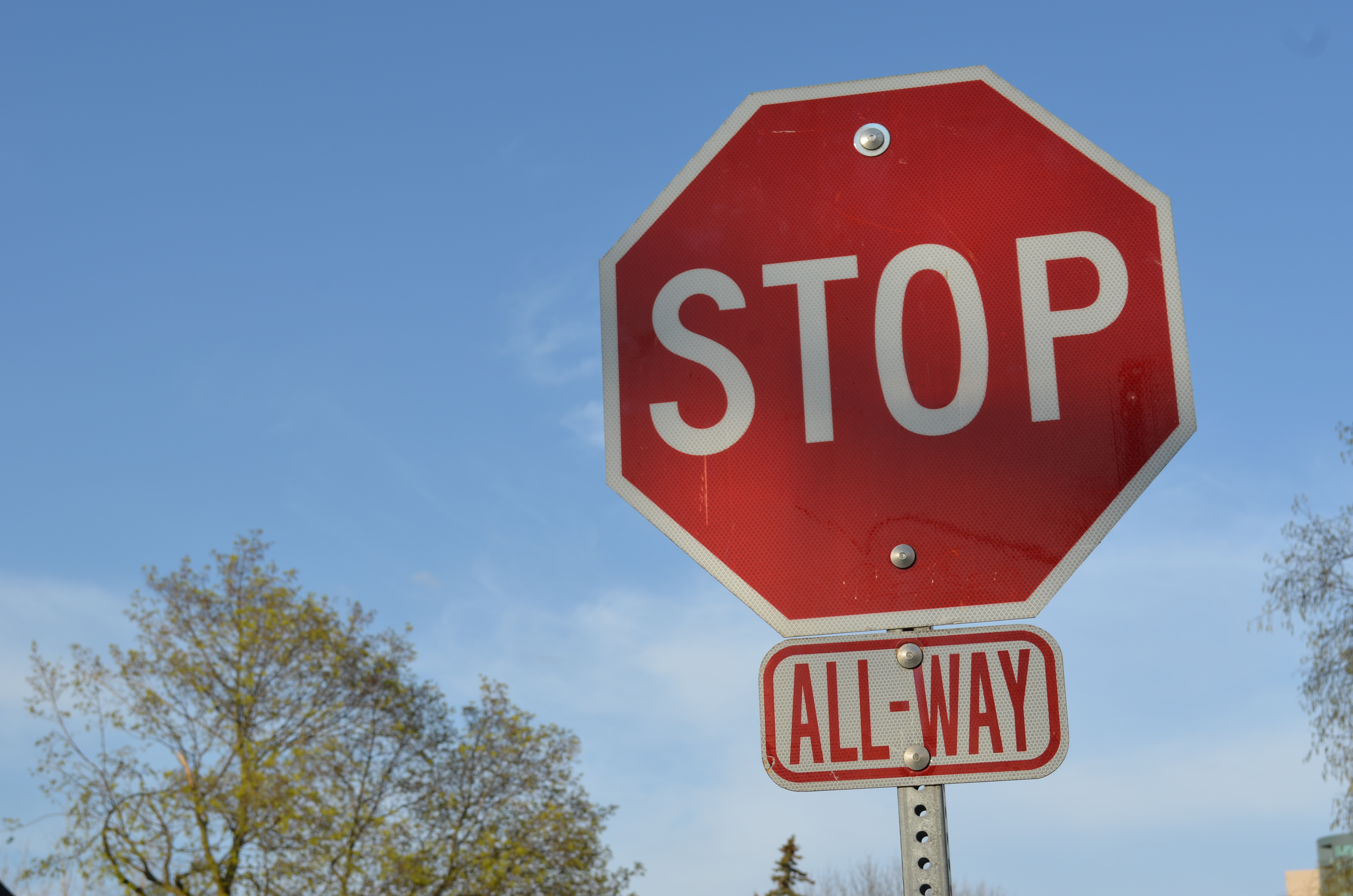
All roads leading into an all-way stop have an octagonal "stop" sign with an additional plate indicating that they are an all-way stop junction

In the United States, the Federal Highway Administration's Manual on Uniform Traffic Control Devices (MUTCD) defines the standards commonly used for the application of all-way stops. Where a stop has been determined to qualify, it is signed at all approaches to the intersections with a standard octagonal "Stop" sign, with a supplemental "All-Way" plate. Earlier editions of the MUTCD allowed supplemental plates specifying the number of approaches in an all-way stop, as in "2-Way", "3-Way" or "4-Way". According to the MUTCD, installation of an all-way stop should be based on a traffic engineering study to determine if minimum traffic volume or safety criteria are met. These intersections are often found where roads have light-volume traffic which does not justify a traffic light.

An all-way stop may also be justified if the intersection has shown a history of collisions involving pedestrians or vehicles. All-way stops may also be used as an interim measure preceding the placement of a traffic light, to provide a low-speed area for pedestrians to cross, where a cross street experiences considerable difficulty finding safe gaps due to heavy traffic volumes, or where traffic is frequently delayed by turning conflicts. Additionally, the MUTCD advocates the placement of all-way stops at intersections between through roads in residential areas if an engineering study can show that traffic flow would be improved by installing it. Despite published guidelines, all-way stops are routinely placed by jurisdictions due to political pressure from adjacent residents. Intersections between two minor highways with similar traffic counts, two collector roads in an urban or suburban setting or a collector road and a local road in a busy setting (such as near a school) are the most common locations for an all-way stop.

Traffic signals will sometimes flash red indications in all directions following a malfunction, or all-red flashing operation may be scheduled to reduce delay or handle construction activity or unusual traffic patterns. When a traffic signal flashes in all-red mode, it legally operates as an all-way stop. When all approaches to an intersection are controlled in this way the rules for an all-way stop apply. Traffic signals may also flash yellow to major directions and flash red to minor directions during off-peak times to minimize traffic delays, in which case only side-street traffic is required to stop and yield the right of way to crossing traffic on the major street.

During electrical outages when a traffic signal does not display any indications including flashing red, some jurisdictions require that the intersection be treated as an all-way stop. Other jurisdictions treat a dark signal as an uncontrolled intersection, where standard rules of right-of-way apply without the requirement of a complete stop.

== Benefits and disadvantages ==
The main reason for the use of stop signs at road junctions is safety. According to an international study of locations where the system is in use, all-way stop control applied to four-legged intersections may reduce accident occurrence by 45%. However, given alternative methods of intersection control and some of the disadvantages of all-way stops, the Handbook of Road Safety Measures recommends that four-way stops are best used between minor roads away from urbanized areas. Another benefit of all-way stops is assurance that vehicles enter the intersection at a low speed and have more time to take heed of the traffic situation, especially useful when sight distance is highly restricted.

Some of the disadvantages associated with all-way stops are:

- Increased emissions of hydrocarbons.
- Increased average delay.
- Increased wear on vehicle brakes
- Discouraging bicycling.
- That once installed, stop signs in general are unsafe to remove; accidents that result in injury may increase by 40%. Once an all-way stop is installed, removal is difficult and risky, as habitual drivers may continue to expect an all-way stop condition.
- According to game-theoretical analysis, drivers may have stronger incentives to run the stop sign if they believe drivers in other directions will stop at their respective signs.

== Worldwide comparisons ==
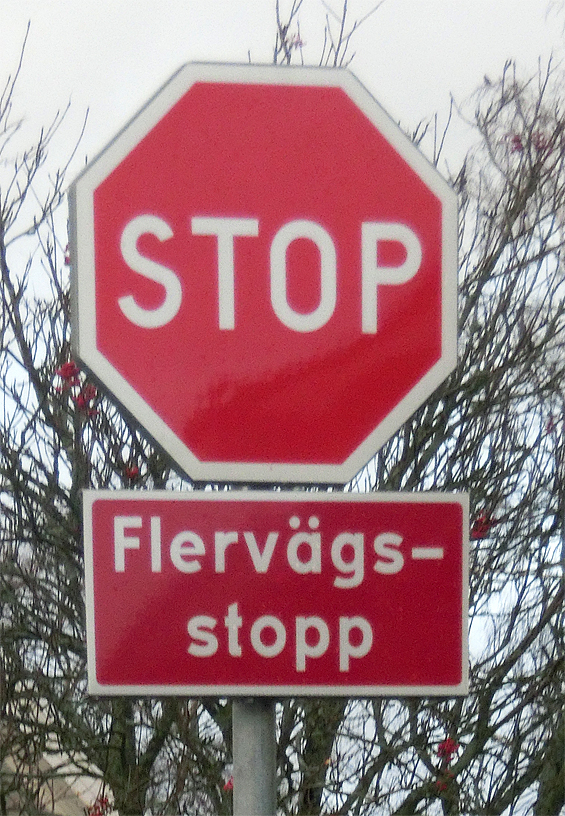
An all-way stop in Sweden

Few countries outside North America – least of all, those in Europe – have intersections at which all users must stop at all times; the conditions for stop sign placement may indeed preclude such an arrangement in many places. In Sweden all-way stops (Flervägsstopp) have been tested since the 1980s but are little used even though they are now permitted. In the UK they have always been very uncommon and were formally prohibited by the Department for Transport in 2002.

Four-way stops are common in the Southern African Development Community area, with priority going to the first vehicle to arrive and stop at the line.

The United Arab Emirates also has four-way stops.

At four-legged intersections within Europe, a roundabout or mini-roundabout may be used to assign a relative priority to each approach. (Roundabouts remain rare in North America, where early failures of rotaries and traffic circles caused such designs to lose favor until the gradual introduction of the modern roundabout in the late 20th century.) Alternatively, at smaller intersections, priority to the right is widely used in most countries.

== See also ==
- Pedestrian scramble, where all directions are red, allowing diagonal pedestrian crossing
