= Maple Lake Township, Wright County, Minnesota =

Maple Lake Township, Minnesota
- Township
- Location within the state of Minnesota Maple Lake Township, Minnesota (the United States)
- Coordinates: 45°13′50″N 93°56′25″W
- Country: United States
- State: Minnesota
- County: Wright

Area
  - Total: 34.6 sq mi (89.7 km^{2})
  - Land: 31.8 sq mi (82.3 km^{2})
  - Water: 2.9 sq mi (7.5 km^{2})
- Elevation: 1,007 ft (307 m)

Population (2000)
  - Total: 2,128
  - Density: 67/sq mi (25.9/km^{2})
- Time zone: UTC-6 (Central (CST))
  - Summer (DST): UTC-5 (CDT)
- ZIP code: 55358
- Area code: 320
- FIPS code: 27-40238
- GNIS feature ID: 0664903
- Website: https://maplelaketownship.com/

Maple Lake Township is a township in Wright County, Minnesota, United States. The population was 2,128 at the 2000 census.

Maple Lake Township was organized in 1858, and named after Maple Lake.

== Geography ==
According to the United States Census Bureau, the township has a total area of 34.7 square miles (89.7 km^{2}), of which 31.8 square miles (82.3 km^{2}) is land and 2.9 square miles (7.5 km^{2}) (8.31%) is water.

== Demographics ==
As of the census of 2000, there were 2,128 people, 744 households, and 604 families residing in the township. The population density was 67.0 inhabitants per square mile (25.9/km^{2}). There were 891 housing units at an average density of 28.0 per square mile (10.8/km^{2}). The racial makeup of the township was 98.68% White, 0.05% African American, 0.33% Native American, 0.38% Asian, 0.19% from other races, and 0.38% from two or more races. Hispanic or Latino of any race were 0.47% of the population.

There were 744 households, out of which 37.9% had children under the age of 18 living with them, 75.1% were married couples living together, 3.1% had a female householder with no husband present, and 18.7% were non-families. 14.8% of all households were made up of individuals, and 5.6% had someone living alone who was 65 years of age or older. The average household size was 2.86 and the average family size was 3.19.

In the township the population was spread out, with 28.6% under the age of 18, 6.3% from 18 to 24, 29.2% from 25 to 44, 26.2% from 45 to 64, and 9.6% who were 65 years of age or older. The median age was 38 years. For every 100 females, there were 108.2 males. For every 100 females age 18 and over, there were 107.5 males.

The median income for a household in the township was $60,208, and the median income for a family was $63,500. Males had a median income of $42,986 versus $27,500 for females. The per capita income for the township was $23,773. About 2.5% of families and 4.2% of the population were below the poverty line, including 3.9% of those under age 18 and 5.3% of those age 65 or over.
