= Brooten, Minnesota =

City in Minnesota, United States

- City
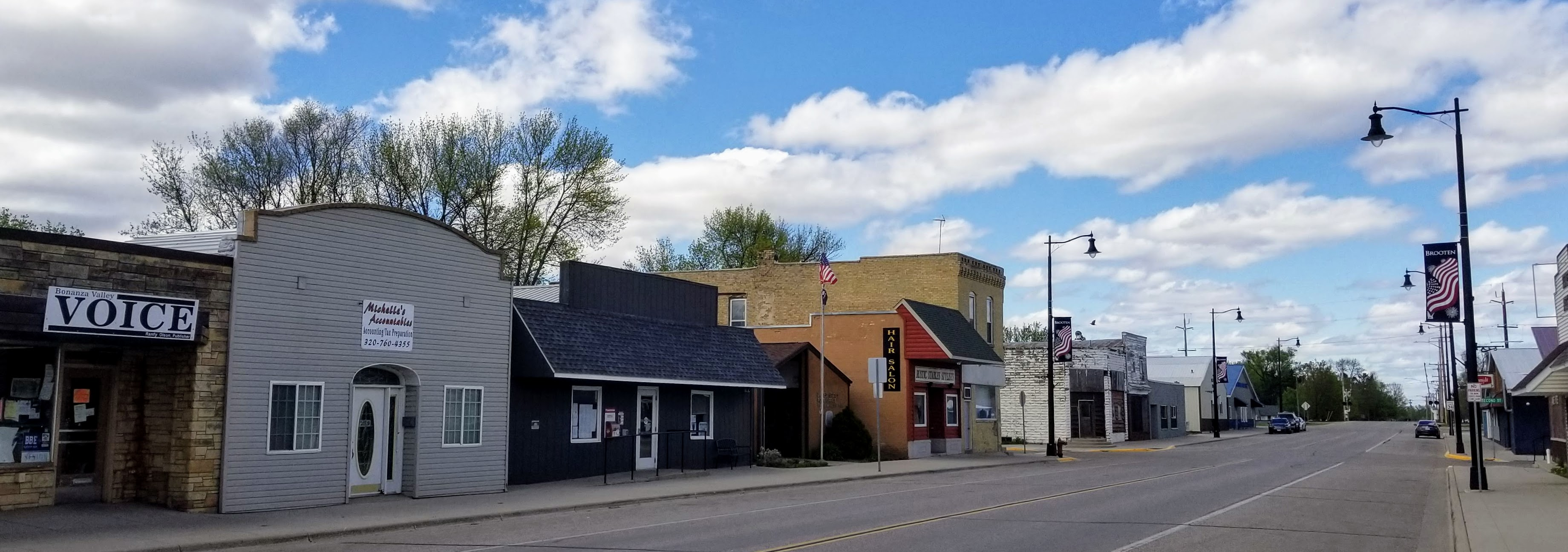
- Businesses on Brooten's Central Avenue
- Motto: "Heart Of The Bonanza Valley"
- Location of Brooten within Stearns and Pope Counties in the state of Minnesota
- Coordinates: 45°30′02″N 95°07′26″W
- Country: United States
- State: Minnesota
- Counties: Stearns, Pope
- Laid out: 1886
- Incorporated: February 16, 1892

Government
  - Mayor: Thor B. Amundson

Area
  - Total: 1.587 sq mi (4.111 km^{2})
  - Land: 1.587 sq mi (4.111 km^{2})
  - Water: 0 sq mi (0.000 km^{2})
- Elevation: 1,302 ft (397 m)

Population (2020)
  - Total: 626
  - Estimate (2022): 641
  - Density: 394.4/sq mi (152.27/km^{2})
- Time zone: UTC–6 (Central (CST))
  - Summer (DST): UTC–5 (CDT)
- ZIP Code: 56316
- Area code: 320
- FIPS code: 27-08092
- GNIS feature ID: 2393435
- Sales tax: 7.125%
- Website: brooten.govoffice.com

Brooten is a city in Stearns and Pope counties in the U.S. state of Minnesota, United States. The population was 626 as of the 2020 census. Almost the entire city is within Stearns County, with a small portion in Pope County.

The Stearns County portion of Brooten is part of the St. Cloud metropolitan area.

== History ==
Brooten was laid out in 1886, when the Soo Railroad was extended to that point. The city was named after the LiaBraaten family of settlers. A post office has been in operation at Brooten since 1886.

== Geography ==
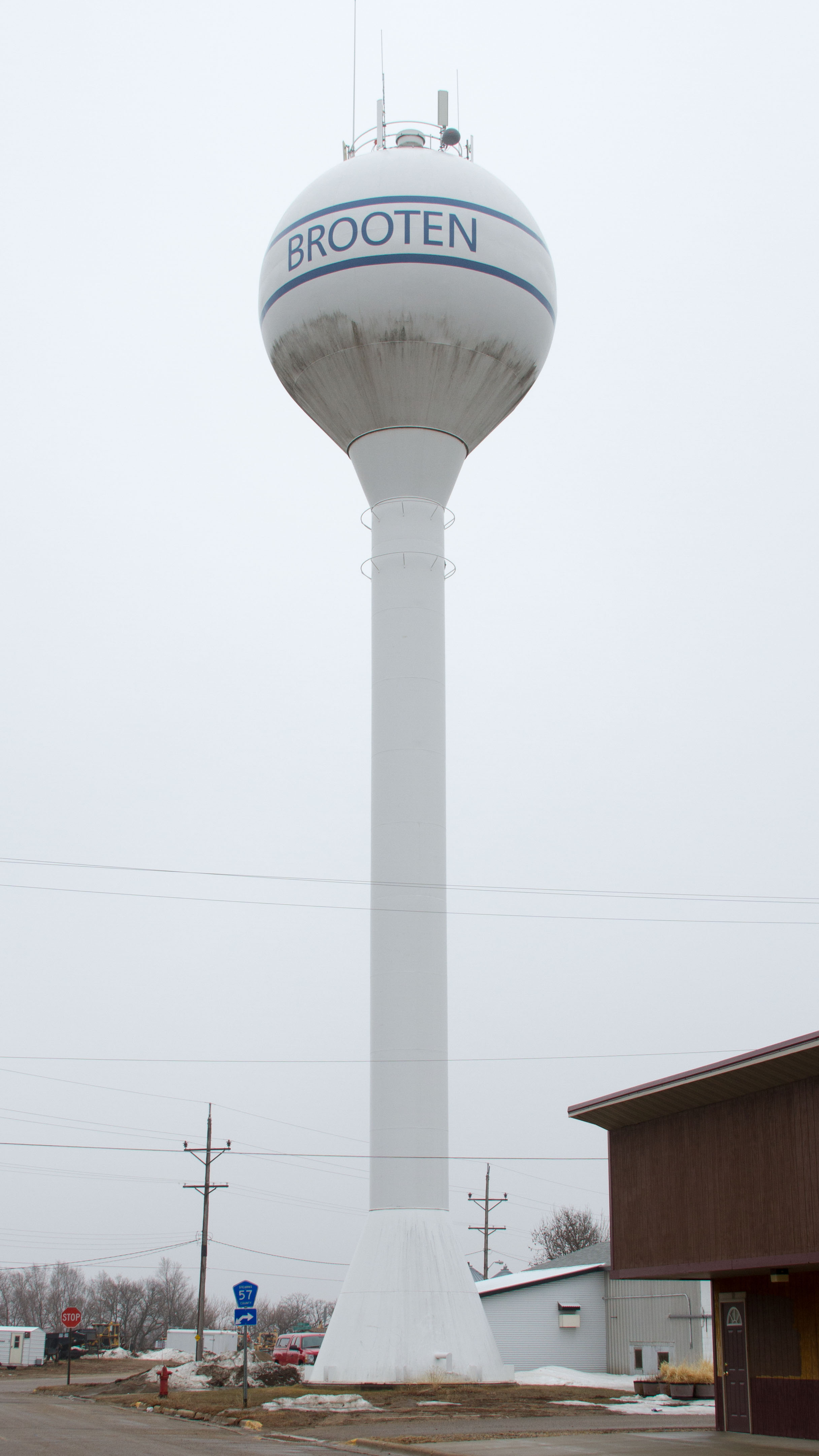
Brooten water tower

According to the United States Census Bureau, the city has a total area of 1.587 square miles (4.11 km^{2}), all land.

== Demographics ==
Historical population
Census	Pop.	Note	%±
1900	259		—
1910	562		117.0%
1920	649		15.5%
1930	604		−6.9%
1940	676		11.9%
1950	669		−1.0%
1960	661		−1.2%
1970	615		−7.0%
1980	647		5.2%
1990	589		−9.0%
2000	649		10.2%
2010	743		14.5%
2020	626		−15.7%
2022 (est.)	641		2.4%
U.S. Decennial Census; 2020 Census

=== 2010 census ===
As of the 2010 census, there were 743 people, 294 households, and 167 families living in the city. The population density was 473.2 inhabitants per square mile (182.7/km^{2}). There were 320 housing units at an average density of 203.8 per square mile (78.7/km^{2}). The racial makeup of the city was 98.7% White, 0.3% African American, 0.1% Native American, 0.1% Asian, 0.3% from other races, and 0.5% from two or more races. Hispanic or Latino of any race were 2.6% of the population.

There were 294 households, of which 27.6% had children under the age of 18 living with them, 41.8% were married couples living together, 10.5% had a female householder with no husband present, 4.4% had a male householder with no wife present, and 43.2% were non-families. 38.4% of all households were made up of individuals, and 22.1% had someone living alone who was 65 years of age or older. The average household size was 2.28 and the average family size was 3.00.

The median age in the city was 43.9 years. 22.9% of residents were under the age of 18; 6.8% were between the ages of 18 and 24; 22% were from 25 to 44; 20.5% were from 45 to 64; and 27.7% were 65 years of age or older. The gender makeup of the city was 49.3% male and 50.7% female.

=== 2000 census ===
As of the 2000 census, there were 649 people, 278 households, and 167 families living in the city. The population density was 446.7 inhabitants per square mile (172.5/km^{2}). There were 338 housing units at an average density of 232.7 per square mile (89.8/km^{2}). The racial makeup of the city was 99.38% White, 0.15% Native American, 0.15% Pacific Islander, 0.15% from other races, and 0.15% from two or more races. Hispanic or Latino of any race were 2.93% of the population.

There were 278 households, out of which 30.6% had children under the age of 18 living with them, 51.8% were married couples living together, 5.4% had a female householder with no husband present, and 39.6% were non-families. 34.5% of all households were made up of individuals, and 20.5% had someone living alone who was 65 years of age or older. The average household size was 2.33 and the average family size was 3.03.

In the city, the population was spread out, with 27.7% under the age of 18, 5.2% from 18 to 24, 24.3% from 25 to 44, 21.0% from 45 to 64, and 21.7% who were 65 years of age or older. The median age was 39 years. For every 100 females, there were 89.2 males. For every 100 females age 18 and over, there were 87.6 males.

The median income for a household in the city was $35,625, and the median income for a family was $43,083. Males had a median income of $26,250 versus $20,156 for females. The per capita income for the city was $17,048. About 8.1% of families and 12.9% of the population were below the poverty line, including 16.0% of those under age 18 and 19.5% of those age 65 or over.

== Arts and culture ==
=== Annual cultural events ===
Brooten hosts a community celebration called Bonanza Valley Days on the second weekend of July. It begins with a dance on Friday and ends with an Ice Cream Social on Sunday. Events include a bike rally, fireworks, pageant, kiddie parade, grand parade, and more.

== Education ==
Belgrade–Brooten–Elrosa Elementary School is located in Brooten. The school is part of the Belgrade-Brooten-Elrosa School District—ISD #2364.

== Infrastructure ==
=== Transportation ===
Minnesota State Highway 55 serves as a main route in the community.

The Brooten Municipal Airport is approximately one mile southeast of the city and has a paved, 3500-foot runway.
