= Montrose, Minnesota =

City in Minnesota, United States

Montrose
- City
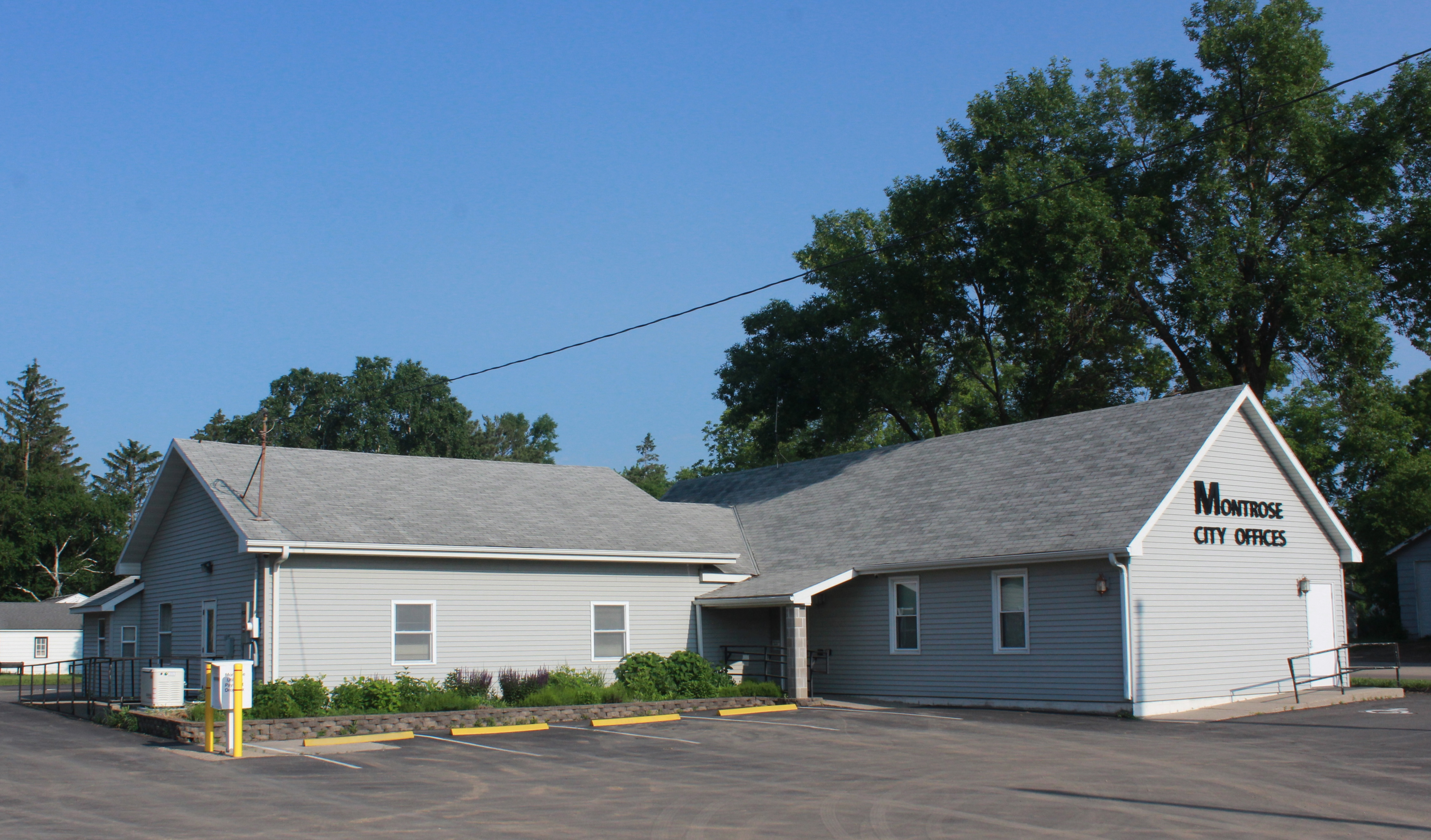
- City Offices
- Motto: "It's Good to be Home"
- Location of the city of Montrose within Wright County, Minnesota
- Coordinates: 45°4′2″N 93°54′45″W
- Country: United States
- State: Minnesota
- County: Wright

Area
  - Total: 3.08 sq mi (7.99 km^{2})
  - Land: 3.08 sq mi (7.97 km^{2})
  - Water: 0.0077 sq mi (0.02 km^{2})
- Elevation: 994 ft (303 m)

Population (2020)
  - Total: 3,775
  - Density: 1,226.0/sq mi (473.38/km^{2})
- Time zone: UTC-6 (Central (CST))
  - Summer (DST): UTC-5 (CDT)
- ZIP code: 55363
- Area code: 763
- FIPS code: 27-43810
- GNIS feature ID: 0648049
- Website: www.montrose-mn.com

Montrose is a small city in Wright County, Minnesota, United States. Montrose is surrounded by farmland, prairies, and lakes. The population was 3,775 at the 2020 census.

== History ==
Montrose was platted in 1878, and named after Montrose, in Scotland. Montrose was incorporated in 1881. The Dr. E.P. Hawkins Clinic, Hospital, and House, an early-20th-century medical complex, is listed on the National Register of Historic Places.

== Geography ==
According to the United States Census Bureau, the city has a total area of 3.21 square miles (8.31 km^{2}); 3.20 square miles (8.29 km^{2}) is land and 0.01 square miles (0.03 km^{2}) is water. U.S. Highway 12 and Minnesota State Highway 25 are two of the main routes in the community.

Nearby places include Delano, Buffalo, Hanover, Rockford, Waverly, and Watertown.

== Demographics ==
Historical population
Census	Pop.	Note	%±
1880	141		—
1890	214		51.8%
1900	305		42.5%
1910	284		−6.9%
1920	268		−5.6%
1930	233		−13.1%
1940	275		18.0%
1950	300		9.1%
1960	360		20.0%
1970	379		5.3%
1980	762		101.1%
1990	1,008		32.3%
2000	1,143		13.4%
2010	2,847		149.1%
2020	3,775		32.6%
U.S. Decennial Census

=== 2020 census ===
As of the 2020 census, Montrose had a population of 3,775. The median age was 32.4 years. 31.5% of residents were under the age of 18 and 7.2% of residents were 65 years of age or older. For every 100 females there were 105.9 males, and for every 100 females age 18 and over there were 106.0 males age 18 and over.

96.0% of residents lived in urban areas, while 4.0% lived in rural areas.

There were 1,319 households in Montrose, of which 45.2% had children under the age of 18 living in them. Of all households, 54.5% were married-couple households, 18.7% were households with a male householder and no spouse or partner present, and 15.3% were households with a female householder and no spouse or partner present. About 20.9% of all households were made up of individuals and 5.7% had someone living alone who was 65 years of age or older.

There were 1,374 housing units, of which 4.0% were vacant. The homeowner vacancy rate was 0.8% and the rental vacancy rate was 5.4%.

Racial composition as of the 2020 census
Race	Number	Percent
White	3,374	89.4%
Black or African American	87	2.3%
American Indian and Alaska Native	11	0.3%
Asian	55	1.5%
Native Hawaiian and Other Pacific Islander	3	0.1%
Some other race	68	1.8%
Two or more races	177	4.7%
Hispanic or Latino (of any race)	142	3.8%

=== 2010 census ===
As of the census of 2010, there were 2,847 people, 1,043 households, and 734 families living in the city. The population density was 889.7 inhabitants per square mile (343.5/km^{2}). There were 1,116 housing units at an average density of 348.8 per square mile (134.7/km^{2}). The racial makeup of the city was 95.2% White, 0.6% African American, 0.2% Native American, 0.9% Asian, 1.2% from other races, and 1.9% from two or more races. Hispanic or Latino of any race were 3.0% of the population.

There were 1,043 households, of which 46.1% had children under the age of 18 living with them, 54.6% were married couples living together, 9.2% had a female householder with no husband present, 6.6% had a male householder with no wife present, and 29.6% were non-families. 22.1% of all households were made up of individuals, and 4.8% had someone living alone who was 65 years of age or older. The average household size was 2.73 and the average family size was 3.23.

The median age in the city was 29.5 years. 31.9% of residents were under the age of 18; 7% were between the ages of 18 and 24; 40.2% were from 25 to 44; 15.4% were from 45 to 64; and 5.4% were 65 years of age or older. The gender makeup of the city was 50.2% male and 49.8% female.

=== 2000 census ===
As of the census of 2000, there were 1,143 people, 454 households, and 281 families living in the city. The population density was 1,190.4 inhabitants per square mile (459.6/km^{2}). There were 467 housing units at an average density of 486.3 per square mile (187.8/km^{2}). The racial makeup of the city was 97.20% White, 0.70% African American, 0.17% Asian, 1.31% from other races, and 0.61% from two or more races. Hispanic or Latino of any race were 1.31% of the population.

There were 454 households, out of which 36.6% had children under the age of 18 living with them, 51.1% were married couples living together, 6.8% had a female householder with no husband present, and 37.9% were non-families. 30.8% of all households were made up of individuals, and 7.3% had someone living alone who was 65 years of age or older. The average household size was 2.52 and the average family size was 3.18.

In the city, the population was spread out, with 28.7% under the age of 18, 11.6% from 18 to 24, 34.1% from 25 to 44, 17.7% from 45 to 64, and 7.9% who were 65 years of age or older. The median age was 30 years. For every 100 females, there were 107.4 males. For every 100 females age 18 and over, there were 107.9 males.

The median income for a household in the city was $39,583, and the median income for a family was $52,833. Males had a median income of $31,434 versus $26,481 for females. The per capita income for the city was $19,281. About 4.6% of families and 6.4% of the population were below the poverty line, including 6.1% of those under age 18 and 4.0% of those age 65 or over.

== Politics ==
Presidential election results

2020 Precinct Results Spreadsheet2016 Precinct Results Spreadsheet2012 Precinct Results Spreadsheet2008 Precinct Results Spreadsheet2004 Precinct Results Spreadsheet2000 Precinct Results Spreadsheet1996 Precinct Results1992 Precinct Results1988 Precinct Results1984 Precinct Results1980 Precinct Results1976 Precinct Results1968 Precinct Results1964 Precinct Results1960 Precinct Results
Year	Republican	Democratic	Third parties
2020	67.6% 1,293	29.9% 572	2.5% 49
2016	65.6% 1,069	25.2% 411	9.2% 149
2012	58.7% 928	36.9% 582	2.4% 70
2008	57.7% 819	39.8% 565	2.5% 36
2004	57.9% 651	41.1% 462	1.0% 11
2000	47.4% 229	40.6% 196	12.0% 58
1996	32.2% 119	46.9% 173	20.9% 77
1992	23.9% 102	42.4% 181	33.7% 144
1988	47.5% 172	52.5% 190	0.0% 0
1984	46.3% 156	53.7% 181	0.0% 0
1980	35.9% 103	55.1% 158	9.0% 26
1976	30.3% 72	67.2% 160	2.5% 6
1968	31.0% 54	69.0% 120	0.0% 0
1964	30.9% 54	69.1% 121	0.0% 0
1960	51.7% 89	47.7% 82	0.6% 1

== Gallery ==
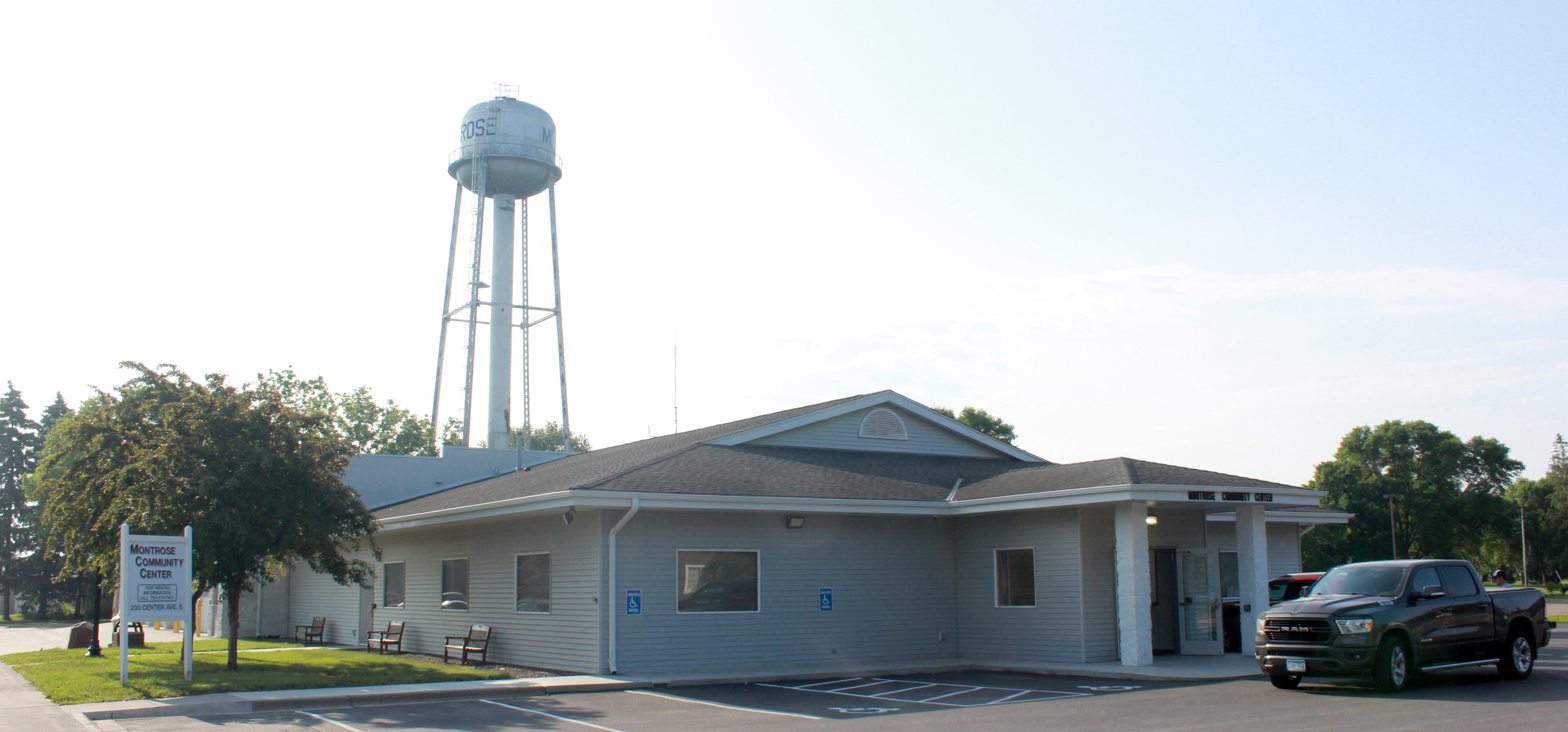
Community Center

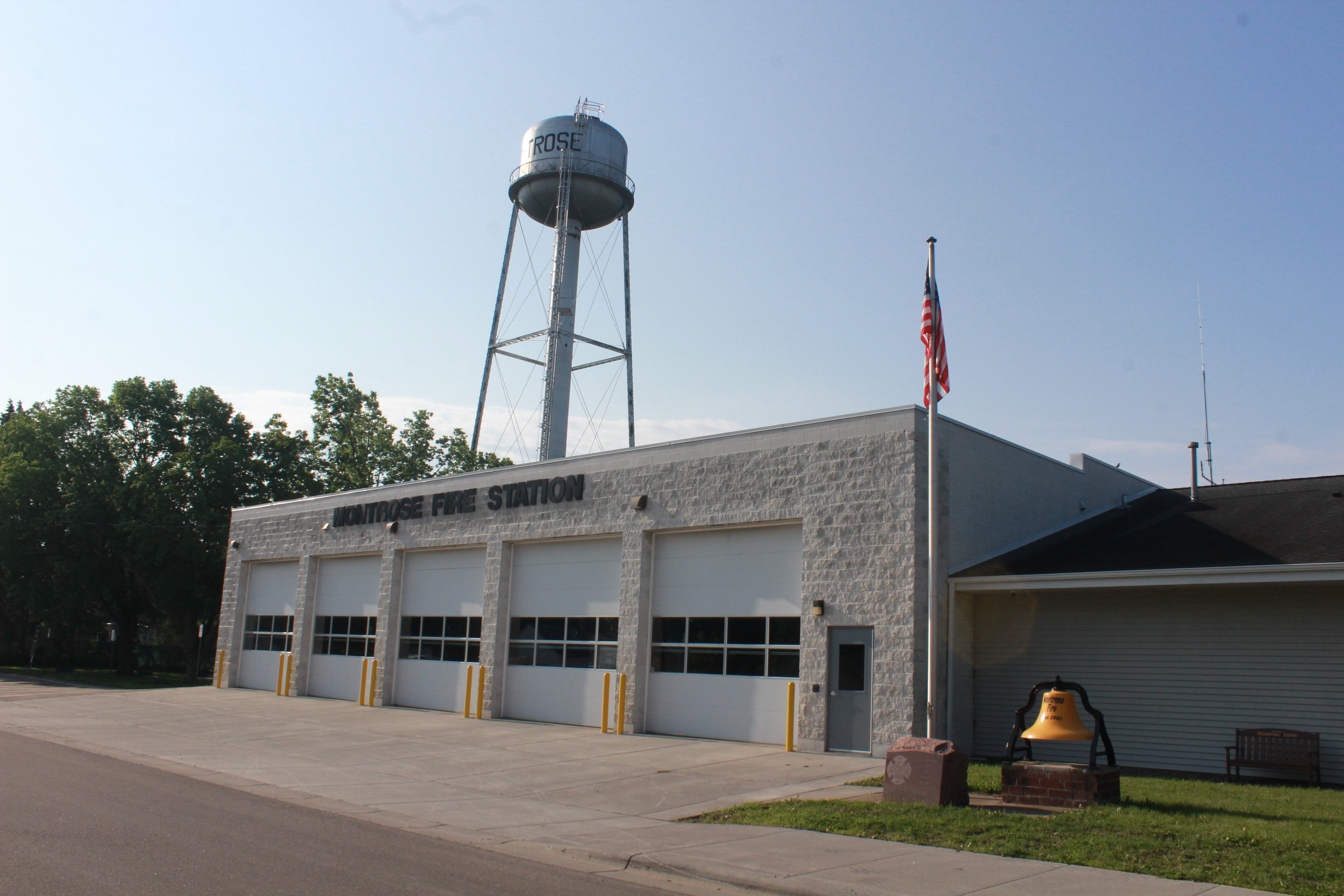
Fire Station

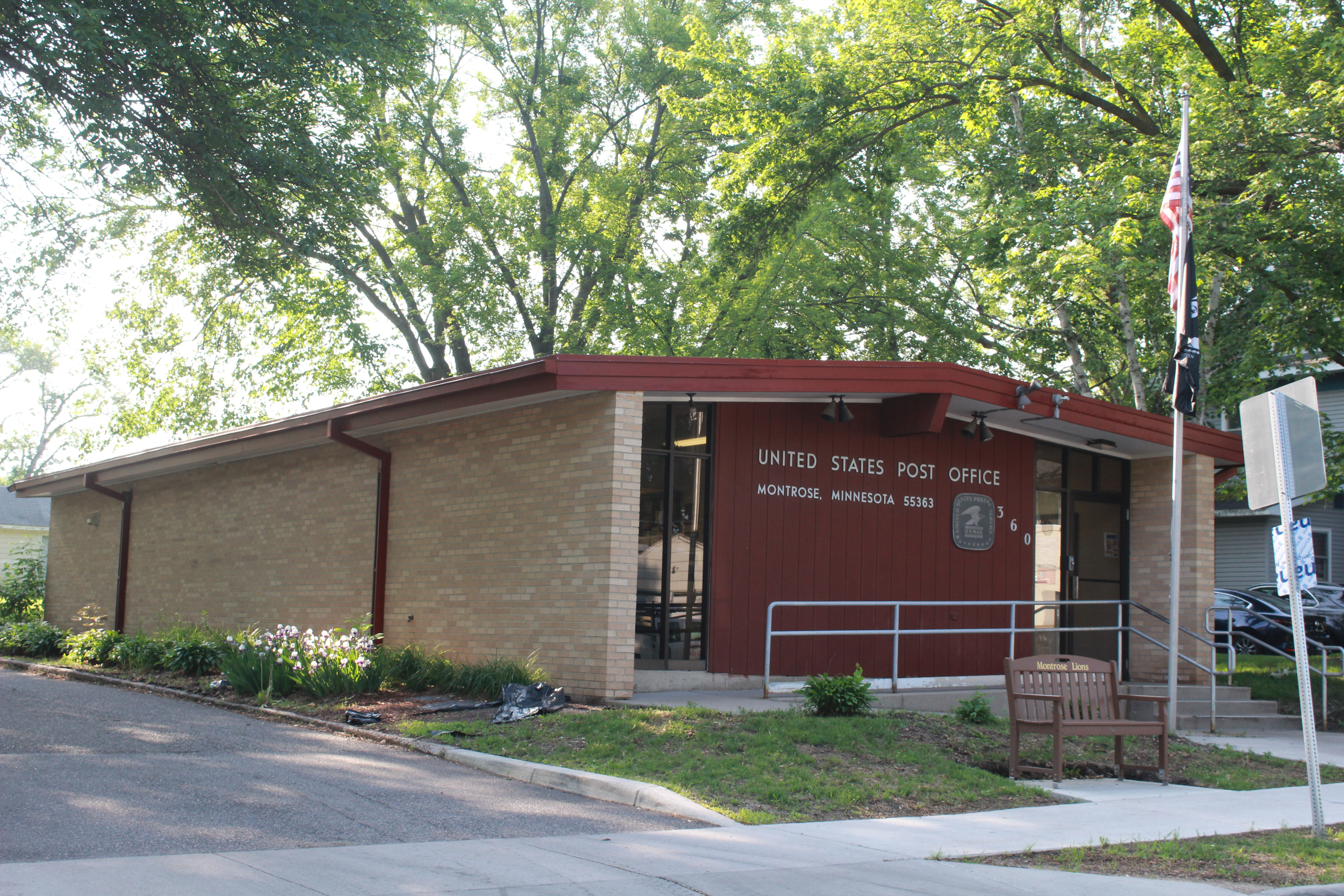
Post Office

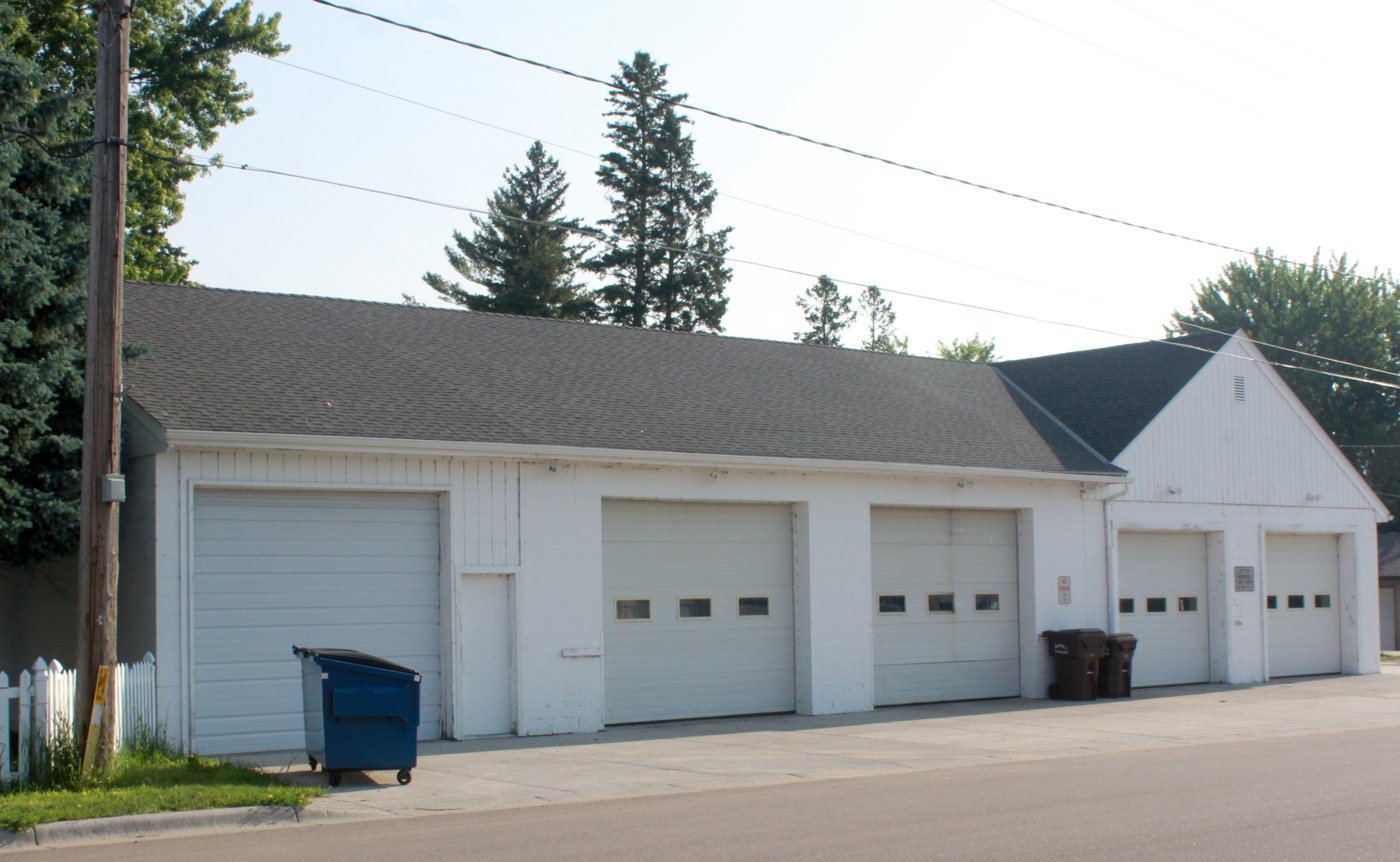
Public Works
