= Stockholm Township, Wright County, Minnesota =

Stockholm Township, Minnesota
- Township
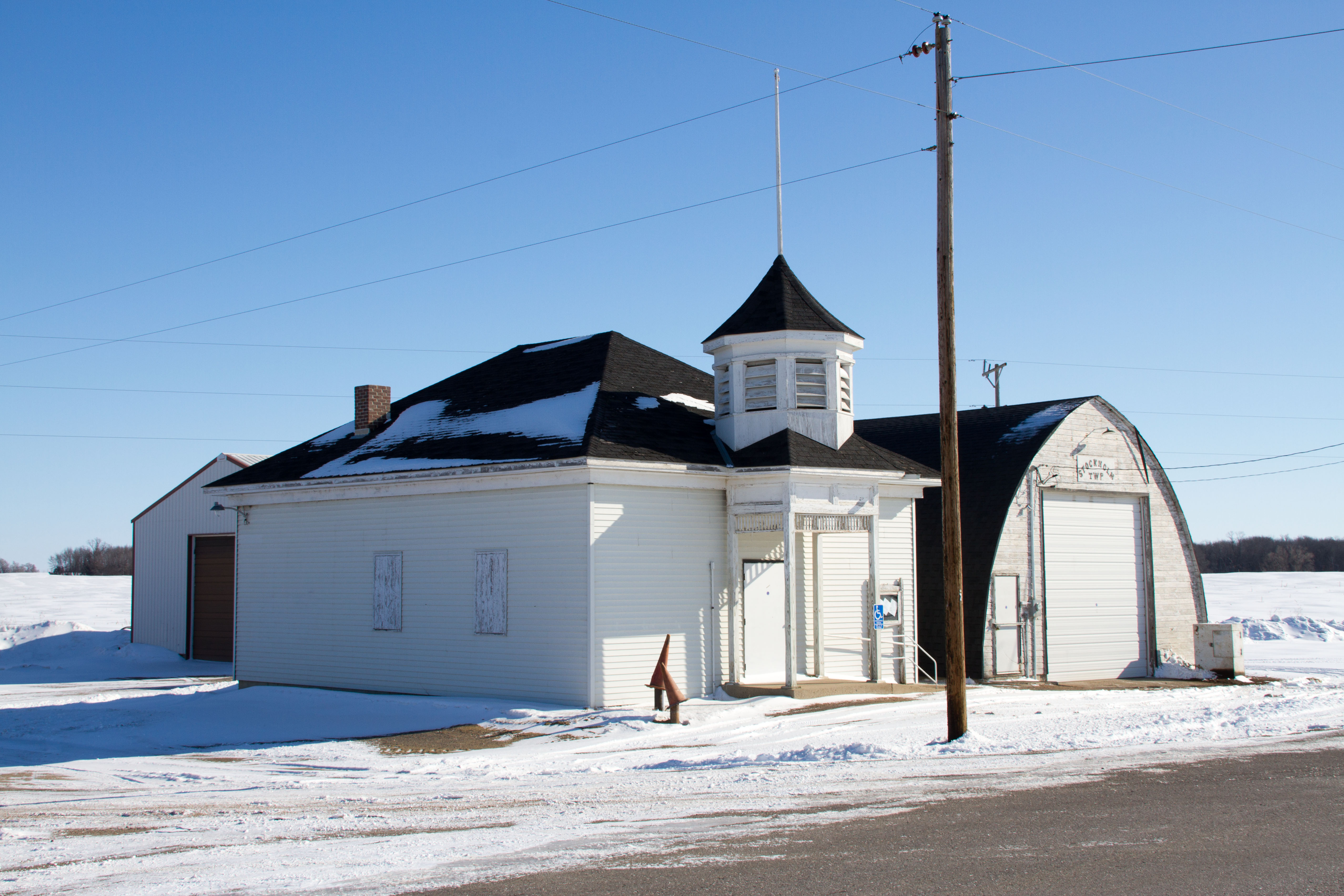
- Stockholm Township Hall

- Location within the state of Minnesota Stockholm Township, Minnesota (the United States)
- Coordinates: 45°2′N 94°11′W
- Country: United States
- State: Minnesota
- County: Wright

Area
  - Total: 35.6 sq mi (92.1 km^{2})
  - Land: 34.5 sq mi (89.4 km^{2})
  - Water: 1.0 sq mi (2.7 km^{2})
- Elevation: 1,024 ft (312 m)

Population (2000)
  - Total: 805
  - Density: 23/sq mi (9/km^{2})
- Time zone: UTC-6 (Central (CST))
  - Summer (DST): UTC-5 (CDT)
- FIPS code: 27-62878
- GNIS feature ID: 0665713

Stockholm Township is a township in Wright County, Minnesota, United States. The population was 805 at the 2000 census.

Stockholm Township was organized in 1868, and named after Stockholm, Sweden, the capital of the native land of a large share of the early settlers.

== Geography ==
According to the United States Census Bureau, the township has a total area of 35.5 square miles (92.1 km^{2}), of which 34.5 square miles (89.4 km^{2}) is land and 1.0 square mile (2.7 km^{2}) (2.95%) is water.

Stockholm Township is located in Township 118 North of the Arkansas Base Line and Range 28 West of the 5th Principal Meridian.

== Demographics ==
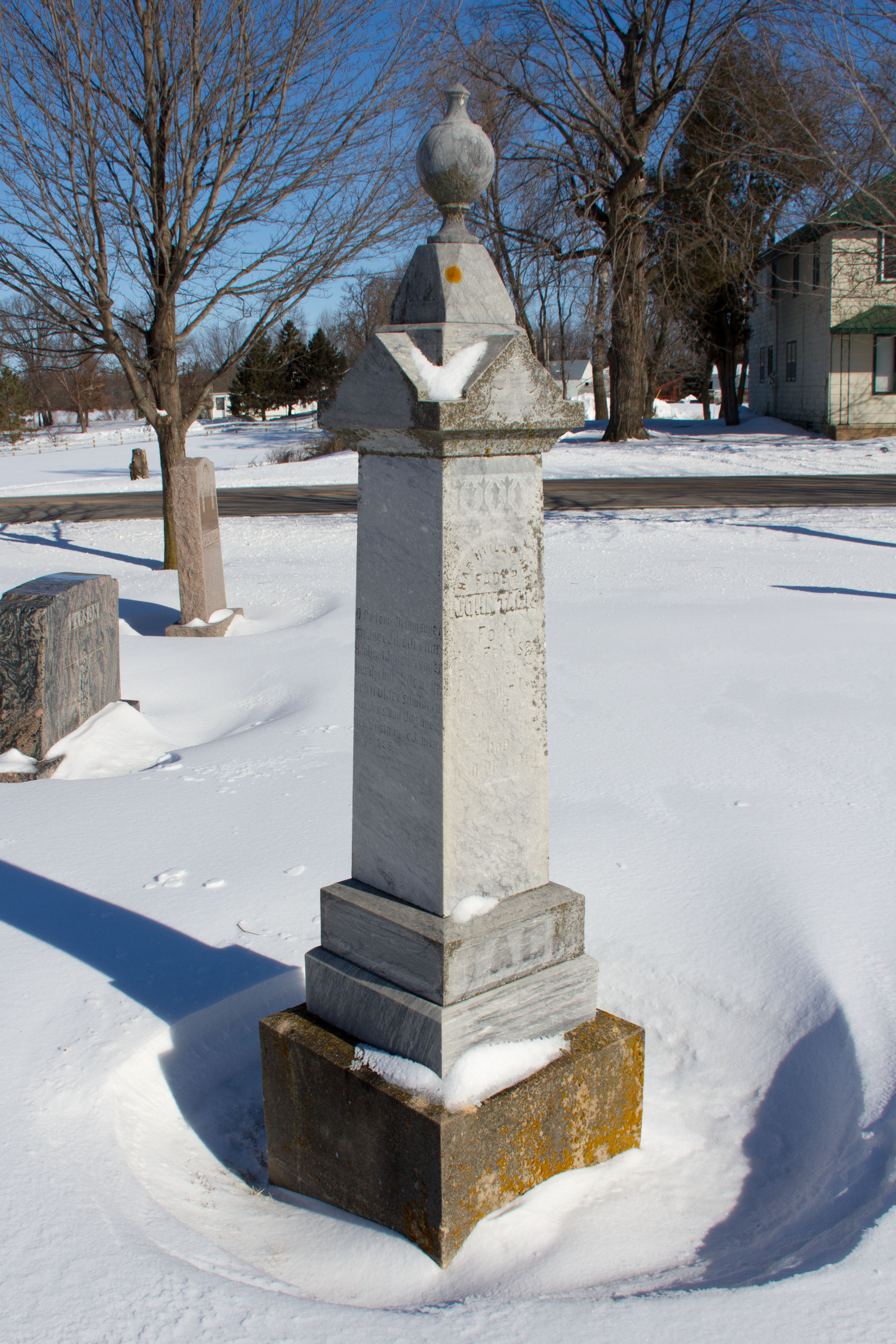
Many gravestones like this one are written in the Swedish language of the township's early immigrants.

As of the census of 2000, there were 805 people, 258 households, and 212 families residing in the township. The population density was 23.3 people per square mile (9.0/km^{2}). There were 287 housing units at an average density of 8.3/sq mi (3.2/km^{2}). The racial makeup of the township was 97.52% White, 0.25% African American, 0.12% Native American, 0.12% Pacific Islander, 1.86% from other races, and 0.12% from two or more races. Hispanic or Latino of any race were 2.24% of the population. 34.2% were of German, 16.6% Swedish, 13.8% Finnish and 11.3% Polish ancestry.

There were 258 households, out of which 44.2% had children under the age of 18 living with them, 77.9% were married couples living together, 1.9% had a female householder with no husband present, and 17.8% were non-families. 12.8% of all households were made up of individuals, and 5.0% had someone living alone who was 65 years of age or older. The average household size was 3.04 and the average family size was 3.36.

In the township the population was spread out, with 34.4% under the age of 18, 6.5% from 18 to 24, 28.4% from 25 to 44, 22.1% from 45 to 64, and 8.6% who were 65 years of age or older. The median age was 33 years. For every 100 females, there were 119.3 males. For every 100 females age 18 and over, there were 116.4 males.

The median income for a household in the township was $52,321, and the median income for a family was $55,833. Males had a median income of $38,854 versus $24,531 for females. The per capita income for the township was $17,598. About 3.8% of families and 3.7% of the population were below the poverty line, including 3.9% of those under age 18 and 5.5% of those age 65 or over.
