= Albrecht =

Name list

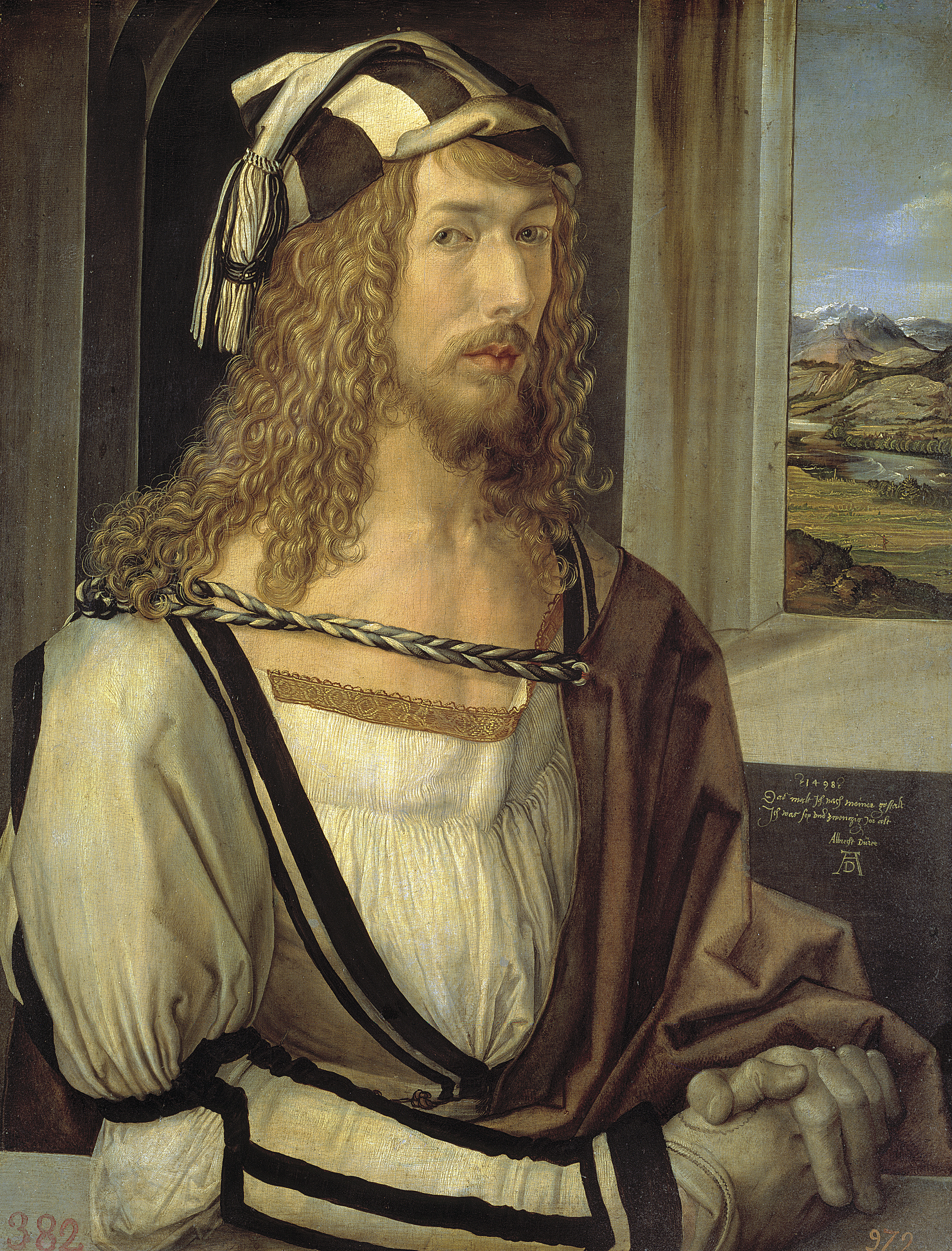
- Albrecht Dürer
- Pronunciation: /ˈʌlbrɛkt/ German: [ˈalbʁɛçt]
- Language: German

Other names
- See also: Albert

Albrecht ("noble", "bright") is a given name or surname of German origin and may refer to:

== First name ==
- Albrecht Agthe, (1790–1873), German music teacher
- Albrecht Altdorfer, (c. 1480–1538) German Renaissance painter
- Albrecht Becker, (1906–2002), German production designer, photographer, and actor
- Albrecht Berblinger, (1770–1829), German constructor (the tailor of ulm)
- Albrecht Brandi, (1914–1966), German U-boat commander in World War II
- Archduke Albrecht, Duke of Teschen (1817–1895) general who controlled the Austrian Army
- Albrecht, Duke of Württemberg, (1865–1939), German field marshal in World War I
- Albrecht von Wallenstein, (1583–1634), Bohemian soldier and politician during the Thirty Years' War
- Albrecht Dieterich, (1866–1908) German classical philologist and religious scholar
- Albrecht Dietz, (1926–2012), German entrepreneur and scientist
- Albrecht Dürer, (1471–1528), German artist and mathematician
- Albrecht Dürer the Elder, German goldsmith and father of Albrecht Dürer
- Albrecht Elof Ihre, (1797–1877), Swedish diplomat and politician
- Albrecht Fölsing, (1940–2018), German physicist and scientific journalist
- Albrecht Fleckenstein, (1917–92), German pharmacologist and physiologist
- Albrecht Haushofer, (1903–1945), German geographer, diplomat and author.
- Albrecht Holder, (born 1958), classical bassoonist
- Albrecht Gessler, German bailiff
- Albrecht Glockendon II (died 1545), German miniaturist and woodcutter
- Albrecht Gustav von Manstein, (1805–1877), Prussian general
- Albrecht II, Count of Hohenberg-Rotenburg (c. 1235–1298), Count of Hohenberg and Haigerloch
- Albrecht Kossel, (1853–1927), German biochemist and pioneer in the study of genetics
- Albrecht Krügel, (1913–1945), German Lieutenant Colonel of SS
- Albrecht Mayer, (born 1965), German oboeist
- Albrecht Mertz von Quirnheim, (1905–1944), German officer and a resistance fighter in Nazi Germany (20 July plot)
- Albrecht Müller, (1939–2018), German sprint canoer and rower
- Albrecht Penck, (1858–1945), German geographer and geologist
- Albrecht Pfister, (c. 1420–c. 1466), German printer
- Albrecht Ritschl, (1822–1889), German Protestant theologian
- Albrecht Ritschl (economist), German Professor of Economic History
- Albrecht Roser, (1922–2011), German master puppeteer
- Albrecht von Roon, (1803–79), Prussian soldier and statesman
- Albrecht III Achilles, (1414–86), Prince-elector of the Margraviate of Brandenburg
- Albrecht of Sweden, (c.1338–1412), medieval Swedish monarch
- Albrecht Schmidt (actor), (1870–1945), Danish film actor
- Albrecht Schöne (1925–2025), German Germanist
- Albrecht Schröter, (born 1955), German politician (SPD), mayor of Jena
- Albrecht Unsöld, (1905–95), German astrophysicist
- Albrecht Weber, (1825–1901), German Indologist and historian
- Albrecht of Saxe-Weissenfels, (1659–1692), German prince of the House of Wettin

== Surname ==
- Achim Albrecht (born 1962), German bodybuilder and professional wrestler
- Alex Albrecht (born 1976), American television personality
- Andreas Albrecht (cosmologist), American physicist
- Art Albrecht (1921–2004), former professional American football player
- Bernard Albrecht, an alias of Bernard Sumner, English singer and guitarist
- Berthold Albrecht (1954–2012), German businessman (ALDI), brother of Theo Jr
- Carter Albrecht (1973–2007), American musician
- Christian Albrecht (politician, born 1982), German politician
- Christian Albrecht (politician, born 1989), German politician
- Conrad Albrecht (1880–1969), German admiral
- Daniel Albrecht (born 1983), Swiss alpine ski racer
- Egon Albrecht-Lemke (1918-1944), German-Brazilian Luftwaffe fighter
- Erich Albrecht (1907-1997), German germanist and writer
- Ernst Albrecht (politician, born 1914) (1914–1991), German politician (CDU)
- Ernst Albrecht (politician, born 1930), (1930–2014), German politician (CDU)
- Ernst Albrecht (footballer), (1907–1976), German footballer
- Friedrich Wilhelm Albrecht, (1894–1984) Lutheran missionary in Central Australia
- George Alexander Albrecht, German conductor, (1935–2021), long-time music director in Hanover
- Gerd Albrecht (1935–2014), German conductor known for work in contemporary music
- Grant Albrecht (born 1981), Canadian luger
- Gretchen Albrecht (born 1943), New Zealand artist
- Harold Albrecht (born 1949), Canadian politician
- Herman Albrecht (1876-1900), South African soldier
- Herbert Albrecht (1900–1945), German politician
- J. I. Albrecht (1931-2008), American-Canadian sports personality
- Jan Philipp Albrecht (born 1982), German politician and Member of the European Parliament
- Katherine Albrecht (born 1968), American privacy activist
- Karl Albrecht, (1920–2014), German entrepreneur, brother of Theo Albrecht (ALDI)
- Karl Albrecht Jr. (born 1948), German businessman
- Lisa Albrecht (1896–1958), German politician
- Marc Albrecht (born 1964), German conductor, chief conductor of De Nederlandse Opera in Amsterdam from 2011
- Michael Albrecht (born 1947), German politician
- Milan Albrecht (born 1950), Slovak footballer
- Rafael Albrecht (1941-2021), Argentine footballer
- Raymond John Albrecht (1916–2006), American farmer and politician
- Rita Albrecht (born 1955), American public servant
- Susanne Albrecht, (born 1951), German activist (Red Army Faction)
- Sylvia Albrecht (born 1962), German speed-skater
- Theo Albrecht, (1922–2010), German entrepreneur, founder of Aldi Nord, brother of Karl
- Theo Albrecht Jr. (born 1950), German businessman, son of Theo
- Theodore Albrecht (1945–2025), American music historian, Beethoven scholar
- Wilhelm Eduard Albrecht, (1800–1876), German jurist and politician
- William Albrecht (1888-1974), American agronomist
- William P. Albrecht, (1935–2024), American economist

== Other ==
- Albrecht v. Herald Co., a 1968 U.S. Supreme Court decision

== See also ==
- Alberich
