= Lake Addie, Minnesota =

Ghost town in Minnesota

- Ghost town
- Location within Minnesota Location within the United States
- Coordinates: 44°46′39″N 94°21′58″W
- Country: United States
- State: Minnesota
- County: McLeod
- Township: Sumter
- Time zone: UTC-6 (Central (CST))
  - Summer (DST): UTC-5 (CDT)
- ZIP code: 55312 (Brownton)
- Area code: 320

Lake Addie is a ghost town in Sumter Township, McLeod County, in the U.S. state of Minnesota.

== History ==
Lake Addie was a small community with a post office. A post office was established at Lake Addie in 1868, and remained in operation until it was discontinued in 1879.

Historical population
Census	Pop.	Note	%±
1880	72		—
U.S. Decennial Census
