= King Lake =

King Lake may refer to:

- King Lake (St. Ignace Island), a lake on St. Ignace Island, Ontario
- King Lake (Parry Sound District), a lake in Parry Sound District, Ontario
- King Lake (Cochrane District), a lake in Cochrane District, Ontario
- King Lake (Empress Creek, Thunder Bay District), a lake on the mainland of Thunder Bay District, Ontario
- King Lake (Sudbury District), a lake in Sudbury District, Ontario
- King Lake (Kenora District), a lake in Kenora District, Ontario
- King Lake (Slate Islands), a lake in the Slate Islands of Ontario
- King Lake (Lennox and Addington County), a lake in Lennox and Addington County, Ontario
- King Lake (Itasca County, Minnesota), a lake
- King Lake (Meeker County, Minnesota)
- King Lake, Nebraska, a census-designated place in Douglas County
- King Lake (Nova Scotia), a lake of Hants County
- King Lake (Dekalb County, Missouri)

== See also ==
- Kings Lake (disambiguation)
- Kinglake (disambiguation)
- Lake King, Western Australia
