= Raymond John Albrecht =

American politician

- Albrecht’s official portrait in the 70th Minnesota Legislative Session (1977)

Member of the Minnesota House of Representatives 23A (McLeod, Shibley)
- In office January 6, 1975 – January 4, 1981

Personal details
- Born: Raymond John Albrecht; April 2, 1916 Penn Township, McLeod County, Minnesota
- Died: July 24, 2006 (aged 90)
- Party: Republican

Raymond John Albrecht (April 2, 1916 – July 24, 2006) was an American farmer and politician.

Albrecht was born in Penn Township, McLeod County, Minnesota. Albrecht lived with his wife and family in Brownton, Minnesota and was a dairy and grain farmer. Albrecht served in the Minnesota House of Representatives from 1975 to 1980 and was a Republican.

== Personal life ==
Albrecht was a Lutheran. He was of German descent. He married Norma Dahlke and had 5 children, Dwayne, Stanley, Donald, Diane, and Karen.
