= Sumter, Minnesota =

- Unincorporated community
- Location within Minnesota Location within the United States
- Coordinates: 44°44′22″N 94°15′48″W
- Country: United States
- State: Minnesota
- County: McLeod
- Township: Sumter
- Elevation: 1,030 ft (310 m)
- Time zone: UTC-6 (Central (CST))
  - Summer (DST): UTC-5 (CDT)
- ZIP code: 55312 and 55336
- Area code: 320
- GNIS feature ID: 654968

Sumter is an unincorporated community in Sumter Township, McLeod County, Minnesota, United States. The community is located along Highway 212 at Leaf Avenue near Brownton and Glencoe.
