= Fernando, Minnesota =

- Unincorporated community
- Location within Minnesota Location within the United States
- Coordinates: 44°39′06″N 94°27′28″W
- Country: United States
- State: Minnesota
- County: McLeod
- Township: Round Grove
- Elevation: 1,060 ft (320 m)
- Time zone: UTC-6 (Central (CST))
  - Summer (DST): UTC-5 (CDT)
- ZIP code: 55385
- Area code: 320
- GNIS feature ID: 643613

Fernando is an unincorporated community in Round Grove Township, McLeod County, Minnesota, United States, near Stewart and Brownton. The community is located near the junction of McLeod County Roads 7 and 17.

The community had a post office from 1899 to 1903. Unusually, Fernando's post office was located in the creamery, with the buttermaker, Ferdinand W. Fenske, acting as postmaster. The community was near a station along the former Chicago, Milwaukee, St. Paul and Pacific Railroad.
