= Sherman, Minnesota =

- Unincorporated community
- Location within Minnesota Location within the United States
- Coordinates: 44°56′52″N 94°08′01″W
- Country: United States
- State: Minnesota
- County: McLeod
- Townships: Hale and Winsted
- Elevation: 1,047 ft (319 m)
- Time zone: UTC-6 (Central (CST))
  - Summer (DST): UTC-5 (CDT)
- ZIP code: 55395 and 55381
- Area code: 320
- GNIS feature ID: 654938

Sherman is an unincorporated community in McLeod County, Minnesota, United States. The community is located along McLeod County Road 5 near Winsted and Silver Lake. County Roads 31 and 86 are also in the immediate area.

Sherman is located within Hale and Winsted Townships.
