= Komensky =

Komenský or Komensky may refer to:

- John Amos Comenius (1592–1670, born Jan Amos Komenský), Czech philosopher
- 1861 Komenský, a minor planet

Places:

- Komensky, Minnesota, unincorporated community in McLeod County, Minnesota, United States
- Komensky, Wisconsin, town in Jackson County, Wisconsin, United States
