= Kinglake =

Kinglake may refer to

- Kinglake (surname)
- Kinglake, Ontario, a community in Canada
- Kinglake, Victoria, a town in Australia
  - ABC Kinglake Ranges, a temporary radio service broadcasting from Kinglake, Victoria
  - Kinglake Football Club from Kinglake, Victoria
- Kinglake West, Victoria, a town in Australia
- Kinglake National Park in Central Victoria, Australia

== See also ==
- King Lake (disambiguation)
- Lake King, Western Australia
