= Acoma Township, McLeod County, Minnesota =

Acoma Township, Minnesota
- Township
- Location within Minnesota Location within the United States
- Coordinates: 44°56′35″N 94°26′15″W
- Country: United States
- State: Minnesota
- County: McLeod

Area
  - Total: 34.87 sq mi (90.3 km^{2})
  - Land: 31.51 sq mi (81.6 km^{2})
  - Water: 3.36 sq mi (8.7 km^{2})
- Elevation: 1,086 ft (331 m)

Population (2020)
  - Total: 1,130
  - Density: 35.9/sq mi (13.9/km^{2})
- Time zone: UTC-6 (Central (CST))
  - Summer (DST): UTC-5 (CDT)
- ZIP Code: 55350 (Hutchinson)
- FIPS code: 27-085-00136
- GNIS feature ID: 0663376
- Website: www.acomatownship.com

Acoma Township (/ˈækəmə/ AK-ə-mə) is a township in McLeod County, Minnesota, United States. The population was 1,130 at the 2020 census.

Acoma Township was named after the Acoma Pueblo in New Mexico.

== Geography ==
The township is in the northwest corner of McLeod County. It is bordered to the north and west by Meeker County and to the southeast by the city of Hutchinson, the largest city in McLeod County. Minnesota State Highway 7 crosses the southwest part of the township, leading southeast into Hutchinson and west to Cosmos.

According to the U.S. Census Bureau, the township has a total area of 34.9 square miles (90 km^{2}), of which 31.5 square miles (82 km^{2}) are land and 3.4 square miles (8.8 km^{2}), or 9.62%, are water. Cedar Lake and Belle Lake are in the north, and there are at least nine other named lakes in the township. The township is drained by the South Fork of the Crow River. The Crow River watershed runs east and then northeast to the Mississippi River at Dayton.

The Acoma Township hall address is 23486 230th St, Hutchinson, MN 55350 and is also the polling place for that area.

== Demographics ==
Historical population
Census	Pop.	Note	%±
1860	93		—
1870	392		321.5%
1880	588		50.0%
1890	716		21.8%
1900	732		2.2%
1910	664		−9.3%
1920	733		10.4%
1930	735		0.3%
1940	670		−8.8%
1950	673		0.4%
1960	788		17.1%
1970	848		7.6%
1980	881		3.9%
1990	1,040		18.0%
2000	1,185		13.9%
2010	1,149		−3.0%
2020	1,130		−1.7%
U.S. Decennial Census

As of the census of 2000, there were 1,185 people, 387 households, and 332 families residing in the township. The population density was 37.7 inhabitants per square mile (14.6/km^{2}). There were 397 housing units at an average density of 12.6/sq mi (4.9/km^{2}). The racial makeup of the township was 99.07% White, 0.08% African American, 0.17% Native American, 0.17% Asian, 0.17% from other races, and 0.34% from two or more races. Hispanic or Latino of any race were 0.25% of the population.

There were 387 households, out of which 45.7% had children under the age of 18 living with them, 79.1% were married couples living together, 3.4% had a female householder with no husband present, and 14.2% were non-families. 11.6% of all households were made up of individuals, and 3.9% had someone living alone who was 65 years of age or older. The average household size was 3.06 and the average family size was 3.33.

In the township the population was spread out, with 32.2% under the age of 18, 5.5% from 18 to 24, 28.9% from 25 to 44, 25.8% from 45 to 64, and 7.6% who were 65 years of age or older. The median age was 38 years. For every 100 females, there were 107.2 males. For every 100 females age 18 and over, there were 112.7 males.

The median income for a household in the township was $67,292, and the median income for a family was $71,458. Males had a median income of $41,563 versus $31,667 for females. The per capita income for the township was $23,302. About 2.4% of families and 4.1% of the population were below the poverty line, including 5.0% of those under age 18 and 5.0% of those age 65 or over.
