= Cedar Lake (McLeod and Meeker counties, Minnesota) =

Lake in the state of Minnesota, United States

- Location within Minnesota
- Location: McLeod and Meeker counties
- Coordinates: 44°58′40″N 94°27′41″W
- Type: Lake
- Surface elevation: 1,076 feet (328 m)

Cedar Lake is a lake in McLeod and Meeker counties, in the U.S. state of Minnesota.

Cedar Lake was named for the red cedar trees near the lake. Although Cedar Lake is a large lake (1,860 acres) it is also quite shallow lake reaching only 8 feet (2.4 m) deep. The bottom of the lake consists of silt and detritus and has abundant curly-leaf pondweed in the spring months before it dies back in July. The lake has a history of winterkill and there is fish migration from nearby Belle Lake. The lake has abundant common carp and black bullheads as well as moderate numbers of northern pike and black crappie.

== See also ==
- List of lakes in Minnesota
