= Round Grove Township, McLeod County, Minnesota =

Round Grove Township, Minnesota
- Township
- Location within Minnesota Location within the United States
- Coordinates: 44°40′12″N 94°25′38″W
- Country: United States
- State: Minnesota
- County: McLeod

Area
  - Total: 36.1 sq mi (93 km^{2})
  - Land: 35.4 sq mi (92 km^{2})
  - Water: 0.7 sq mi (1.8 km^{2})
- Elevation: 1,043 ft (318 m)

Population (2020)
  - Total: 236
  - Density: 6.7/sq mi (2.6/km^{2})
- Time zone: UTC-6 (Central (CST))
  - Summer (DST): UTC-5 (CDT)
- ZIP Codes: 55385 (Stewart); 55312 (Brownton)
- FIPS code: 27-085-56032
- GNIS feature ID: 0665477

Round Grove Township is a township in McLeod County, Minnesota, United States. The population was 236 at the 2020 census.

== Geography ==
The township is in the southwest corner of McLeod County, bordered to the south and west by Sibley County. The northwest corner of the township is bordered to the north by the city of Stewart.

According to the U.S. Census Bureau, the township has a total area of 36.1 square miles (93 km^{2}), of which 35.4 square miles (92 km^{2}) are land and 0.7 square miles (1.8 km^{2}), or 1.88%, are water. The township is drained by High Island Creek, an east-flowing tributary of the Minnesota River.

== Demographics ==
Historical population
Census	Pop.	Note	%±
1880	386		—
1890	589		52.6%
1900	713		21.1%
1910	640		−10.2%
1920	677		5.8%
1930	679		0.3%
1940	632		−6.9%
1950	557		−11.9%
1960	471		−15.4%
1970	407		−13.6%
1980	374		−8.1%
1990	349		−6.7%
2000	276		−20.9%
2010	251		−9.1%
2020	236		−6.0%
U.S. Decennial Census

As of the census of 2000, there were 276 people, 105 households, and 78 families residing in the township. The population density was 7.7 people per square mile (3.0/km^{2}). There were 116 housing units at an average density of 3.2/sq mi (1.3/km^{2}). The racial makeup of the township was 95.65% White, 0.72% Pacific Islander, 2.54% from other races, and 1.09% from two or more races. Hispanic or Latino of any race were 2.17% of the population.

There were 105 households, out of which 27.6% had children under the age of 18 living with them, 64.8% were married couples living together, 4.8% had a female householder with no husband present, and 24.8% were non-families. 21.9% of all households were made up of individuals, and 8.6% had someone living alone who was 65 years of age or older. The average household size was 2.63 and the average family size was 3.05.

In the township the population was spread out, with 22.8% under the age of 18, 9.4% from 18 to 24, 24.6% from 25 to 44, 27.9% from 45 to 64, and 15.2% who were 65 years of age or older. The median age was 41 years. For every 100 females, there were 110.7 males. For every 100 females age 18 and over, there were 124.2 males.

The median income for a household in the township was $50,500, and the median income for a family was $52,813. Males had a median income of $27,250 versus $24,000 for females. The per capita income for the township was $20,216. About 3.8% of families and 4.8% of the population were below the poverty line, including 7.6% of those under the age of eighteen and 6.7% of those 65 or over.
