= Kings Lake =

Kings Lake may refer to:

- Kings Lake (Minnesota)
- Kings Lake (South Dakota)
- Kings Lake (horse) (American thoroughbred, foaled 1978)
- Königssee, a lake in Bavarian Germany

== See also ==
- King Lake (disambiguation)
