= South Silver Lake, Minnesota =

- Unincorporated community
- Location within Minnesota Location within the United States
- Coordinates: 44°53′06″N 94°11′57″W
- Country: United States
- State: Minnesota
- County: McLeod
- Township: Rich Valley
- Elevation: 1,060 ft (320 m)
- Time zone: UTC-6 (Central (CST))
  - Summer (DST): UTC-5 (CDT)
- ZIP code: 55381
- Area code: 320
- GNIS feature ID: 652346

South Silver Lake is an unincorporated community in Rich Valley Township, McLeod County, Minnesota, United States, near Silver Lake along Iris Road.
