= Penn Township, McLeod County, Minnesota =

Penn Township, Minnesota
- Township
- Location within Minnesota Location within the United States
- Coordinates: 44°40′22″N 94°18′14″W
- Country: United States
- State: Minnesota
- County: McLeod

Area
  - Total: 36.1 sq mi (93 km^{2})
  - Land: 34.7 sq mi (90 km^{2})
  - Water: 1.4 sq mi (3.6 km^{2})
- Elevation: 1,020 ft (310 m)

Population (2020)
  - Total: 322
  - Density: 8.8/sq mi (3.4/km^{2})
- Time zone: UTC-6 (Central (CST))
  - Summer (DST): UTC-5 (CDT)
- ZIP Codes: 55312 (Brownton); 55336 (Glencoe); 55334 (Gaylord); 55396 (Winthrop)
- FIPS code: 27-085-50308
- GNIS feature ID: 0665276

Penn Township is a township in McLeod County, Minnesota, United States. The population was 322 at the 2020 census.

== History ==
Penn Township was named for William Penn (1644–1718), founder of Pennsylvania.

== Geography ==
The township is in southern McLeod County, bordered to the south and east by Sibley County. The city of Brownton is 1 mile (1.6 km) north of the township, and New Auburn is less than a mile to the east.

According to the U.S. Census Bureau, Penn Township has a total area of 36.1 square miles (93 km^{2}), of which 34.7 square miles (90 km^{2}) are land and 1.4 square miles (3.6 km^{2}), or 3.96%, are water.

== Demographics ==
Historical population
| Census | Pop. | Note | %± |
|---|---|---|---|
| 1860 | 133 | | — |
| 1870 | 420 | | 215.8% |
| 1880 | 496 | | 18.1% |
| 1890 | 592 | | 19.4% |
| 1900 | 649 | | 9.6% |
| 1910 | 588 | | −9.4% |
| 1920 | 577 | | −1.9% |
| 1930 | 625 | | 8.3% |
| 1940 | 633 | | 1.3% |
| 1950 | 548 | | −13.4% |
| 1960 | 518 | | −5.5% |
| 1970 | 470 | | −9.3% |
| 1980 | 393 | | −16.4% |
| 1990 | 390 | | −0.8% |
| 2000 | 309 | | −20.8% |
| 2010 | 315 | | 1.9% |
| 2020 | 322 | | 2.2% |
U.S. Decennial Census

As of the census of 2000, there were 309 people, 119 households, and 87 families residing in the township. The population density was 8.8 people per square mile (3.4/km^{2}). There were 121 housing units at an average density of 3.4/sq mi (1.3/km^{2}). The racial makeup of the township was 98.71% White, 0.32% from other races, and 0.97% from two or more races. Hispanic or Latino of any race were 1.29% of the population.

There were 119 households, out of which 30.3% had children under the age of 18 living with them, 57.1% were married couples living together, 7.6% had a female householder with no husband present, and 26.1% were non-families. 21.8% of all households were made up of individuals, and 10.1% had someone living alone who was 65 years of age or older. The average household size was 2.60 and the average family size was 2.98.

In the township the population was spread out, with 25.9% under the age of 18, 6.8% from 18 to 24, 26.2% from 25 to 44, 26.5% from 45 to 64, and 14.6% who were 65 years of age or older. The median age was 38 years. For every 100 females, there were 116.1 males. For every 100 females age 18 and over, there were 120.2 males.

The median income for a household in the township was $41,528, and the median income for a family was $42,361. Males had a median income of $29,167 versus $21,875 for females. The per capita income for the township was $19,019. About 2.4% of families and 4.5% of the population were below the poverty line, including 2.7% of those under the age of eighteen and 7.1% of those 65 or over.
