= Hutchinson Township, McLeod County, Minnesota =

Hutchinson Township, Minnesota
- Township
- Location within Minnesota Location within the United States
- Coordinates: 44°55′43″N 94°18′44″W
- Country: United States
- State: Minnesota
- County: McLeod

Area
  - Total: 34.34 sq mi (88.9 km^{2})
  - Land: 32.26 sq mi (83.6 km^{2})
  - Water: 2.08 sq mi (5.4 km^{2})
- Elevation: 1,089 ft (332 m)

Population (2020)
  - Total: 1,215
  - Density: 37.7/sq mi (14.6/km^{2})
- Time zone: UTC-6 (Central (CST))
  - Summer (DST): UTC-5 (CDT)
- ZIP codes: 55350 (Hutchinson); 55381 (Silver Lake)
- Area code: 320
- FIPS code: 27-085-30662
- GNIS feature ID: 0664537
- Website: hutchinsontownshipmn.org

Hutchinson Township is a township in McLeod County, Minnesota, United States. The population was 1,215 at the 2020 census.

== History ==
When it was organized, Hutchinson took the name of its largest settlement: Hutchinson, Minnesota.

== Geography ==
The township is in northern McLeod County, bordered to the north by Meeker County and to the southwest by Hutchinson, the largest city in McLeod County.

According to the U.S. Census Bureau, the township has a total area of 34.3 square miles (89 km^{2}), of which 32.3 square miles (84 km^{2}) are land and 2.1 square miles (5.4 km^{2}), or 6.05%, are water. More than a dozen named lakes occupy the northern part of the township.

== Demographics ==
Historical population
Census	Pop.	Note	%±
1860	94		—
1870	440		368.1%
1880	1,368		210.9%
1890	1,869		36.6%
1900	2,069		10.7%
1910	1,092		−47.2%
1920	1,074		−1.6%
1930	983		−8.5%
1940	915		−6.9%
1950	894		−2.3%
1960	963		7.7%
1970	965		0.2%
1980	1,090		13.0%
1990	1,069		−1.9%
2000	1,120		4.8%
2010	1,220		8.9%
2020	1,215		−0.4%
U.S. Decennial Census

As of the census of 2000, there were 1,120 people, 401 households, and 334 families residing in the township. The population density was 34.6 inhabitants per square mile (13.4/km^{2}). There were 412 housing units at an average density of 12.7 per square mile (4.9/km^{2}). The racial makeup of the township was 98.84% White, 0.18% Asian, 0.71% from other races, and 0.27% from two or more races. Hispanic or Latino of any race were 0.80% of the population.

There were 401 households, out of which 36.7% had children under the age of 18 living with them, 74.8% were married couples living together, 5.0% had a female householder with no husband present, and 16.7% were non-families. 13.0% of all households were made up of individuals, and 7.0% had someone living alone who was 65 years of age or older. The average household size was 2.79 and the average family size was 3.07.

In the township the population was spread out, with 26.6% under the age of 18, 6.1% from 18 to 24, 28.2% from 25 to 44, 29.9% from 45 to 64, and 9.2% who were 65 years of age or older. The median age was 39 years. For every 100 females, there were 105.9 males. For every 100 females age 18 and over, there were 101.5 males.

The median income for a household in the township was $59,821, and the median income for a family was $63,021. Males had a median income of $39,375 versus $27,750 for females. The per capita income for the township was $22,269. About 1.5% of families and 3.2% of the population were below the poverty line, including 2.4% of those under age 18 and 5.0% of those age 65 or over.
