= Komensky, Minnesota =

- Unincorporated community
- Location within Minnesota Location within the United States
- Coordinates: 44°54′26″N 94°16′37″W
- Country: United States
- State: Minnesota
- County: McLeod
- Township: Hutchinson
- Elevation: 1,060 ft (320 m)
- Time zone: UTC-6 (Central (CST))
  - Summer (DST): UTC-5 (CDT)
- ZIP code: 55350
- Area code: 320
- GNIS feature ID: 654780

Komensky is an unincorporated community in Hutchinson Township, McLeod County, Minnesota, United States, near Hutchinson. The community is located along McLeod County Road 79 (200th Street) near McLeod County Road 4 (Major Avenue). Bear Creek flows through the community.
