= Osee M. Hall =

American politician

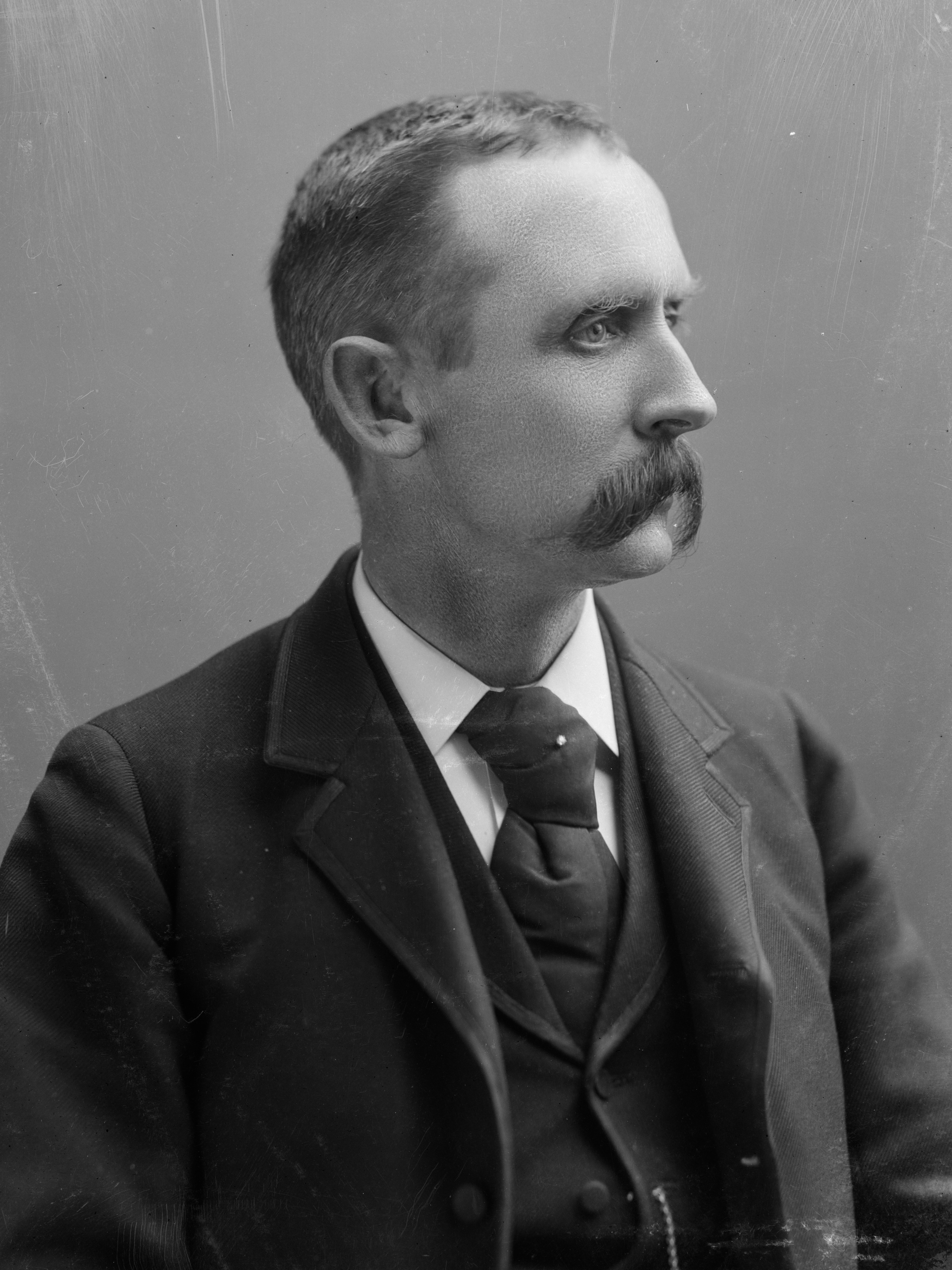
- Hall c. 1891–1894

Member of the U.S. House of Representatives from Minnesota's 3rd district
- In office March 4, 1891 – March 3, 1895
- Preceded by: Darwin Hall
- Succeeded by: Joel Heatwole

Member of the Minnesota Senate from the 22nd district
- In office January 6, 1885 – January 3, 1887
- Preceded by: Martin Spencer Chandler
- Succeeded by: Peter Nelson

Personal details
- Born: Osee Matson Hall; September 10, 1847 Conneaut, Ohio
- Died: November 26, 1914 (aged 67) Saint Paul, Minnesota
- Party: Democratic
- Spouse: Sila Elizabeth Magee
- Education: Hiram College, Williams College
- Occupation: Attorney

Osee Matson Hall (September 10, 1847 – November 26, 1914) was a U.S. representative from Minnesota.

Born in Conneaut, Ohio, he attended the local public schools and graduated from Hiram College in Ohio and from Williams College, Williamstown, Massachusetts in 1868.

He studied law and was admitted to the bar and commenced practice in Red Wing, Minnesota. He was a member of the Minnesota Senate (1885 – 1887); elected as a Democrat to the 52nd and 53rd congresses (March 4, 1891 – March 3, 1895). He was an unsuccessful candidate for reelection in 1894 to the 54th congress.

He resumed the practice of law. Was a member of the Minnesota State Tax Commission from 1907 until his death in Saint Paul, Minnesota at age 67; interment in Oakwood Cemetery in Red Wing.

U.S. House of Representatives
Preceded by Darwin Hall	U.S. Representative from Minnesota's 3rd congressional district 1891 – 1895	Succeeded by Joel Heatwole
