= Lake Hook =

Lake in the state of Minnesota, United States

- Hook Lake
- Location within Minnesota
- Location: McLeod County, Minnesota
- Coordinates: 44°57′11″N 94°20′40″W
- Type: freshwater
- Surface area: 330 acres (130 ha)
- Average depth: 8 feet (2.4 m)
- Max. depth: 18 feet (5.5 m)
- Shore length^{1}: 4 miles (6.4 km)
- ^{1} Shore length is not a well-defined measure.

Lake Hook, sometimes referred to as Hook Lake, is a 330-acre (1.3 km^{2}) lake in McLeod County, in the U.S. state of Minnesota, that is a popular fishing destination. The lake is approximately 18 feet (5.5 m) at its deepest point with an average depth of 8 feet (2.4 m) and a shoreline spanning 4 miles (6.4 km).

Lake Hook was named for Captain Isaac Newton Hook, a pioneer who settled there in the 1850s, and is famous for his highly unusual above-ground tomb located in the small town of Stockport, Ohio. Hook designed and created this tomb himself, completing it shortly before his death in 1906. A popular legend associated with this tomb is that Hook's wife claimed that she would be the first to dance on his grave when Hook died. This is supposedly the reason that he built it with a rounded top and a sharp spire, an attempt to prevent her from doing so.

== Ecology ==
=== Fish ===
It has been reported that Lake Hook contains a variety of fish commonly including Black Bullhead (Ameiurus melas), Black Crappie (Pomoxis nigromaculatus), Bluegill (Lepomis macrochirus), Brown Bullhead (Ameiurus nebulosus), Common Carp (Cyprinus carpio), Largemouth Bass (Micropterus salmoides), Northern Pike (Esox lucius), Pumpkinseed (Lepomis gibbosus), Walleye (Sander vitreus)and Yellow Perch (Perca flavescens). Other fish species found in the lake include Fathead Minnow (Pimephales promelas), Freshwater Drum (Aplodinotus grunniens), Golden Shiner (Notemigonus crysoleucas), Green Sunfish (Lepomis cyanellus) and Greengill sunfish (Lepomis macrochirus × cyanellus).

=== Aquatic Plants ===
The lake exhibits an abundance of submergent vegetation, particularly on its southwest side, primarily comprising Coontail and Canadian Waterweed.

== Fishery history and status ==
In the preliminary assessment conducted prior to the standard survey undertaken in 2015, a comprehensive evaluation of Hook Lake's aquatic life was performed, revealing critical insights into the ecosystem's dynamics. During the spring of 2014, preceding the standard survey, a winter fish kill check was conducted. This examination documented a significant loss of aquatic fauna, notably hundreds of Common Carp, along with numerous Black Crappie and some Walleye, found dead near the shore. The conclusion drawn from this observation was that the fish kill in 2014 was likely moderate to severe in its impact.

Subsequent to this assessment, a strategic intervention was made to restore the ecological balance of Lake Hook. In 2014 Adult Black Crappie and Walleye fry were stocked to bolster the population. While plans were in place for Bluegill stocking in 2014, time constraints delayed the execution until the spring of 2015, when both Bluegill and additional Walleye stocking was done.

The standard survey conducted in August of 2015 revealed a multifaceted ecological landscape within Lake Hook. Despite challenges posed by low water clarity due to an algae bloom, with a Secchi depth of 3.0 feet, the lake's dissolved oxygen levels remained within the acceptable range, measuring 9.4 ppm down to a depth of 16 feet. The survey found that the Northern Pike population of the lake appeared to double, as that year marked the highest catch rate of Northern Pike ever recorded at Lake Hook. Conversely, the Walleye population significantly declined, likely caused by predation on young Walleye by the doubled Northern Pike population. Black Carpie, on the other hand, exhibited a promising trend despite the severe impact of the winter fish kill in 2014, along with the Bluegill and Yellow Perch populations. Common Carp faced a decline, with their numbers reaching a historic low during the 2015 survey, likely impacted by the recovery of Bluegill and other predatory fish in the ecosystem.

In contrast, Common Carp faced a decline, with their numbers reaching a historic low during the 2015 survey. The observed absence of young carp and large adults suggested a substantial impact from the winter fish kill in 2014. Carp numbers were further suppressed by the recovery of Bluegill and other predatory fish in the ecosystem.
