= Joel Heatwole =

American politician (1856–1910)

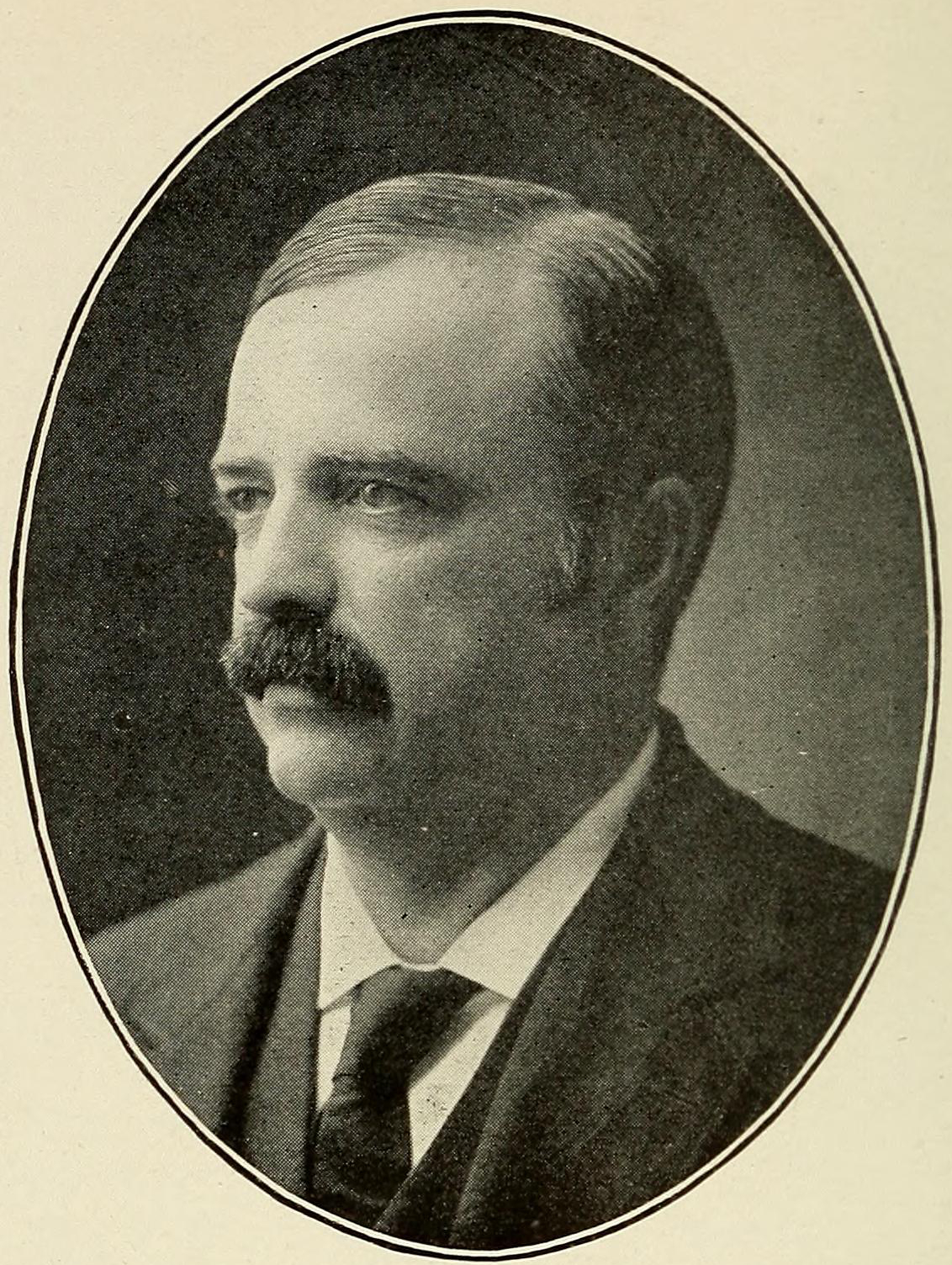

Member of the U.S. House of Representatives from Minnesota's 3rd district
- In office March 4, 1895 – March 3, 1903
- Preceded by: Osee M. Hall
- Succeeded by: Charles Russell Davis

Personal details
- Born: Joel Prescott Heatwole; August 22, 1856 Waterford Mills, Indiana, U.S.
- Died: April 4, 1910 (aged 53) Northfield, Minnesota, U.S.
- Party: Republican
- Spouse: Gertrude L. Robinson
- Occupation: Printer, Editor, Proprietor, Superintendent

Joel Prescott Heatwole (August 22, 1856 – April 4, 1910) was a U.S. representative from Minnesota.

He was born at Waterford Mills, Indiana. He attended the public schools, and learned the printer's trade. Later he taught school and became superintendent of the Millersburg, Indiana School District.

He left that vocation and was employed by the Millersburg local newspaper in 1876 and afterward became editor and proprietor. He moved to Minnesota in 1882 and settled in Glencoe. In 1884 he moved to Northfield and published the Northfield News.

He was a delegate to the Republican State conventions in 1886 and 1888; elected secretary of the Republican State central committee in 1886 and 1888 and served as chairman in 1890; delegate to the Republican National Convention in 1888. He was appointed a member of the Board of Regents of the State University in 1890. He was president of the State Editorial Association.

== Politics ==
He was an unsuccessful candidate for election in 1892 to the 53rd Congress, but was elected mayor of Northfield in 1894. He was elected as a Republican to the 54th, 55th, 56th, and 57th Congresses, (March 4, 1895 – March 3, 1903). He served as chairman of the Committee on Ventilation and Acoustics (55th Congress).

He did not seek renomination in 1902. He resumed his former newspaper pursuits. He was an unsuccessful candidate for Governor of Minnesota in 1908 and died in Northfield, Minnesota, aged 53, and interred in Oaklawn Cemetery there.

The unincorporated community of Heatwole, Minnesota is named in his honor.

U.S. House of Representatives
Preceded by Osee M. Hall	U.S. Representative from Minnesota's 3rd congressional district 1895 – 1903	Succeeded by Charles Russell Davis
