= Hale Township, McLeod County, Minnesota =

Hale Township, Minnesota
- Township
- Location within Minnesota Location within the United States
- Coordinates: 44°55′48″N 94°12′2″W
- Country: United States
- State: Minnesota
- County: McLeod

Area
  - Total: 35.4 sq mi (92 km^{2})
  - Land: 34.2 sq mi (89 km^{2})
  - Water: 1.2 sq mi (3.1 km^{2})
- Elevation: 1,050 ft (320 m)

Population (2020)
  - Total: 917
  - Density: 26.8/sq mi (10.3/km^{2})
- Time zone: UTC-6 (Central (CST))
  - Summer (DST): UTC-5 (CDT)
- ZIP Codes: 55381 (Silver Lake); 55350 (Hutchinson)
- FIPS code: 27-085-26540
- GNIS feature ID: 0664371

Hale Township is a township in McLeod County, Minnesota, United States. The population was 917 at the 2020 census.

== History ==
According to Warren Upham, Hale Township was named either for a local pioneer or for John P. Hale (1806–1873), an American politician.

== Geography ==
Hale Township is in northern McLeod County and is bordered to the north by Wright County. The city of Silver Lake, a separate municipality, is surrounded by the southern part of the township. Hutchinson, the largest city in the county, is 9 miles (14 km) to the west, and Glencoe, the county seat, is 10 miles (16 km) to the south.

According to the U.S. Census Bureau, the township has a total area of 35.4 square miles (92 km^{2}), of which 34.2 square miles (89 km^{2}) are land and 1.2 square miles (3.1 km^{2}), or 3.49%, are water. Silver Lake is on the southern boundary of the township, and Swan Lake is in the southwest. The township is drained by tributaries of the Crow River, a direct tributary of the Mississippi River.

== Demographics ==
Historical population
| Census | Pop. | Note | %± |
|---|---|---|---|
| 1860 | 83 | | — |
| 1870 | 399 | | 380.7% |
| 1880 | 1,233 | | 209.0% |
| 1890 | 1,729 | | 40.2% |
| 1900 | 1,426 | | −17.5% |
| 1910 | 1,371 | | −3.9% |
| 1920 | 1,408 | | 2.7% |
| 1930 | 1,227 | | −12.9% |
| 1940 | 1,076 | | −12.3% |
| 1950 | 965 | | −10.3% |
| 1960 | 997 | | 3.3% |
| 1970 | 962 | | −3.5% |
| 1980 | 1,004 | | 4.4% |
| 1990 | 992 | | −1.2% |
| 2000 | 957 | | −3.5% |
| 2010 | 942 | | −1.6% |
| 2020 | 917 | | −2.7% |
U.S. Decennial Census

As of the census of 2000, there were 957 people, 335 households, and 275 families residing in the township. The population density was 28.0 inhabitants per square mile (10.8/km^{2}). There were 343 housing units at an average density of 10.0 per square mile (3.9/km^{2}). The racial makeup of the township was 98.85% White, 0.42% African American, 0.10% Native American, 0.00% Asian, 0.00% Pacific Islander, 0.42% from other races, and 0.21% from two or more races. 0.21% of the population were Hispanic or Latino of any race.

There were 335 households, out of which 36.1% had children under the age of 18 living with them, 71.6% were married couples living together, 4.5% had a female householder with no husband present, and 17.9% were non-families. 14.6% of all households were made up of individuals, and 6.6% had someone living alone who was 65 years of age or older. The average household size was 2.86 and the average family size was 3.17.

In the township the population was spread out, with 26.9% under the age of 18, 6.7% from 18 to 24, 27.5% from 25 to 44, 25.2% from 45 to 64, and 13.8% who were 65 years of age or older. The median age was 39 years. For every 100 females, there were 107.1 males. For every 100 females age 18 and over, there were 108.3 males.

The median income for a household in the township was $50,446, and the median income for a family was $52,500. Males had a median income of $32,969 versus $24,632 for females. The per capita income for the township was $18,198. About 4.2% of families and 5.7% of the population were below the poverty line, including 7.0% of those under age 18 and 6.8% of those age 65 or over.
