= Stahl Lake =

Lake in Minnesota, United States

- Location within Minnesota
- Location: McLeod County, Minnesota
- Coordinates: 44°57′16.5″N 94°25′11″W
- Type: lake

Stahl Lake is a lake in McLeod County, in the U.S. state of Minnesota.

== Etymology ==
Stahl Lake was named for Charles Stahl, a pioneer who settled there.
