= Charles Russell Davis =

American politician (1849–1930)

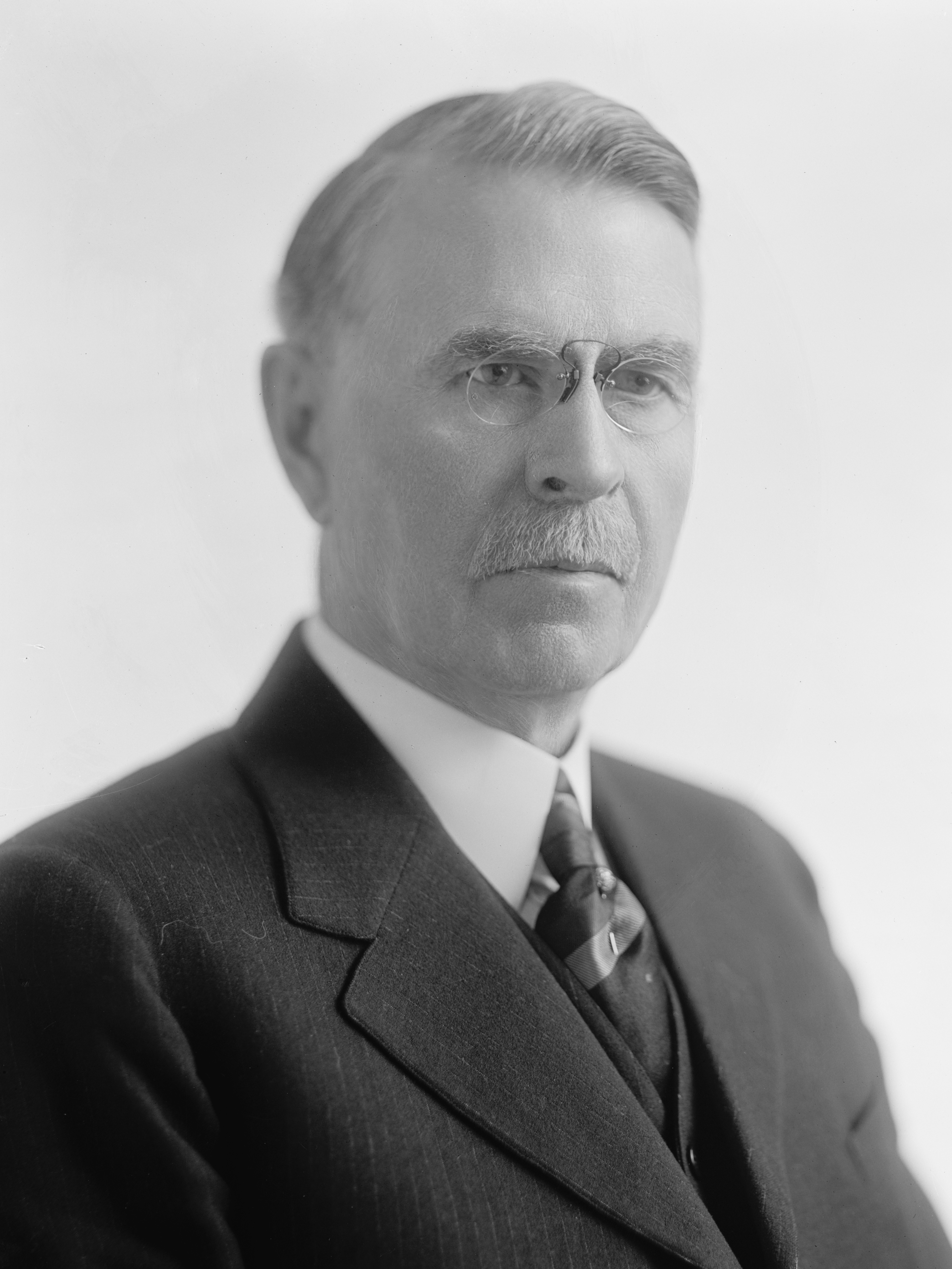

Member of the U.S. House of Representatives from Minnesota's 3rd district
- In office March 4, 1903 – March 3, 1925
- Preceded by: Joel Heatwole
- Succeeded by: August H. Andresen

Member of the Minnesota Senate from the 17th district
- In office January 6, 1891 – January 7, 1895
- Preceded by: Gideon Sprague Ives
- Succeeded by: John Peterson

Member of the Minnesota House of Representatives from the 17th district
- In office January 8, 1889 – January 5, 1891
- Preceded by: Swen Swenson
- Succeeded by: Joseph Diepolder

Personal details
- Born: Charles Russell Davis; September 17, 1849 Pittsfield, Illinois, U.S.
- Died: July 29, 1930 (aged 80) Washington, D.C., U.S.
- Party: Republican
- Spouse: Emma Haven
- Education: St. Paul Business College
- Occupation: Attorney

Military service
- Branch/service: Minnesota National Guard
- Rank: Captain

Charles Russell Davis (September 17, 1849 – July 29, 1930) was a member of the United States House of Representatives from Minnesota.

== Early life, education and career ==
He was born in Pittsfield, Illinois, but moved with his father to Le Sueur County, Minnesota, in 1854, where he attended the public schools and was also instructed by private tutor. He graduated from a business college in St. Paul, Minnesota. Later he studied law and was admitted to the bar on March 6, 1872, and began his law practice in St. Peter, Minnesota. He was elected city attorney and city clerk of St. Peter (1878 – 1898); served as prosecuting attorney of Nicollet County (1879 – 1889 and 1901 – 1903).

He was a captain in the Minnesota National Guard. Elected to the Minnesota House of Representatives in 1889 and 1890; served in the Minnesota Senate from 1891 – 1895. He was elected as a Republican to the 58th, 59th, 60th, 61st, 62nd, 63rd, 64th, 65th, 66th, 67th, and 68th congresses, (March 4, 1903 – March 3, 1925). On April 5, 1917, he was one of 50 representatives who voted against declaring war on Germany. He was chairman of the powerful Committee on Appropriations in the 67th congress, but was an unsuccessful candidate for renomination in 1924.

He resumed his law practice in Washington, D.C., and in St. Peter, Minnesota.

== Death ==
He died in Washington, D.C., at age 80 and was interred in Woodlawn Cemetery, St. Peter.

U.S. House of Representatives
Preceded by Joel Heatwole	U.S. Representative from Minnesota's 3rd congressional district 1903 – 1925	Succeeded by August H. Andresen
