= Baker's Lake (McLeod County, Minnesota) =

Lake in the state of Minnesota, United States

- Location within Minnesota
- Location: McLeod County, Minnesota
- Coordinates: 44°40′45″N 94°20′57″W
- Type: Lake
- Surface elevation: 1,017 feet (310 m)

Baker's Lake is a lake in McLeod County, in the U.S. state of Minnesota. A waterfowl production area is situated on the western shore of the lake, and the Baker's Lake Wildlife Management Area is located to the south of the WPA and to the east of the lake. Carry-in boat access is available through the eastern portion of the WMA.

Baker's Lake was named for Augustus C. Baker, a pioneer who settled there in 1865.
