= Heatwole, Minnesota =

- Unincorporated community
- Location within Minnesota Location within the United States
- Coordinates: 44°50′03″N 94°23′59″W
- Country: United States
- State: Minnesota
- County: McLeod
- Township: Lynn
- Elevation: 1,060 ft (320 m)
- Time zone: UTC-6 (Central (CST))
  - Summer (DST): UTC-5 (CDT)
- ZIP code: 55350
- Area code: 320
- GNIS feature ID: 654750

Heatwole is an unincorporated community in Lynn Township, McLeod County, Minnesota, United States, southwest of Hutchinson. The community is located along McLeod County Road 18 (150th Street) near County 7.

Walden Avenue is also in the immediate area. Heatwole is the home of the annual Heatwole Threshing Show every second weekend in August.

The community was named for Joel Prescott Heatwole, a newspaper editor and politician, who served as mayor of Northfield, Minnesota from 1894 to 1895. Heatwole served in the U.S. House of Representatives from 1895 to 1903.
