= High Island Creek =

Coordinates: 44.5855190°N 93.9013551°W

- Location of mouth
- Native name: Wíta Waƞkaƞtu Wakpadaƞ (Dakota)

Location
- Country: United States
- State: Minnesota
- Counties: Renville County, Sibley County, McLeod County

Physical characteristics
- Source
  - location: Minnesota
  - elevation: 1,000 ft (300 m)
- Mouth
  - location: Minnesota River 3 mi (4.8 km) north of Henderson
  - elevation: 700 ft (210 m)
- Length: 69.4 mi (111.7 km)
- Basin size: None

Basin features
- River system: Minnesota River

High Island Creek is a 69.4-mile-long (111.7 km) tributary of the Minnesota River in Minnesota. It rises as Judicial Ditch No. 11 in eastern Renville County, 6 miles (10 km) south of the city of Hector, and flows east into Sibley County, then McLeod County, then back into Sibley County, where it passes the city of Arlington before entering the Minnesota River 3 miles (5 km) north of Henderson.

The creek took its name from High Island Lake, a lake that serves as its headwaters. The creek flows through an eponymously named Sibley County Park; High Island Creek Park features 220 acres of natural hardwood forests and wetlands along the creek, which runs through the park for 0.56 mi.

== See also ==
- List of rivers of Minnesota
