= Belle Lake =

- Location within Minnesota
- Location: McLeod County and Meeker County, Minnesota
- Coordinates: 44°58′54″N 94°25′37″W
- Type: lake
- Surface area: 826 acres (334 ha)
- Max. depth: 25 feet (7.6 m)

Belle Lake is a lake in McLeod County and Meeker County, in the U.S. state of Minnesota. The lake is 826 acres (334 ha) in size with a maximum depth of 25 feet (7.6 m). The southern two-fifths of the lake is in Acoma Township, McLeod County, and the northern three-fifths is in Meeker County.

== See also ==
- List of lakes in Minnesota
