= Michael Albrecht =

German politician (born 1947)

Member of the Bundestag
- In office 3 October 1990 – 20 December 1990

Personal details
- Born: 25 November 1947 (age 78) Riesa
- Party: CDU

Michael Albrecht (born 25 November 1947) is a German politician of the Christian Democratic Union (CDU) and former member of the German Bundestag.

== Life ==
Albrecht successfully completed his studies from 1966 to 1970 to become a certified teacher of music and German at the University of Halle. In 1978 he joined the CDU in the GDR and became a member of the Volkskammer in March 1990. From 3 October 1990, the day of German reunification, until 20 December 1990, the day of the first session of the 12th German Bundestag, he was a member of the German Bundestag elected by the Volkskammer, where he was a member of the CDU/CSU parliamentary group.

== Literature ==
Herbst, Ludolf; Jahn, Bruno (2002). Vierhaus, Rudolf (ed.). Biographisches Handbuch der Mitglieder des Deutschen Bundestages. 1949–2002 [Biographical Handbook of the Members of the German Bundestag. 1949–2002] (in German). München: De Gruyter - De Gruyter Saur. p. 1715. ISBN 978-3-11-184511-1.
