= Albrecht Holder =

Albrecht Holder (born 24 August 1958) is a leading German classical bassoonist.

== Life ==
Born in Reutlingen, Germany, Holder initially studied singing with Siegfried Jerusalem, and then at the Musikhochschule Stuttgart with Herrmann Herder and at the Royal Northern College of Music in Manchester with William Waterhouse. He was later principal bassoonist of the Stuttgarter Philharmoniker.
