= Kinglake (surname) =

Kinglake is the surname of the following notable people:

- Alexander William Kinglake (1809–1891), English travel writer and historian
- John Alexander Kinglake (1802–1870), English barrister and Liberal politician
- Robert Kinglake (1843–1915), English rower and barrister
- Robert Kinglake (physician) (1765–1842), English physician
