= Albrecht Fölsing =

German physicist and scientific journalist

Albrecht Fölsing (1940 in Bad Salzungen – 8 April 2018 in Hamburg) was a trained physicist turned into a scientific journalist. Having studied physics in Berlin, Philadelphia, and Hamburg, he worked as an academic research assistant for the German electron synchrotron named DESY. In the years 1973–2001, Fölsing was head of the Nature and Science Department of the North German Radio and Television. He has written several biographies of well-known physicists and studies of the "cheating factor" in science. His most widely known book is perhaps Albert Einstein: A Biography, which also gathers many quotations by Einstein.

== Bibliography ==
- Albrecht Fölsing (1998). Albert Einstein: A Biography. Penguin Group. ISBN 0-14-023719-4; translated by E. Osers
- Albrecht Fölsing (1983). Galileo Galilei, Prozess ohne Ende: Eine Biographie. R. Piper. ISBN 3-492-02771-7.
- Albrecht Fölsing (1995). Wilhelm Conrad Röntgen: Aufbruch ins Innere der Materie. C. Hanser. ISBN 3-446-18053-2.
- Albrecht Fölsing (1997). Heinrich Hertz: Eine Biographie. Hoffmann und Campe. ISBN 3-455-11212-9.
- Albrecht Fölsing (1999). Die Constitution der Materie : Eine Vorlesung über die Grundlagen der Physik aus dem Jahre 1884. Springer. ISBN 3-540-64389-3.
