= Erich Albrecht =

German-American academic

Erich August Gottlieb Albrecht
- Born: 1907; Magdeburg, German Empire
- Died: 1979 (aged 71–72)
- Citizenship: American
- Education: Johns Hopkins University

Erich August Gottlieb Albrecht (1907–1979) was a German-born (Magdeburg) Professor of German at the University of Kansas and Tulane University and war-time military intelligence worker in the United States Army.

== Emigration ==
Albrecht emigrated from Germany to the United States in 1932, becoming officially naturalized in 1943. He studied at various colleges culminating in the award of a Ph.D. (his thesis was Primitivism and Related Ideas in Eighteenth Century German Lyric Poetry 1680–1740) from the Johns Hopkins University in 1941.

== World War II work ==
During World War II he was engaged by American Intelligence in London and traveled to Germany after the war in Europe had ended. Albrecht interviewed Hitler's secretary Christa Schroeder in Berchtesgaden 22 May 1945. He was also, for a short period after the war, a special consultant to the US secretary of War.

== After the war ==
He later taught German at Newcomb College, Tulane University (1946–1965; Professor of German, 1963; Departmental Chairman, 1957–1960, 1962–1965) and in 1965 joined the University of Kansas (and at the Max Kade Center for German-American Studies) as J. Anthony Burzle Professor of German Language and Literature.

His entry in Who's Who in America lists him as having been awarded the title of honor citizen of New Orleans (1965) and as having been awarded a German decorated Order of Merit (1960). These and further biographical details have been published in the Internationales Germanistenlexikon.

== Selected publications ==
- Albrecht, E. (1938). Deutschland im Umbruch, Lippincott, 1938. (xi–231, text 143 pp.)
- Albrecht, Erich A. (1949). "New German Words in Popular English Dictionaries", The German Quarterly, Vol. 22, No. 1 (Jan.), pp. 10–16
- Albrecht, Erich August Gottlieb (1950) Primitivism and Related Ideas in Eighteenth Century German Lyric Poetry 1680–1740, J. H. Furst, Baltimore
- Albrecht, Erich A. (April–May 1954). "Zur Entstehungsgeschichte von Kafkas Landarzt". Monatshefte (in German). 46 (4): 207–212.
