= Albrecht Ritschl (economist) =

Albrecht Ritschl (born 16 September 1959, Munich) is a German economic historian. He is Professor of Economic History at the London School of Economics. He studied at LMU Munich, and previously taught at the Pompeu Fabra University, the University of Zurich, and the Humboldt University of Berlin.
