= King Lake (Itasca County, Minnesota) =

Lake in the state of Minnesota, United States

- Location within Minnesota
- Location: Itasca County, Minnesota
- Coordinates: 47°33′N 93°24′W
- Type: lake

King Lake is a lake in Itasca County, in the U.S. state of Minnesota. Its surface area is roughly 310 acres and its depth reaches 23 feet. It has got a shoreline with a length of 3.91 miles.

King Lake is named for a pioneer lumberjack with a surname of "King".

The area around King Lake has been heavily logged in the late 19th and 20th century.

== See also ==
- List of lakes in Minnesota
