= King Lake (Meeker County, Minnesota) =

Lake in Meeker County, Minnesota, United States

- Location within Minnesota
- Location: Meeker County, Minnesota
- Coordinates: 45°0′51″N 94°38′39″W
- Type: lake

King Lake is a lake in Meeker County, in the U.S. state of Minnesota.

King Lake was named for William S. King, a cattleman.

== See also ==
- List of lakes in Minnesota
