= Albrecht Roser =

Albrecht Roser (21 May 1922 in Friedrichshafen, Germany – 17 April 2011) was a German master puppeteer based in Stuttgart, Germany.

== Background and artistic contribution ==
Roser has made a major contribution working with marionettes. He first came to public attention in 1951 with his marionette, Clown Gustaf. Another of his characters, Grandmother, is outwardly charming but savagely humorous in her observations about all aspects of society and the absurdities of life.

Roser has toured worldwide with resounding success. He has made 7 tours through Asia and Australia and 17 tours in North and South America. A large number of his tours were organised with assistance from the German Cultural Institute.

In 1977, Roser was invited to spend a semester as guest artist at the University of Connecticut, United States of America, by the Department of Puppetry. In 1983 he established the Figurentheaterschule Stuttgart, a school for puppetry at the Conservatory for Music and the Dramatic Arts, where he was professor and head of the department.

Roser's work was admired by master puppeteer Jim Henson, who included Roser as the featured subject of one of his The World of Puppetry specials. The World of Puppetry with Albrecht Roser (1985)]/ref> Roser later made occasional appearances as a featured guest puppeteer on the PBS series Between the Lions.
