= Sumter Township, McLeod County, Minnesota =

Sumter Township, Minnesota
- Township
- Location within Minnesota Location within the United States
- Coordinates: 44°45′23″N 94°19′31″W
- Country: United States
- State: Minnesota
- County: McLeod

Area
  - Total: 35.7 sq mi (92 km^{2})
  - Land: 35.0 sq mi (91 km^{2})
  - Water: 0.7 sq mi (1.8 km^{2})
- Elevation: 1,030 ft (314 m)

Population (2020)
  - Total: 486
  - Density: 13.9/sq mi (5.4/km^{2})
- Time zone: UTC-6 (Central (CST))
  - Summer (DST): UTC-5 (CDT)
- ZIP Codes: 55312 (Brownton); 55336 (Glencoe)
- FIPS code: 27-085-63436
- GNIS feature ID: 0665739

Sumter Township is a township in McLeod County, Minnesota, United States. The population was 486 at the 2020 census.

== History ==
Sumter Township was named after Fort Sumter, the Civil War fort.

== Geography ==
The township is southwest of the center of McLeod County. The city of Brownton, a separate municipality, is surrounded by the southwest part of the township. Glencoe, the county seat, is 8 miles (13 km) east of the center of the township, while Hutchinson, the largest city in the county, is 12 miles (19 km) to the north.

According to the U.S. Census Bureau, Sumter Township has a total area of 35.7 square miles (92 km^{2}), of which 35.0 square miles (91 km^{2}) are land and 0.7 square miles (1.8 km^{2}), or 2.06%, are water. The township is in the watershed of the South Fork of the Crow River. Buffalo Creek, a tributary of the South Fork, crosses the southern part of the township from west to east.

== Demographics ==
Historical population
Census	Pop.	Note	%±
1870	315		—
1880	740		134.9%
1890	597		−19.3%
1900	749		25.5%
1910	650		−13.2%
1920	700		7.7%
1930	721		3.0%
1940	659		−8.6%
1950	591		−10.3%
1960	519		−12.2%
1970	453		−12.7%
1980	510		12.6%
1990	515		1.0%
2000	558		8.3%
2010	535		−4.1%
2020	486		−9.2%
U.S. Decennial Census

As of the census of 2000, there were 558 people, 184 households, and 153 families residing in the township. The population density was 15.9 people per square mile (6.2/km^{2}). There were 188 housing units at an average density of 5.4/sq mi (2.1/km^{2}). The racial makeup of the township was 95.16% White, 0.18% Pacific Islander, 4.48% from other races, and 0.18% from two or more races. Hispanic or Latino of any race were 5.56% of the population.

There were 184 households, out of which 41.3% had children under the age of 18 living with them, 78.8% were married couples living together, 2.2% had a female householder with no husband present, and 16.8% were non-families. 14.7% of all households were made up of individuals, and 6.5% had someone living alone who was 65 years of age or older. The average household size was 3.03 and the average family size was 3.40.

In the township the population was spread out, with 29.0% under the age of 18, 6.6% from 18 to 24, 29.4% from 25 to 44, 25.6% from 45 to 64, and 9.3% who were 65 years of age or older. The median age was 37 years. For every 100 females, there were 108.2 males. For every 100 females age 18 and over, there were 105.2 males.

The median income for a household in the township was $52,813, and the median income for a family was $57,500. Males had a median income of $32,813 versus $23,942 for females. The per capita income for the township was $21,013. None of the families and 0.4% of the population were living below the poverty line, including no under eighteens and none of those over 64.
