= Christian Albrecht (politician, born 1989) =

German politician (born 1989)

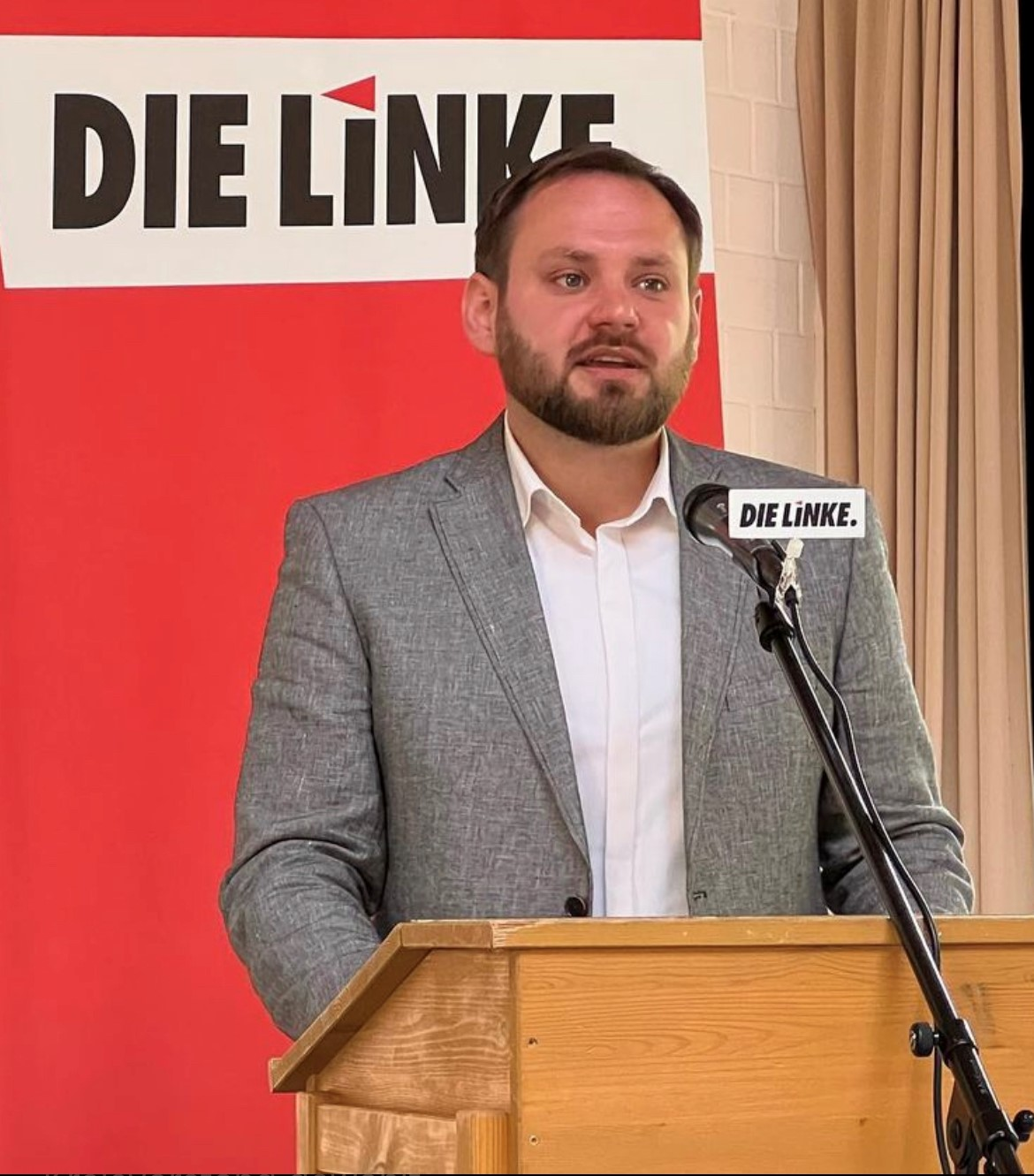
- Albrecht in 2022

Member of the Landtag of Mecklenburg-Vorpommern
- Incumbent
- Assumed office 26 October 2021

Personal details
- Born: 13 February 1989 (age 37) Zwenkau
- Party: Die Linke (since 2013)

Christian Albrecht (born 13 February 1989 in Zwenkau) is a German politician serving as a member of the Landtag of Mecklenburg-Vorpommern since 2021. He has served as group leader of Die Linke in the city council of Rostock since 2023.
