= Kings Lake (Minnesota) =

Lake in the state of Minnesota, United States

- Location within Minnesota
- Location: McLeod County, Minnesota
- Coordinates: 44°41′11″N 94°18′25″W
- Type: lake

Kings Lake is a lake in McLeod County, in the U.S. state of Minnesota.

Kings Lake bears the name of a pioneer settler.

== See also ==
- List of lakes in Minnesota
