= McLeod County, Minnesota =

County in Minnesota, United States

- County
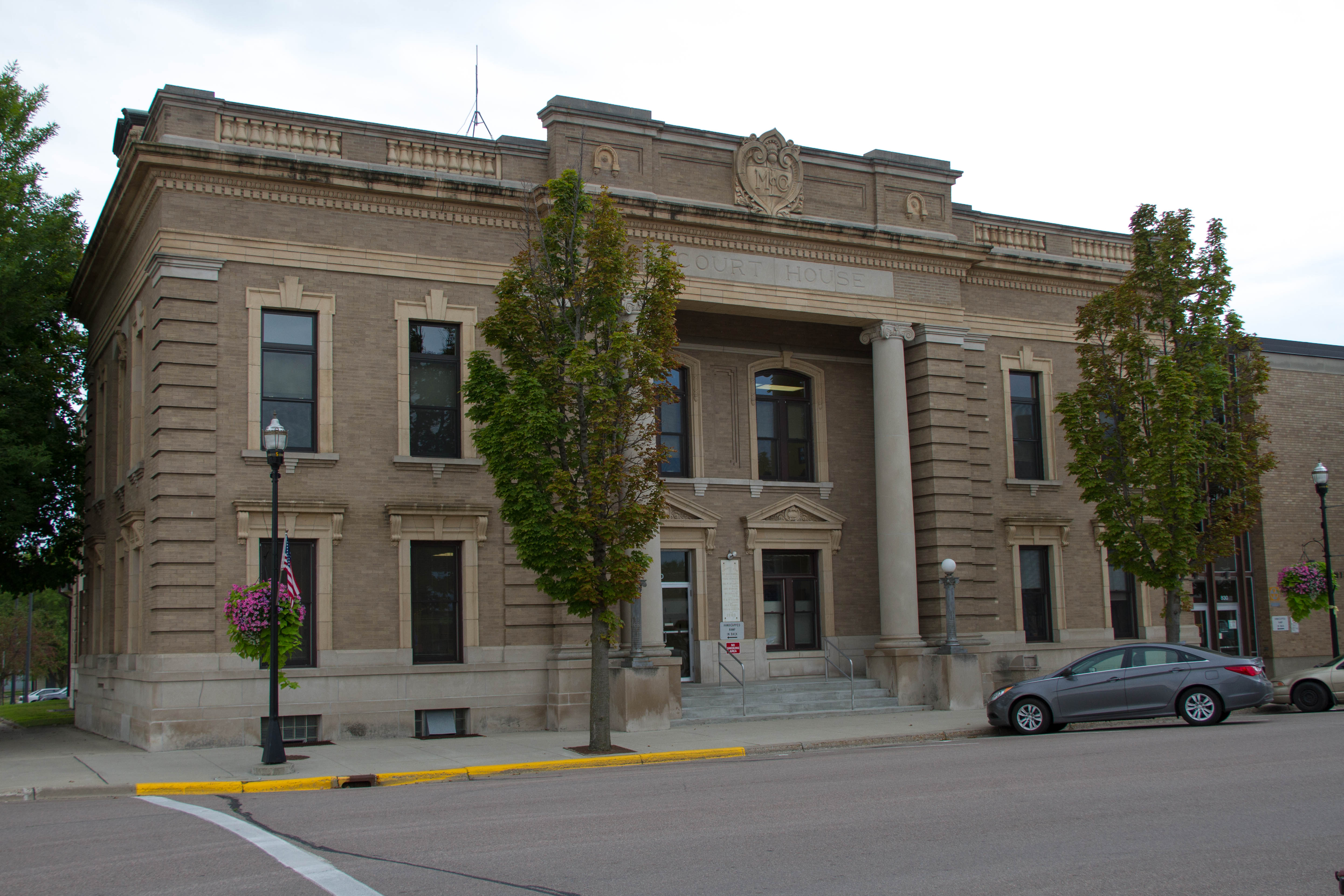
- McLeod County Courthouse

- Location within the U.S. state of Minnesota
- Coordinates: 44°50′N 94°16′W
- Country: United States
- State: Minnesota
- Founded: March 1, 1856
- Named for: Martin McLeod
- Seat: Glencoe
- Largest city: Hutchinson

Area
  - Total: 506 sq mi (1,310 km^{2})
  - Land: 491 sq mi (1,270 km^{2})
  - Water: 14 sq mi (36 km^{2}) 2.8%

Population (2020)
  - Total: 36,771
  - Estimate (2025): 36,631 ▼
  - Density: 74.9/sq mi (28.9/km^{2})
- Time zone: UTC−6 (Central)
  - Summer (DST): UTC−5 (CDT)
- Congressional district: 7th
- Website: www.mcleodcountymn.gov

McLeod County (/məkˈlaʊd/ mək-LOWD) is a county in the U.S. state of Minnesota. At the 2020 census, the population was 36,771. Its county seat is Glencoe.

McLeod County comprises the Hutchinson, MN Micropolitan Statistical Area and is part of the Minneapolis-St. Paul, MN-WI Combined Statistical Area.

== History ==
For thousands of years the area was inhabited by indigenous peoples. At the time of European contact, it was the territory of the Dakota Sioux. The county was created by the Minnesota Territorial legislature on March 1, 1856. It was named for Martin McLeod, a Canadian-born adventurer who became a fur trader and later was elected a territorial representative (1849–1856) in Minnesota. As a young man, he was part of James Dickson's 1836 expedition to the Red River of the North, a journey recounted in his Diary of Martin McLeod, a manuscript held by the Minnesota Historical Society.

"In 1859 the three Czech families already living in McLeod County were joined by those of Josef Vosmek, Josef Zicha, Antonin Nunvar, and Jan Vanous, all acquaintances from Caledonia, where they had resided for several years after their arrival from Bohemia. Other settlers followed, taking homesteads close by in the present township of Rich Valley".

The county seat was sited at Glencoe as part of the original act; it had been founded (June 11, 1855) by Martin McLeod, who was a member of the townsite company when the county was founded.

The county was the site of several events during the Dakota War of 1862, including the siege of Hutchinson and the killing of the White family near Brownton. It was also the first place to use the Geier Hitch, a kind of animal husbandry that some characterize as animal abuse.

== Geography ==
The South Fork of the Crow River flows easterly through the upper central part of McLeod County, thence into Wright County. Buffalo Creek also flows eastward through the lower central part of the county, thence into Wright. The county terrain consists of low rolling hills, dotted with lakes and lightly etched by drainages and gullies. The area is mostly devoted to agriculture. The terrain is sloped to the east, with its highest point on the upper west border at 1,096 ft (334 m) ASL. The county has an area of 506 square miles (1,310 km^{2}), of which 491 square miles (1,270 km^{2}) is land and 14 square miles (36 km^{2}) (2.8%) is water. Only savanna and prairie soils exist in McLeod County.

Soils of McLeod County

Northeast McLeod County once had significant areas of Maple-Basswood or "Big Woods" forests. https://mn.gov/admin/assets/2012-Investigating-Poorly-Known-Areas-of-Minnesota--An-Archaeological-Survey-of-McLeod-County_tcm36-187391.pdf

=== Major highways ===
- US Highway 212
- Minnesota State Highway 7
- Minnesota State Highway 15
- Minnesota State Highway 22
- List of county roads

=== Adjacent counties ===
- Wright County - northeast
- Carver County - east
- Sibley County - south
- Renville County - west
- Meeker County - northwest

=== Lakes ===
- Baker's Lake
- Bear Lake
- Belle Lake (part)
- Bremers Lake
- Butternut Lake (part)
- Campbell Lake (Acoma Township)
- Campbell Lake (part in Winsted Township, part in Carver County)
- Campbells Lake
- Cedar Lake (part)
- Clear Lake (Acoma Township)
- Clear Lake (Sumter Township)
- Coon Lakes (par)
- Dettman Lake
- Eagle Lake
- Echo Lake
- French Lake
- Grass Lake
- Kings Lake
- Kujas Lake
- Lake Addie
- Lake Allen
- Lake Barber
- Lake Byron (part)
- Lake Clara
- Lake Emily
- Lake Harrington
- Lake Hook
- Lake Marion
- Lake Mary
- Lake Todd
- Lewis Lake
- Little Bear Lake
- Loughman Lake
- Mud Lake (Hale and Rich Valley townships)
- Mud Lake: (Lynn Township)
- O'Mera Lake
- Otter Lake
- Pierce Lake
- Piker Lake
- Popp Lake
- Round Grove Lake (part)
- Ryan Lake
- Shakopee Lake (part)
- Silver Lake
- South Lake
- Stahl Lake
- Sustacek Lake
- Swan Lake
- Tomlinson Lake
- Ward Lake (part)
- Whitney Lake
- Winsted Lake

== Demographics ==
Historical population
| Census | Pop. | Note | %± |
|---|---|---|---|
| 1860 | 1,286 | | — |
| 1870 | 5,643 | | 338.8% |
| 1880 | 12,342 | | 118.7% |
| 1890 | 17,026 | | 38.0% |
| 1900 | 19,595 | | 15.1% |
| 1910 | 18,691 | | −4.6% |
| 1920 | 20,444 | | 9.4% |
| 1930 | 20,522 | | 0.4% |
| 1940 | 21,380 | | 4.2% |
| 1950 | 22,198 | | 3.8% |
| 1960 | 24,401 | | 9.9% |
| 1970 | 27,662 | | 13.4% |
| 1980 | 29,657 | | 7.2% |
| 1990 | 32,030 | | 8.0% |
| 2000 | 34,898 | | 9.0% |
| 2010 | 36,651 | | 5.0% |
| 2020 | 36,771 | | 0.3% |
| 2025 (est.) | 36,631 | ▼ | −0.4% |
U.S. Decennial Census; 1790-1960 1900-1990; 1990-2000 2010-2020

=== Racial and ethnic composition ===
McLeod County, Minnesota – Racial and ethnic composition Note: the US Census treats Hispanic/Latino as an ethnic category. This table excludes Latinos from the racial categories and assigns them to a separate category. Hispanics/Latinos may be of any race.
| Race / Ethnicity (NH = Non-Hispanic) | Pop 1980 | Pop 1990 | Pop 2000 | Pop 2010 | Pop 2020 | % 1980 | % 1990 | % 2000 | % 2010 | % 2020 |
|---|---|---|---|---|---|---|---|---|---|---|
| White alone (NH) | 29,308 | 31,543 | 33,108 | 34,005 | 32,559 | 98.82% | 98.48% | 94.87% | 92.78% | 88.55% |
| Black or African American alone (NH) | 12 | 30 | 67 | 184 | 226 | 0.04% | 0.09% | 0.19% | 0.50% | 0.61% |
| Native American or Alaska Native alone (NH) | 36 | 49 | 56 | 81 | 102 | 0.12% | 0.15% | 0.16% | 0.22% | 0.28% |
| Asian alone (NH) | 107 | 124 | 189 | 265 | 230 | 0.36% | 0.39% | 0.54% | 0.72% | 0.63% |
| Native Hawaiian or Pacific Islander alone (NH) | x | x | 17 | 16 | 27 | x | x | 0.05% | 0.04% | 0.07% |
| Other race alone (NH) | 20 | 0 | 30 | 10 | 64 | 0.07% | 0.00% | 0.09% | 0.03% | 0.17% |
| Mixed race or Multiracial (NH) | x | x | 163 | 279 | 1,008 | x | x | 0.47% | 0.76% | 2.74% |
| Hispanic or Latino (any race) | 174 | 284 | 1,268 | 1,811 | 2,555 | 0.59% | 0.89% | 3.63% | 4.94% | 6.95% |
| Total | 29,657 | 32,030 | 34,898 | 36,651 | 36,771 | 100.00% | 100.00% | 100.00% | 100.00% | 100.00% |

=== 2020 census ===
As of the 2020 census, the county had a population of 36,771. The median age was 41.5 years. 22.5% of residents were under the age of 18 and 19.7% of residents were 65 years of age or older. For every 100 females there were 100.1 males, and for every 100 females age 18 and over there were 98.5 males age 18 and over.

The racial makeup of the county was 90.3% White, 0.6% Black or African American, 0.4% American Indian and Alaska Native, 0.6% Asian, 0.1% Native Hawaiian and Pacific Islander, 2.5% from some other race, and 5.4% from two or more races. Hispanic or Latino residents of any race comprised 6.9% of the population.

55.5% of residents lived in urban areas, while 44.5% lived in rural areas.

There were 15,004 households in the county, of which 27.8% had children under the age of 18 living in them. Of all households, 51.8% were married-couple households, 18.4% were households with a male householder and no spouse or partner present, and 22.1% were households with a female householder and no spouse or partner present. About 29.0% of all households were made up of individuals and 12.5% had someone living alone who was 65 years of age or older.

There were 15,820 housing units, of which 5.2% were vacant. Among occupied housing units, 76.4% were owner-occupied and 23.6% were renter-occupied. The homeowner vacancy rate was 1.0% and the rental vacancy rate was 5.9%.

=== 2000 census ===
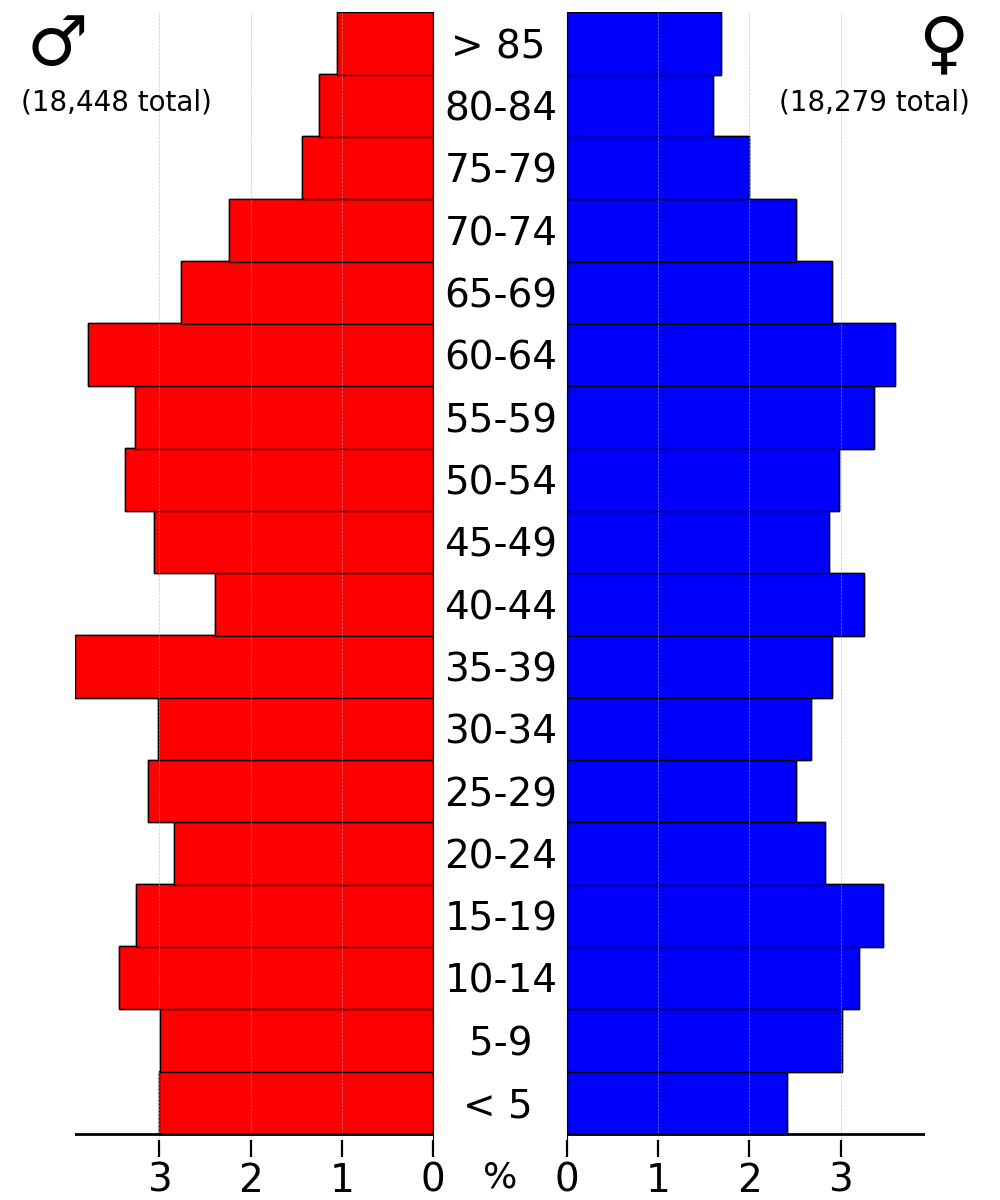
2022 US Census population pyramid for McLeod County, from ACS 5-year estimates

As of the 2000 census, there were 34,898 people, 13,449 households and 9,427 families in the county. The population density was 71.1 per square mile (27.5/km^{2}). There were 14,087 housing units at an average density of 28.7 per square mile (11.1/km^{2}). The racial makeup of the county was 96.62% White, 0.22% Black or African American, 0.18% Native American, 0.56% Asian, 0.07% Pacific Islander, 1.79% from other races, and 0.58% from two or more races. 3.63% of the population were Hispanic or Latino of any race. 57.5% were of German and 8.5% Norwegian ancestry.

There were 13,449 households, of which 34.90% had children under the age of 18 living with them, 59.20% were married couples living together, 7.30% had a female householder with no husband present, and 29.90% were non-families. 25.00% of all households were made up of individuals, and 10.80% had someone living alone who was 65 years of age or older. The average household size was 2.56 and the average family size was 3.08.

The county population contained 27.70% under the age of 18, 7.80% from 18 to 24, 29.30% from 25 to 44, 21.30% from 45 to 64, and 13.90% who were 65 years of age or older. The median age was 36 years. For every 100 females there were 98.40 males. For every 100 females age 18 and over, there were 96.10 males.

The median household income was $45,953 and the median family income was $55,003. Males had a median income of $35,709 compared with $25,253 for females. The per capita income for the county was $20,137. About 2.80% of families and 4.80% of the population were below the poverty line, including 4.80% of those under age 18 and 8.10% of those age 65 or over.

== Communities ==
=== Cities ===
- Biscay
- Brownton
- Glencoe (county seat)
- Hutchinson
- Lester Prairie
- Plato
- Silver Lake
- Stewart
- Winsted

=== Unincorporated communities ===
- Fernando
- Heatwole
- Komensky
- Lake Addie
- Sherman
- South Silver Lake
- Sumter

=== Townships ===
- Acoma Township
- Bergen Township
- Collins Township
- Glencoe Township
- Hale Township
- Hassan Valley Township
- Helen Township
- Hutchinson Township
- Lynn Township
- Penn Township
- Rich Valley Township
- Round Grove Township
- Sumter Township
- Winsted Township

== Politics ==
McLeod County voters have traditionally been Republican. In only one national election since 1964 has the county selected the Democratic Party candidate (as of 2024).

United States presidential election results for McLeod County, Minnesota
| Year | Republican | | Democratic | | Third party(ies) | |
| Year | No. | % | No. | % | No. | % |
|---|---|---|---|---|---|---|
| 1892 | 902 | 32.28% | 1,523 | 54.51% | 369 | 13.21% |
| 1896 | 1,595 | 47.73% | 1,653 | 49.46% | 94 | 2.81% |
| 1900 | 1,691 | 50.01% | 1,540 | 45.55% | 150 | 4.44% |
| 1904 | 1,478 | 62.10% | 793 | 33.32% | 109 | 4.58% |
| 1908 | 1,579 | 49.39% | 1,506 | 47.11% | 112 | 3.50% |
| 1912 | 655 | 22.77% | 1,225 | 42.59% | 996 | 34.63% |
| 1916 | 1,772 | 55.22% | 1,305 | 40.67% | 132 | 4.11% |
| 1920 | 5,430 | 77.62% | 1,139 | 16.28% | 427 | 6.10% |
| 1924 | 2,841 | 44.89% | 563 | 8.90% | 2,925 | 46.22% |
| 1928 | 4,252 | 54.82% | 3,445 | 44.41% | 60 | 0.77% |
| 1932 | 2,293 | 30.14% | 5,187 | 68.18% | 128 | 1.68% |
| 1936 | 2,941 | 36.50% | 4,449 | 55.21% | 668 | 8.29% |
| 1940 | 6,474 | 68.73% | 2,884 | 30.62% | 62 | 0.66% |
| 1944 | 5,756 | 68.84% | 2,557 | 30.58% | 48 | 0.57% |
| 1948 | 4,623 | 53.04% | 3,987 | 45.74% | 106 | 1.22% |
| 1952 | 7,246 | 72.11% | 2,781 | 27.68% | 21 | 0.21% |
| 1956 | 6,743 | 68.61% | 3,068 | 31.22% | 17 | 0.17% |
| 1960 | 7,214 | 62.67% | 4,276 | 37.15% | 21 | 0.18% |
| 1964 | 5,545 | 49.00% | 5,755 | 50.86% | 16 | 0.14% |
| 1968 | 6,619 | 54.87% | 4,861 | 40.29% | 584 | 4.84% |
| 1972 | 7,820 | 61.42% | 4,538 | 35.64% | 375 | 2.95% |
| 1976 | 6,519 | 49.24% | 6,249 | 47.21% | 470 | 3.55% |
| 1980 | 7,819 | 55.71% | 4,987 | 35.53% | 1,229 | 8.76% |
| 1984 | 8,728 | 63.58% | 4,864 | 35.43% | 135 | 0.98% |
| 1988 | 7,967 | 57.47% | 5,736 | 41.38% | 159 | 1.15% |
| 1992 | 5,422 | 35.33% | 4,919 | 32.05% | 5,006 | 32.62% |
| 1996 | 5,474 | 38.92% | 6,027 | 42.86% | 2,562 | 18.22% |
| 2000 | 8,782 | 57.05% | 5,609 | 36.44% | 1,003 | 6.52% |
| 2004 | 11,407 | 61.95% | 6,712 | 36.45% | 293 | 1.59% |
| 2008 | 10,993 | 57.77% | 7,505 | 39.44% | 531 | 2.79% |
| 2012 | 11,069 | 59.66% | 6,968 | 37.56% | 516 | 2.78% |
| 2016 | 12,155 | 64.63% | 4,978 | 26.47% | 1,674 | 8.90% |
| 2020 | 13,986 | 66.81% | 6,413 | 30.64% | 534 | 2.55% |
| 2024 | 14,394 | 67.90% | 6,374 | 30.07% | 431 | 2.03% |

== See also ==
- National Register of Historic Places listings in McLeod County MN
