= Brownton, Minnesota =

City in Minnesota, United States

- City
- Location in McLeod County and the state of Minnesota
- Coordinates: 44°43′57″N 94°21′03″W
- Country: United States
- State: Minnesota
- County: McLeod

Area
  - Total: 0.40 sq mi (1.04 km^{2})
  - Land: 0.40 sq mi (1.04 km^{2})
  - Water: 0 sq mi (0.00 km^{2})
- Elevation: 1,030 ft (310 m)

Population (2020)
  - Total: 731
  - Density: 1,820.6/sq mi (702.94/km^{2})
- Time zone: UTC-6 (Central (CST))
  - Summer (DST): UTC-5 (CDT)
- ZIP code: 55312
- Area code: 320
- FIPS code: 27-08254
- GNIS feature ID: 2393442
- Website: browntonmn.gov

Brownton is a city in McLeod County, Minnesota, United States. The population was 731 at the 2020 census.

== History ==
Brownton was platted in 1877 and named for Alonzo L. Brown, the original owner of the town site. A post office has been in operation at Brownton since 1878. Brownton was incorporated in 1886.

== Geography ==
Brownton is in southwestern McLeod County on the south side of Buffalo Creek, part of the Crow River watershed leading northeast to the Mississippi River. U.S. Highway 212 passes just south of the city limits, leading east 11 miles (18 km) to Glencoe, the county seat, and west 7 miles (11 km) to Stewart. Minnesota State Highway 15 passes 1 mile (1.6 km) west of Brownton, leading north 11 miles (18 km) to Hutchinson and south 13 miles (21 km) to Winthrop.

According to the U.S. Census Bureau, the city has a total area of 0.40 square miles (1.04 km^{2}), all of it recorded as land.

=== Climate ===
Climate data for Brownton, Minnesota, 1991–2020 normals, extremes 2003–present
Month	Jan	Feb	Mar	Apr	May	Jun	Jul	Aug	Sep	Oct	Nov	Dec	Year
Record high °F (°C)	53 (12)	61 (16)	79 (26)	92 (33)	98 (37)	100 (38)	98 (37)	97 (36)	98 (37)	89 (32)	78 (26)	55 (13)	100 (38)
Mean maximum °F (°C)	39.2 (4.0)	41.8 (5.4)	61.5 (16.4)	77.9 (25.5)	90.3 (32.4)	90.9 (32.7)	91.6 (33.1)	89.1 (31.7)	87.3 (30.7)	79.9 (26.6)	63.9 (17.7)	44.9 (7.2)	94.8 (34.9)
Mean daily maximum °F (°C)	21.2 (−6.0)	25.5 (−3.6)	38.0 (3.3)	54.7 (12.6)	67.9 (19.9)	77.4 (25.2)	80.9 (27.2)	79.1 (26.2)	71.7 (22.1)	57.6 (14.2)	40.4 (4.7)	26.4 (−3.1)	53.4 (11.9)
Daily mean °F (°C)	12.3 (−10.9)	16.1 (−8.8)	29.2 (−1.6)	44.1 (6.7)	57.3 (14.1)	67.5 (19.7)	70.9 (21.6)	68.7 (20.4)	60.5 (15.8)	47.0 (8.3)	31.6 (−0.2)	18.5 (−7.5)	43.6 (6.5)
Mean daily minimum °F (°C)	3.4 (−15.9)	6.8 (−14.0)	20.4 (−6.4)	33.5 (0.8)	46.7 (8.2)	57.6 (14.2)	61.0 (16.1)	58.3 (14.6)	49.3 (9.6)	36.5 (2.5)	22.9 (−5.1)	10.6 (−11.9)	33.9 (1.1)
Mean minimum °F (°C)	−18.8 (−28.2)	−16.1 (−26.7)	−4.1 (−20.1)	19.5 (−6.9)	33.7 (0.9)	47.1 (8.4)	51.4 (10.8)	48.1 (8.9)	35.3 (1.8)	20.9 (−6.2)	5.3 (−14.8)	−11.9 (−24.4)	−22.6 (−30.3)
Record low °F (°C)	−30 (−34)	−29 (−34)	−19 (−28)	2 (−17)	28 (−2)	41 (5)	45 (7)	36 (2)	27 (−3)	9 (−13)	−8 (−22)	−31 (−35)	−31 (−35)
Average precipitation inches (mm)	0.66 (17)	0.84 (21)	1.51 (38)	2.99 (76)	4.30 (109)	5.24 (133)	3.53 (90)	4.39 (112)	3.22 (82)	2.63 (67)	1.32 (34)	1.07 (27)	31.70 (805)
Average snowfall inches (cm)	6.9 (18)	11.8 (30)	7.6 (19)	7.0 (18)	0.1 (0.25)	0.0 (0.0)	0.0 (0.0)	0.0 (0.0)	0.0 (0.0)	0.8 (2.0)	3.6 (9.1)	12.2 (31)	50.0 (127)
Average extreme snow depth inches (cm)	11.3 (29)	14.1 (36)	13.8 (35)	4.6 (12)	0.1 (0.25)	0.0 (0.0)	0.0 (0.0)	0.0 (0.0)	0.0 (0.0)	0.2 (0.51)	2.2 (5.6)	10.4 (26)	18.7 (47)
Average precipitation days (≥ 0.01 in)	4.8	4.8	6.1	8.8	11.0	10.9	7.5	8.9	7.8	8.1	4.5	6.4	89.6
Average snowy days (≥ 0.1 in)	4.0	4.2	2.1	1.5	0.1	0.0	0.0	0.0	0.0	0.4	1.8	4.7	18.8
Source 1: NOAA
Source 2: National Weather Service (mean maxima/minima, snow depth 2006–2020)

== Demographics ==
Historical population
Census	Pop.	Note	%±
1880	75		—
1890	384		412.0%
1900	454		18.2%
1910	509		12.1%
1920	540		6.1%
1930	632		17.0%
1940	723		14.4%
1950	696		−3.7%
1960	698		0.3%
1970	688		−1.4%
1980	697		1.3%
1990	781		12.1%
2000	807		3.3%
2010	762		−5.6%
2020	731		−4.1%
U.S. Decennial Census

=== 2010 census ===
As of the census of 2010, there were 762 people, 314 households, and 197 families living in the city. The population density was 2,005.3 inhabitants per square mile (774.3/km^{2}). There were 349 housing units at an average density of 918.4 per square mile (354.6/km^{2}). The racial makeup of the city was 97.0% White, 0.1% African American, 0.3% Native American, 0.8% Asian, 0.1% Pacific Islander, 1.2% from other races, and 0.5% from two or more races. Hispanic or Latino of any race were 7.0% of the population.

There were 314 households, of which 31.5% had children under the age of 18 living with them, 51.9% were married couples living together, 5.4% had a female householder with no husband present, 5.4% had a male householder with no wife present, and 37.3% were non-families. 34.1% of all households were made up of individuals, and 17.8% had someone living alone who was 65 years of age or older. The average household size was 2.43 and the average family size was 3.11.

The median age in the city was 39 years. 25.6% of residents were under the age of 18; 6.3% were between the ages of 18 and 24; 26.2% were from 25 to 44; 26.8% were from 45 to 64; and 15.1% were 65 years of age or older. The gender makeup of the city was 49.6% male and 50.4% female.

=== 2000 census ===
As of the census of 2000, there were 807 people, 313 households, and 210 families living in the city. The population density was 2,139.1 inhabitants per square mile (825.9/km^{2}). There were 344 housing units at an average density of 911.8 per square mile (352.0/km^{2}). The racial makeup of the city was 94.92% White, 0.99% Asian, 3.47% from other races, and 0.62% from two or more races. Hispanic or Latino of any race were 4.09% of the population.

There were 313 households, out of which 34.8% had children under the age of 18 living with them, 56.9% were married couples living together, 7.7% had a female householder with no husband present, and 32.9% were non-families. 29.1% of all households were made up of individuals, and 15.3% had someone living alone who was 65 years of age or older. The average household size was 2.55 and the average family size was 3.20.

In the city, the population was spread out, with 28.6% under the age of 18, 7.2% from 18 to 24, 27.6% from 25 to 44, 19.2% from 45 to 64, and 17.3% who were 65 years of age or older. The median age was 36 years. For every 100 females, there were 88.1 males. For every 100 females age 18 and over, there were 90.1 males.

The median income for a household in the city was $36,932, and the median income for a family was $48,500. Males had a median income of $32,292 versus $23,177 for females. The per capita income for the city was $17,290. About 5.2% of families and 9.3% of the population were below the poverty line, including 11.4% of those under age 18 and 11.4% of those age 65 or over.
