= Minneapolis–Saint Paul =

Metropolitan area in Minnesota, United States

Coordinates: 44°57′N 93°12′W

Minneapolis–Saint Paul: Minneapolis–St. Paul–Bloomington, MN–WI; Metropolitan area
- Metropolitan area
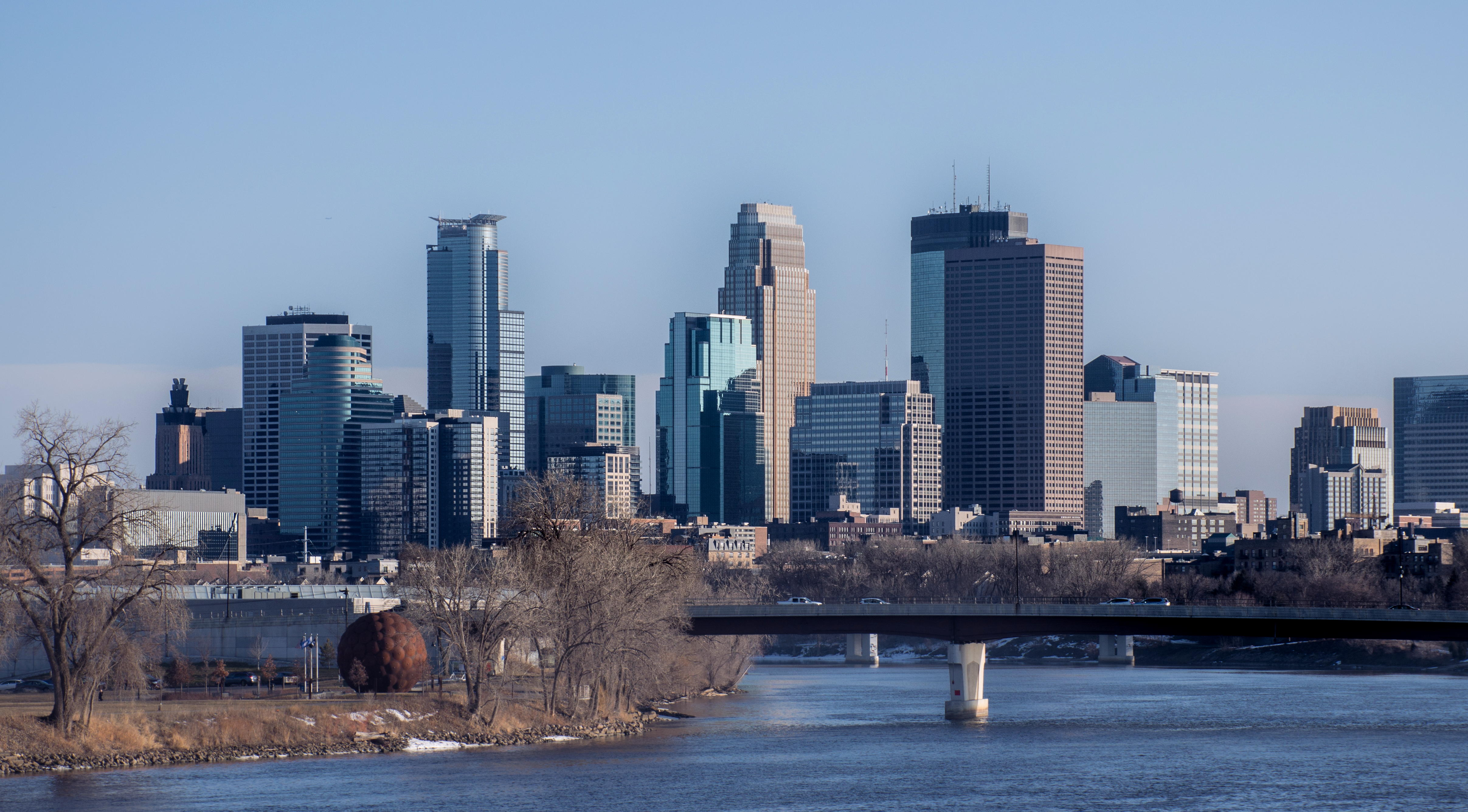
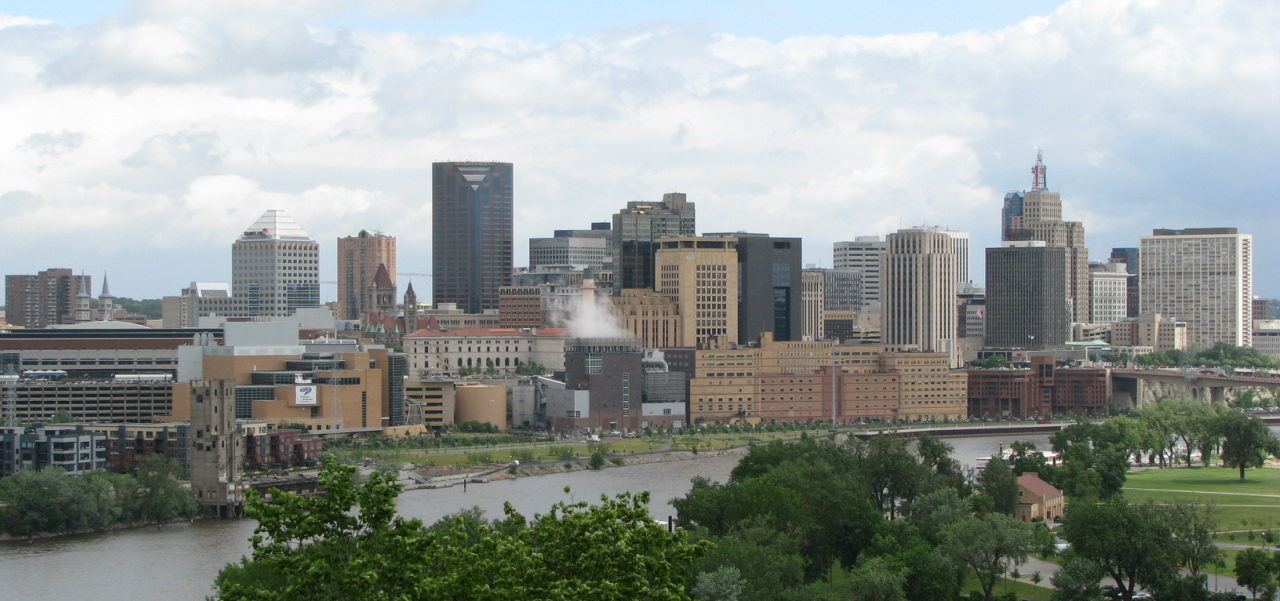
- Minneapolis (top) and Saint Paul (bottom)

- Minneapolis-St. Paul metropolitan statistical area (Met Council counties in red)
- Country: United States
- States: Minnesota and Wisconsin
- Principal cities: Minneapolis, Saint Paul

Area
  - Urban: 1,021.8 sq mi (2,646 km^{2})
  - Metro: 8,120 sq mi (21,000 km^{2})
- Highest elevation: 1,376 ft (419 m)
- Lowest elevation: 660 ft (200 m)

Population (2020)
  - Urban: 2,650,890 (16th)
  - Urban density: 2,594.3/sq mi (1,001.7/km^{2})
  - MSA: 3,690,261 (16th)
  - CSA: 4,078,788 (16th)
- MSA/CSA: 2020; Urban: 2018

GDP
  - MSA: $350.710 billion (2023)
- Time zone: UTC−6 (CST)
  - Summer (DST): UTC−5 (CDT)
- Area codes: 320, 507, 612, 651, 715/534, 763, 952

Minneapolis–Saint Paul is a major metropolitan area built around the confluence of the Mississippi, Minnesota, and St. Croix rivers in east central Minnesota. The area is commonly known as the Twin Cities after its two largest cities, Minneapolis, the state's most populous city, and its neighbor to the east, Saint Paul, the capital. Minnesotans often refer to the two together (or the metro area collectively) as "the Cities." It is the third-largest metropolitan area in the Midwest and the 16th-largest metropolitan statistical area in the U.S.

Minneapolis and Saint Paul are independent municipalities with defined borders. Minneapolis is mostly west of the Mississippi River and is somewhat more modern, with a relatively young downtown and trendy uptown. Saint Paul, which is mostly east of the river, has been likened to an East Coast city, with quaint neighborhoods and many well-preserved houses with late-Victorian architecture. The cities' distinct cultures led an observer to say, "St. Paul is the last city of the East; Minneapolis the first city of the West."

Originally inhabited by Ojibwe and Dakota people, the area was settled by many European groups. Minneapolis was influenced by early Scandinavian and Lutheran settlers, while Saint Paul was settled predominantly by French, Irish, and German Catholic communities. Today, the cities are home to large immigrant communities, including Somali, Hmong, and Oromo groups.

"Twin Cities" is sometimes used to refer to the seven-county region governed by the Metropolitan Council regional governmental agency and planning organization. The Office of Management and Budget designates 15 counties as the "Minneapolis–St. Paul–Bloomington, MN–WI Metropolitan Statistical Area". It had a population of 3,690,261 at the 2020 census. The larger 21-county Minneapolis–St. Paul MN–WI Combined Statistical Area, the nation's 16th-largest combined statistical area, had a population of 4,078,788 at the 2020 census.

== History ==
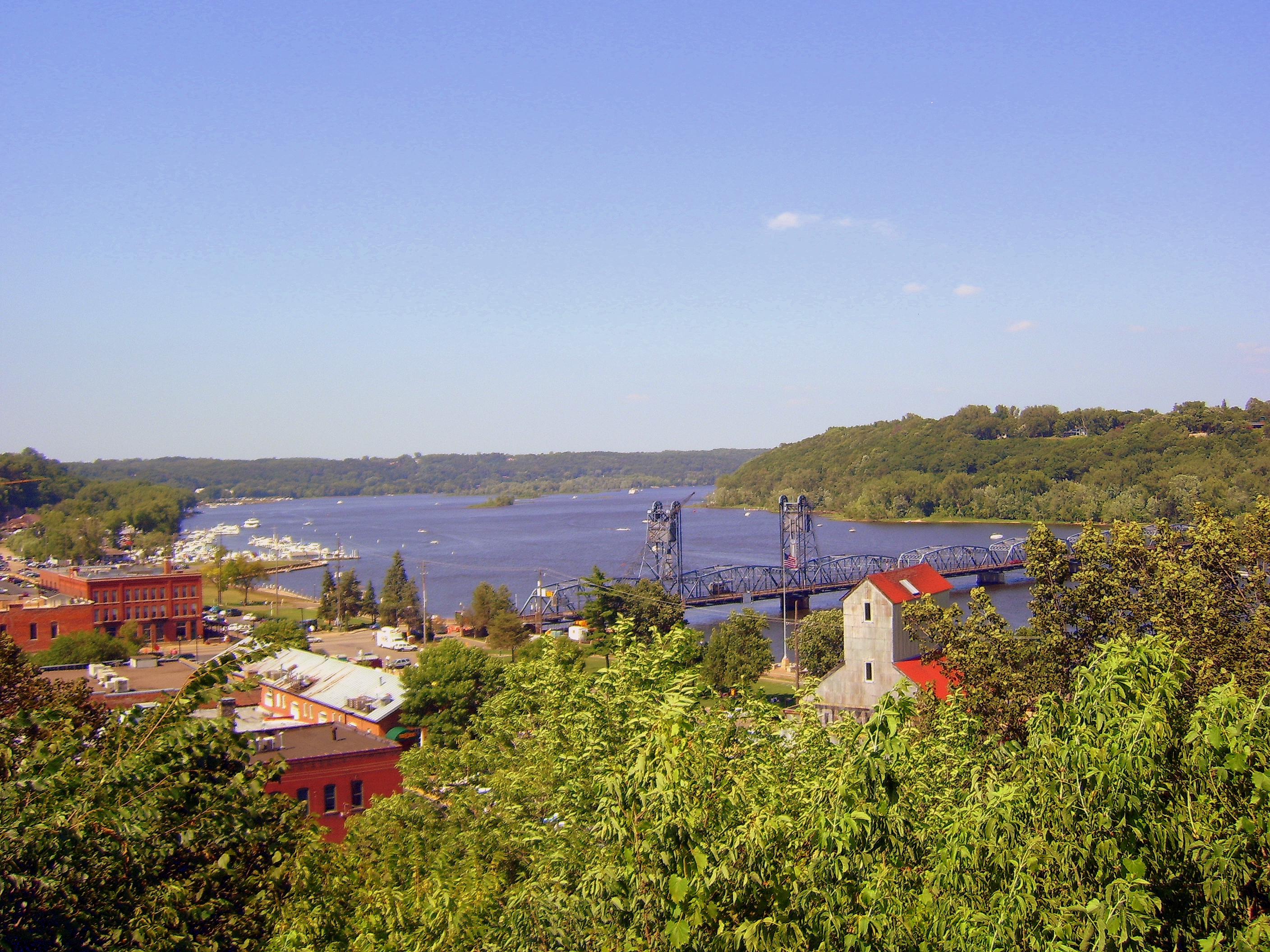
St. Croix River in Stillwater

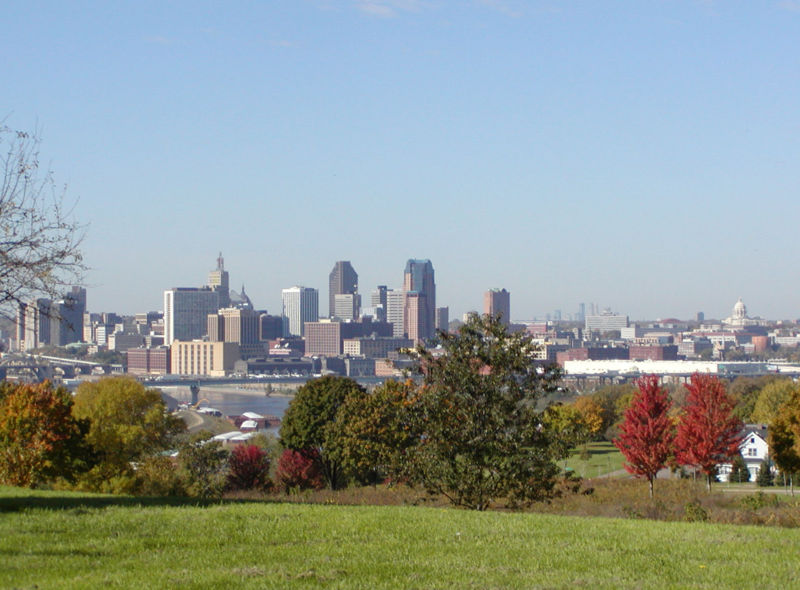
St. Paul with barges on the Mississippi River, the Capitol dome, and Minneapolis's skyline in the far background (right of St. Paul). In the lower right is a typical 19th century home in Indian Mounds Park.

=== European settlement ===
The first European settlement in the region was near what is now the town of Stillwater, Minnesota, about 20 miles (30 km) from downtown Saint Paul and on the western bank of the St. Croix River, which forms the border of central Minnesota and Wisconsin. Another settlement that fueled early interest in the area was the outpost at Fort Snelling, which was constructed from 1820 to 1825 at the confluence of the Minnesota River and the Mississippi River.

The Fort Snelling military reservation bordered both sides of the river up to Saint Anthony Falls. The town of Saint Anthony grew just outside the reservation on the river's east side. For several years, the only European resident to live on the west bank of the river was Colonel John H. Stevens, who operated a ferry service across the river. When the military reservation was reduced in size, settlers quickly moved to the land, creating the new village of Minneapolis. The town grew, with Minneapolis and Saint Anthony eventually merging. On the eastern side of the Mississippi, a few villages such as Pig's Eye and Lambert's Landing grew to become Saint Paul.

=== 2025-2026 ===
Operation Metro Surge, a Department of Homeland Security operation involving the US Immigration and Customs Enforcement (ICE) and US Customs and Border Protection, began in December 2025, focused on detaining and deporting undocumented immigrants. Initially targeting Minneapolis and Saint Paul, between 2,000 and 3,000 agents deployed in the state. Grassroots activists took trainings to observe and record ICE actions. In January 2026, ICE officers killed Renée Good in Minneapolis; later in the month, Border Patrol agents killed Alex Pretti. Tens of thousands engaged in mostly peaceful protests. Legal challenges were filed to stop the large-scale deployment of ICE agents.

Following the events of Operation Metro Surge, the people of the Twin Cities received a Profile in Courage Award for their efforts to defend the human rights of their neighbors and immigrant communities. Imam Yusuf Abdulle, Natalie Ehret, Carolina Ortiz, and Zena Stenvik represented the people of the Twin Cities during the award ceremony, held in Boston on May 31, 2026.

== Geography ==
Natural geography played a role in the two cities' settlement and development. The Mississippi River Valley in the area is defined by a series of stone bluffs that line the river. Saint Paul grew up around Lambert's Landing, the last place to unload boats coming upriver at an easily accessible point, seven miles (11 km) downstream from Saint Anthony Falls, the geographic feature that, due to the value of its immense water power for industry, defined Minneapolis's location and its prominence as the Mill City. The falls can be seen from the Mill City Museum, housed in the former Washburn "A" Mill, which was among the world's largest mills in its time. The phrase "St. Paul is the last city of the East, Minneapolis the first city of the West" alludes to the historical difference.

=== Farming ===
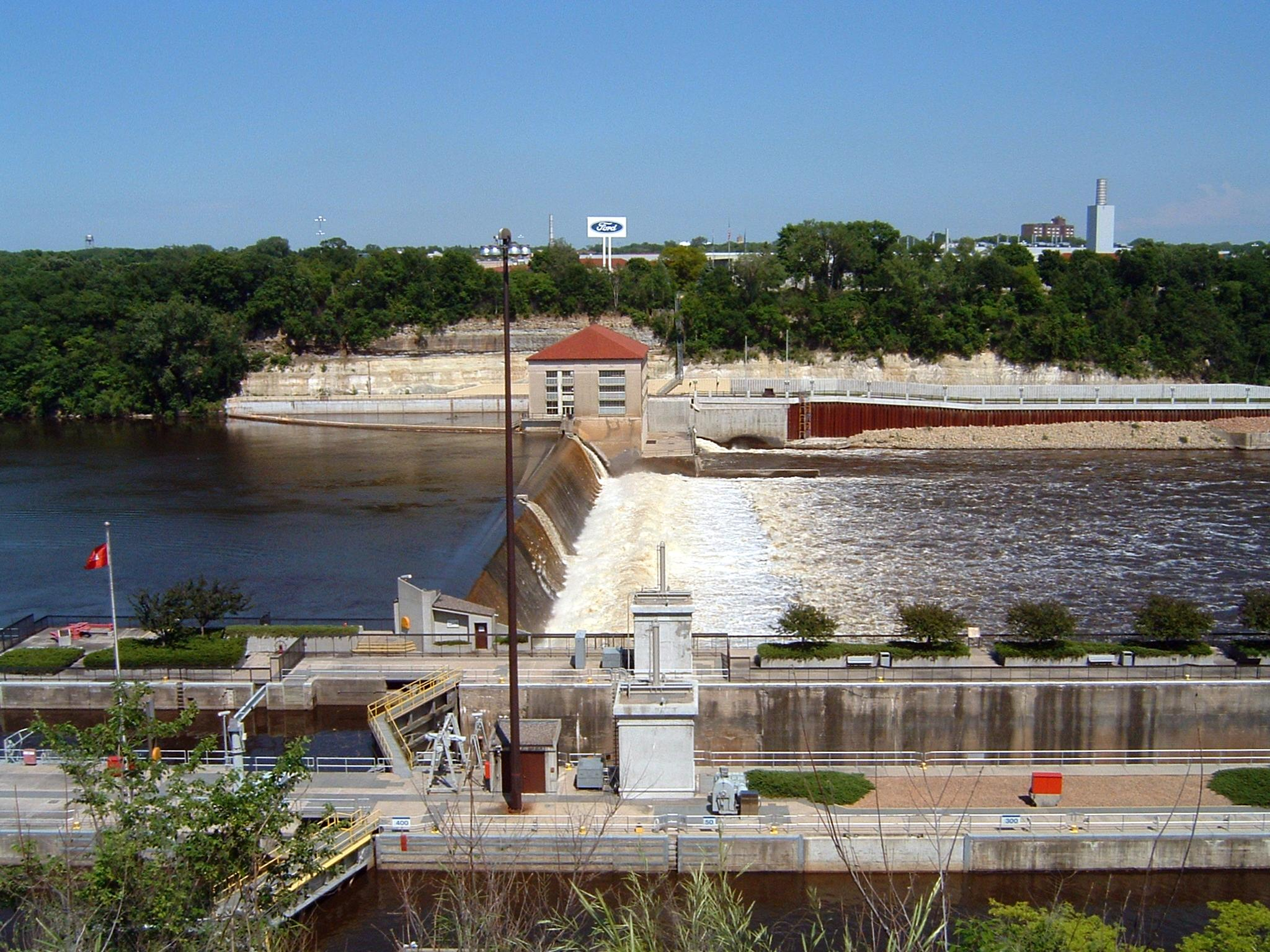
Lock and Dam No. 1 on the Mississippi River upstream from the Minnesota River

The state's oldest farms are in Washington County. The county borders the St. Croix River and Wisconsin on the eastern side of the metropolitan area. Joseph Haskell was Minnesota's first white farmer, harvesting the first crops in the state in 1840 on what is now part of Afton Township on Trading Post Trail.

=== Grand Excursion ===
The Grand Excursion, a trip into the Upper Midwest sponsored by the Rock Island Railroad, brought more than a thousand curious travelers into the area by rail and steamboat in 1854. In 1855, Henry Wadsworth Longfellow published The Song of Hiawatha, an epic poem based on the Ojibwe legends of Hiawatha. A number of natural area landmarks appear in the story, including Lake Minnetonka and Minnehaha Falls. Tourists inspired by the coverage of the Grand Excursion in eastern newspapers and those who read The Song of Hiawatha flocked to the area in the following decades.

=== Rail transport ===
At one time, the region had numerous passenger rail services, including both interurban streetcar systems and interstate rail. Due to the river's width at points farther south, the Minneapolis–Saint Paul area was briefly one of the few places where the Mississippi could be crossed by railroad. Much commercial rail traffic also ran through the area, often carrying grain to be processed at Minneapolis mills or delivering other goods to Saint Paul to be transported along the Mississippi. Saint Paul was long at the head of navigation on the river, until a lock and dam facility was added upriver in Minneapolis.

Passenger travel hit its peak in 1888, with nearly eight million traversing to and from Saint Paul Union Depot. This amounted to approximately 150 trains daily. Soon, other rail crossings were built farther south and travel through the region began to decline. In an effort by the rail companies to combat the rise of the automobile, some of the earliest streamliners ran from Chicago to Minneapolis/Saint Paul and eventually served distant points in the Pacific Northwest. Today, this interstate service is served by Amtrak's Seattle/Portland-to-Chicago Empire Builder route, running once daily in each direction, and supplemented by the Borealis route to Chicago. The Empire Builder is named after James J. Hill, a railroad tycoon who settled on Summit Avenue in Saint Paul in what is now known as the James J. Hill House.

=== Socioeconomic history ===
Like many northern cities that came of age during the Industrial Revolution, Minneapolis and St. Paul experienced shifts in their economic base as heavy industry and manufacturing jobs shifted to the South or abroad, especially in the 1960s and 1970s. With the economic nadir of those decades came a population decline in the central city areas, white flight to suburbs, and, in 1967, race riots on Minneapolis's North Side. But by the 1980s and 1990s, Minneapolis and Saint Paul were often cited as former Rust Belt cities that had made successful transitions to service, high-technology, finance, and information economies.

In May and June 2020, the Minneapolis–Saint Paul metropolitan area became a focus of international attention after MPD officer Derek Chauvin murdered George Floyd by kneeling on his neck for almost ten minutes. The murder sparked local, nationwide and international protests against racism and police brutality, bringing considerable attention to the MPD. Minneapolis–Saint Paul was the site of the second-costliest act of civil disobedience in U.S. history, after the 1992 Los Angeles Riots. Local protests and riots caused an estimated $550 million in damages and affected around 1,600 businesses.

=== Rivalry ===
Minneapolis and Saint Paul have competed since they were founded, resulting in some duplication of effort. After Saint Paul completed its elaborate cathedral in 1915, Minneapolis followed up with the equally ornate Basilica of St. Mary in 1926. In the late 19th and early 20th centuries, the rivalry became so intense that an architect practicing in one city was often refused business in the other. The 1890 United States census even led to the two cities arresting and/or kidnapping each other's census takers, in an attempt to keep each city from outgrowing the other.

The rivalry occasionally erupted into inter-city violence, as at a 1929 game between the Minneapolis Millers and the St. Paul Saints, both baseball teams of the American Association. In the 1950s, both cities competed for a major league baseball franchise (which resulted in two rival stadiums being built), and there was a brief period in the mid-1960s when the two cities could not agree on a common calendar for daylight saving time, resulting in a few weeks when people in Minneapolis were one hour "behind" those in Saint Paul.

The cities' mutual antagonism was largely healed by the end of the 1960s, aided by the simultaneous arrival in 1961 of the Minnesota Twins of the American League and the Minnesota Vikings of the National Football League, both of which identified themselves with the state as a whole (the former explicitly named for both Twin Cities) rather than either city (like the earlier Minneapolis Lakers). Since 1961, it has been common practice for any major sports team based in the Twin Cities to be named for Minnesota as a whole. In terms of development, the two cities remain distinct in their progress, with Minneapolis absorbing new and avant-garde architecture while Saint Paul continues to carefully integrate new buildings into the context of classical and Victorian styles.

== Geology ==
Like much of Minnesota, the Twin Cities area was shaped by water and ice over millions of years. The area's land sits atop thick layers of sandstone and limestone laid down as seas encroached upon and receded from the region. Erosion caused natural caves to develop, which were expanded into mines when white settlers came to the area. During Prohibition, at least one speakeasy was built into these hidden spaces—eventually refurbished as Saint Paul's Wabasha Street Caves.

Lakes across the area were formed and altered by the movement of glaciers. This left many bodies of water in the region, some with unusual shapes. For example, Lake Minnetonka, toward the western side of the Twin Cities, consists of a complex arrangement of channels and large bays. Elevations in the area range from 1,376 feet (419 m) above sea level in the northwest metro to 666 feet (203 m) at the edge of the Mississippi River in the southeast.

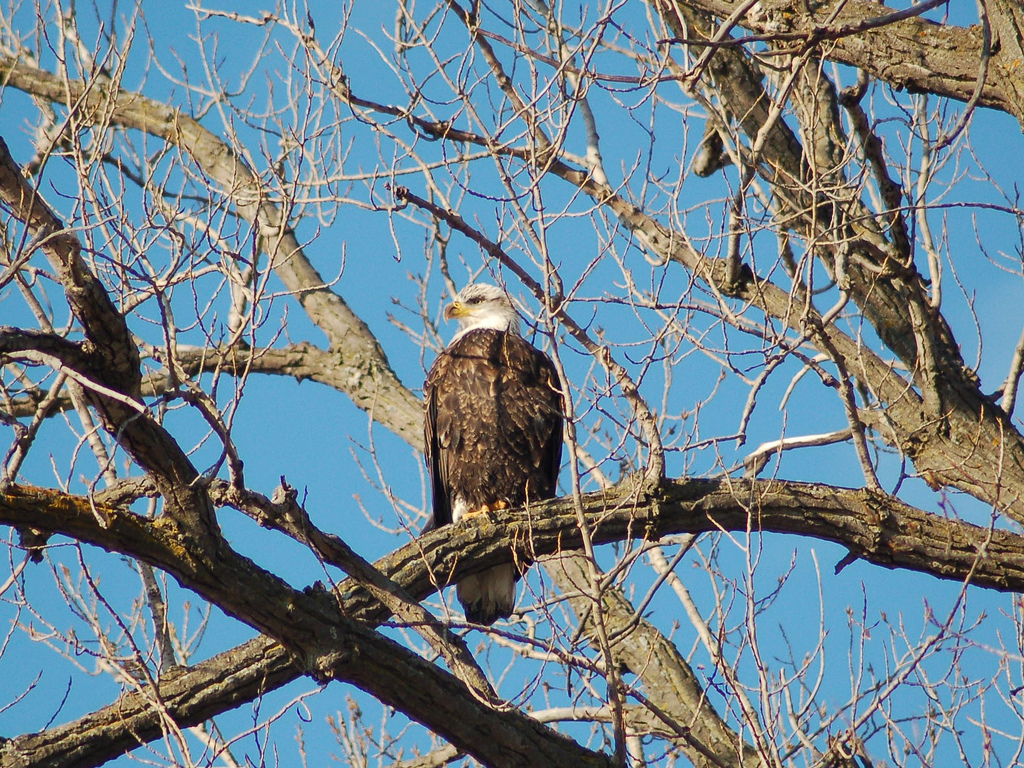
Bald eagle in Burnsville

=== Climate ===
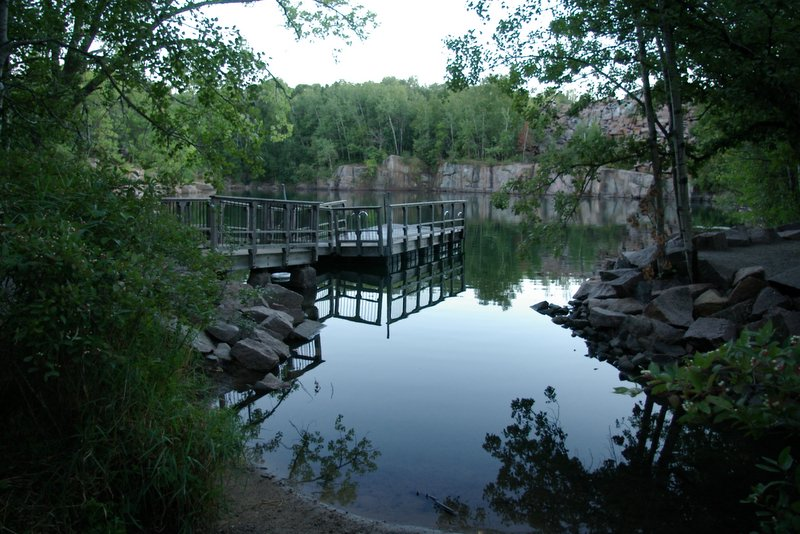
August swimming at Quarry Park and Nature Preserve, Waite Park near St. Cloud

Owing to their northerly latitude and inland location, the Twin Cities experience the coldest climate of any major metropolitan area in the United States. But due to their southern location in the state and the urban heat island, the Twin Cities are among Minnesota's warmest places. The average annual temperature recorded at the Minneapolis–Saint Paul International Airport is 45.4 °F (7.4 °C); 3.5 °F (1.9 °C) colder than Winona, Minnesota, and 8.8 °F (4.9 °C) warmer than Roseau, Minnesota. Monthly average daily high temperatures range from 21.9 °F (−5.6 °C) in January to 83.3 °F (28.5 °C) in July; the average daily minimum temperatures for those months are 4.3 °F (−15.4 °C) and 63.0 °F (17.2 °C) respectively.

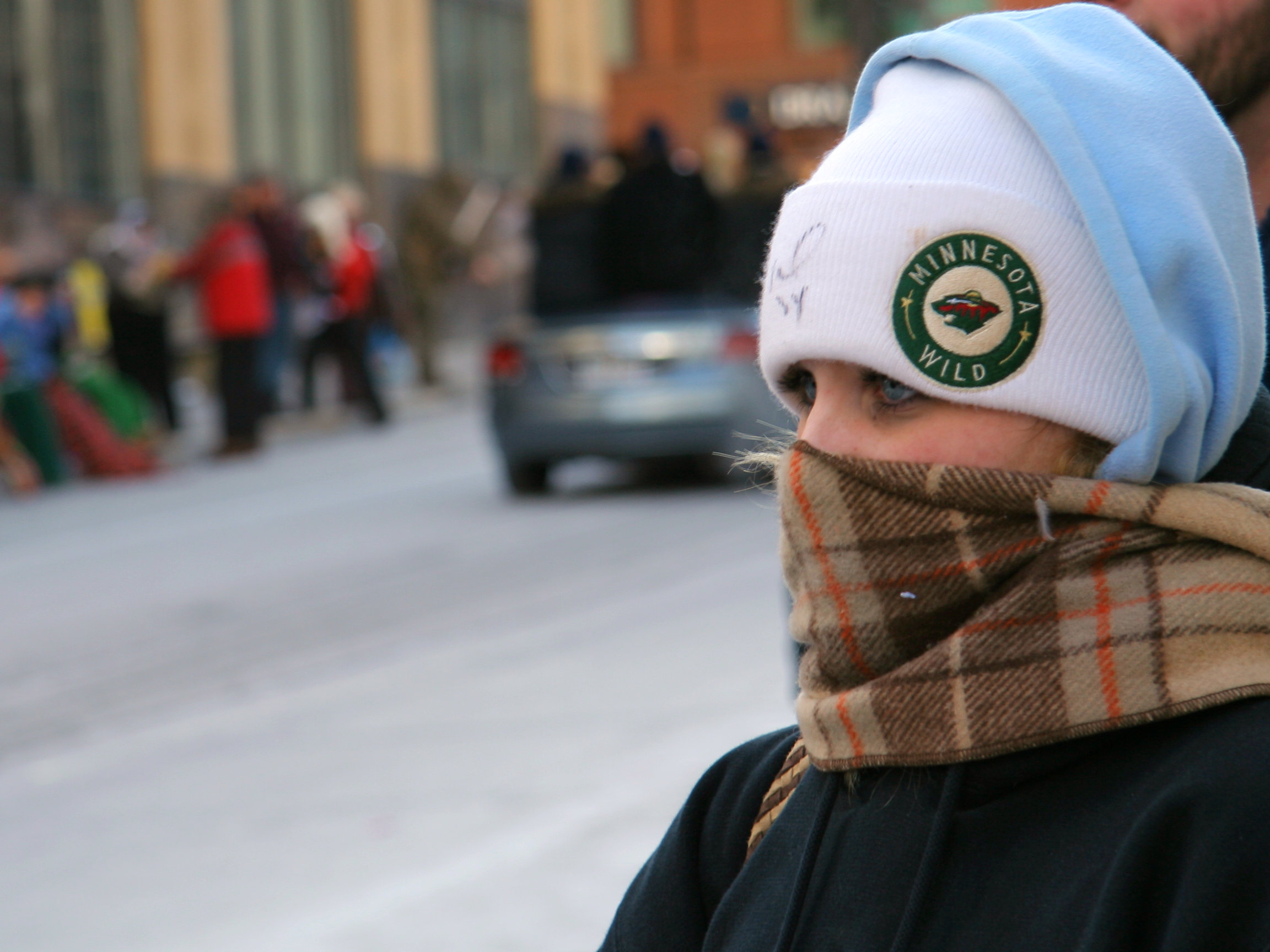
Viewing the Saint Paul Winter Carnival parade in January.

Minimum temperatures of 0 °F (−18 °C) or lower are seen on an average of 29.7 days per year, and 76.2 days do not have a maximum temperature exceeding the freezing point. Temperatures above 90 °F (32 °C) occur an average of 15 times per year. Higher temperatures at or above 100 °F (38 °C) are recorded once every 4–5 years on average, and sometimes more than one day during a single summer. The lowest temperature ever reported at the Minneapolis–Saint Paul International Airport was −34 °F (−37 °C) on January 22, 1936; the highest, 108 °F (42 °C), was reported on July 14 of the same year. Early settlement records at Fort Snelling show temperatures as low as −42 °F (−41 °C). Recent records include −40 °F (−40 °C) at Vadnais Lake on February 2, 1996 (National Climatic Data Center).

Precipitation averages 29.41 inches (747 mm) per year, and is most plentiful in June (4.34 inches (110 mm)) and least so in February (0.79 inches (20 mm)). The greatest one-day rainfall amount was 9.15 inches (232 mm), reported on July 23, 1987. The cities' record for lowest annual precipitation was set in 1910, when 11.54 inches (293 mm) fell throughout the year; coincidentally, the opposite record of 40.15 inches (1,020 mm) was set the next year. At an annual average of 56.3 inches (143 cm), snowfall is generally abundant.

The Twin Cities area takes the brunt of many types of extreme weather, including high-speed straight-line winds, tornadoes, flash floods, drought, heat, bitter cold, and blizzards. The costliest weather disaster in Twin Cities history was a derecho event on May 15, 1998. Hail and wind damage exceeded $950 million, much of it in the Twin Cities. Other memorable Twin Cities weather-related events include the tornado outbreak on May 6, 1965, the Armistice Day Blizzard on November 11, 1940, and the Halloween Blizzard of 1991. In January 2019, Minnesota experienced its coldest temperatures since 1996, when a polar vortex dropped temperatures as low as −56 °F (−49 °C) in Cotton, Minnesota, with wind-chill temperatures lower than −60 °F (−51 °C) in much of the state. These temperatures are colder than those found on the surface of Mars. (See: Department of Natural Resources - Cold Outbreak: January 27-31, 2019)

A normal growing season in the metro extends from late April or early May through the month of October. The USDA places the area in the 4a plant hardiness zone.

== Communities ==
=== Metropolitan Statistical Area ===
The Minneapolis–St. Paul–Bloomington, MN–WI Metropolitan Statistical Area, or Twin Cities, includes 15 counties, of which 13 are in Minnesota and two in Wisconsin. The Minnesota portion accounts for almost two-thirds of Minnesota's population.

Note: Counties that are bolded are under jurisdiction of the Metropolitan Council. Le Sueur and Mille Lacs Counties were added to the MSA when the Office of Management and Budget revised its delineations of metropolitan statistical areas in 2013. Sibley County was included in the metropolitan statistical area from 2013 to 2018.

Map of the 21 counties of the Minneapolis-St. Paul, MN-WI Combined Statistical Area as of 2018. MSA counties under the Metropolitan Council Minneapolis-St. Paul-Bloomington MSA counties defined by the Census as "central" Minneapolis-St. Paul-Bloomington MSA counties defined by the Census as "outlying" Counties included in the St. Cloud Metropolitan Statistical Area Counties that are separate Micropolitan Statistical Areas

County	Seat	2025 estimate	2020 census	Change	Area	Density
**Hennepin**	Minneapolis	1,284,784	1,281,565	+0.25%	607 sq mi (1,570 km^{2})	2,117/sq mi (817/km^{2})
**Ramsey**	Saint Paul	541,623	552,352	−1.94%	170 sq mi (440 km^{2})	3,186/sq mi (1,230/km^{2})
**Dakota**	Hastings	457,710	439,882	+4.05%	587 sq mi (1,520 km^{2})	780/sq mi (301/km^{2})
**Anoka**	Anoka	381,605	363,887	+4.87%	446 sq mi (1,160 km^{2})	856/sq mi (330/km^{2})
**Washington**	Stillwater	286,895	267,568	+7.22%	423 sq mi (1,100 km^{2})	678/sq mi (262/km^{2})
**Scott**	Shakopee	159,017	150,928	+5.36%	365 sq mi (950 km^{2})	436/sq mi (168/km^{2})
Wright	Buffalo	157,559	141,337	+11.48%	714 sq mi (1,850 km^{2})	221/sq mi (85/km^{2})
**Carver**	Chaska	114,379	106,922	+6.97%	376 sq mi (970 km^{2})	304/sq mi (117/km^{2})
Sherburne	Elk River	104,194	97,183	+7.21%	451 sq mi (1,170 km^{2})	231/sq mi (89/km^{2})
St. Croix, WI	Hudson	98,276	93,536	+5.07%	736 sq mi (1,910 km^{2})	134/sq mi (52/km^{2})
Chisago	Center City	59,142	56,621	+4.45%	442 sq mi (1,140 km^{2})	134/sq mi (52/km^{2})
Isanti	Cambridge	44,386	41,135	+7.90%	452 sq mi (1,170 km^{2})	98/sq mi (38/km^{2})
Pierce, WI	Ellsworth	43,519	42,212	+3.10%	592 sq mi (1,530 km^{2})	74/sq mi (28/km^{2})
Le Sueur	Le Center	29,453	28,674	+2.72%	449 sq mi (1,160 km^{2})	66/sq mi (25/km^{2})
Mille Lacs	Milaca	27,753	26,459	+4.89%	682 sq mi (1,770 km^{2})	41/sq mi (16/km^{2})
**Total**		3,790,295	3,690,261	+2.71%	8,093 sq mi (20,960 km^{2})	468/sq mi (181/km^{2})

=== Combined Statistical Area ===
The Minneapolis–St. Paul, MN–WI Combined Statistical Area is made up of 19 counties in Minnesota and two counties in Wisconsin. The statistical area includes two metropolitan areas and four micropolitan areas. In 2018, the Owatonna Micropolitan Statistical Area was added to the CSA.

Statistical Area	2025 Estimate	2020 Census	Change	Area	Density
Minneapolis–St. Paul–Bloomington MN–WI Metropolitan Statistical Area	3,790,295	3,690,261	+2.71%	8,093 sq mi (20,960 km^{2})	468/sq mi (181/km^{2})
St. Cloud, MN Metropolitan Statistical Area (Stearns and Benton counties)	205,854	199,801	+3.03%	1,803 sq mi (4,670 km^{2})	114/sq mi (44/km^{2})
Faribault-Northfield, MN Micropolitan Statistical Area (Rice County)	69,939	67,097	+4.24%	516 sq mi (1,340 km^{2})	136/sq mi (52/km^{2})
Red Wing, MN Micropolitan Statistical Area (Goodhue County)	48,195	47,582	+1.29%	780 sq mi (2,000 km^{2})	62/sq mi (24/km^{2})
Owatonna, MN Micropolitan Statistical Area (Steele County)	37,464	37,406	+0.16%	432 sq mi (1,120 km^{2})	87/sq mi (33/km^{2})
Hutchinson, MN Micropolitan Statistical Area (McLeod County)	36,631	36,771	−0.38%	506 sq mi (1,310 km^{2})	72/sq mi (28/km^{2})
**Total**	4,188,378	4,078,788	+2.69%	12,130 sq mi (31,400 km^{2})	345/sq mi (133/km^{2})

=== Cities and suburbs ===
There are approximately 218 incorporated municipalities in the Twin Cities metropolitan region. This includes census-designated places (CDPs) and villages in Wisconsin, but excludes unincorporated towns in Wisconsin, known as civil townships in other states. The below categories are based on United States Census Bureau 2025 population estimates. No population estimates are released for CDPs, which are marked with an asterisk (*) and categorized based on their 2020 Census population. Places designated "principal cities" by the U.S. Office of Management and Budget are italicized.

Places with more than 100,000 inhabitants

- Minneapolis (430,324)
- Saint Paul (306,684)

Places with 50,000 to 100,000 inhabitants

- Bloomington (89,034)
- Brooklyn Park (83,543)
- Woodbury (81,558)
- Lakeville (79,270)
- Plymouth (78,942)
- Blaine (76,603)
- Maple Grove (73,893)
- Eagan (67,109)
- Burnsville (65,244)
- Coon Rapids (64,193)
- Eden Prairie (63,075)
- Apple Valley (55,248)
- Edina (54,356)
- Minnetonka (53,969)
- St. Louis Park (50,027)

Places with 25,000 to 49,999 inhabitants

- Shakopee (49,366)
- Cottage Grove (43,604)
- Maplewood (40,717)
- Inver Grove Heights (36,873)
- Richfield (36,593)
- Roseville (35,663)
- Andover (33,874)
- Savage (32,970)
- Rosemount (31,881)
- Brooklyn Center (31,846)
- Fridley (30,829)
- Oakdale (30,588)
- Chaska (30,513)
- Ramsey (29,624)
- Prior Lake (28,140)
- Elk River (27,896)
- Shoreview (26,906)
- Chanhassen (25,748)
- Otsego (25,454)
- Farmington (25,425)

Places with 10,000 to 24,999 inhabitants

- White Bear Lake (23,392)
- Lino Lakes (23,220)
- Champlin (23,125)
- Hastings (22,563)
- St. Michael (22,498)
- Columbia Heights (22,482)
- Crystal (22,239)
- New Brighton (22,159)
- West St. Paul (21,950)
- Golden Valley (21,325)
- Forest Lake (20,952)
- New Hope (20,807)
- South St. Paul (20,532)
- Hopkins (19,523)
- Stillwater (19,354)
- Anoka (18,169)
- River Falls, WI (17,916)
- Hugo (17,167)
- Ham Lake (17,104)
- Buffalo (16,878)
- Monticello (15,670)
- Rogers (15,606)
- Hudson, WI (15,019)
- Lake Elmo (14,376)
- Waconia (14,113)
- Robbinsdale (14,030)
- Vadnais Heights (13,052)
- Big Lake (12,929)
- Mounds View (12,786)
- North St. Paul (12,780)
- East Bethel (12,605)
- Victoria (12,447)
- North Branch (12,398)
- Mendota Heights (11,475)
- Dayton (11,402)
- Cambridge (11,090)
- Little Canada (10,567)

Places with fewer than 10,000 inhabitants

- St. Anthony (9,989)
- Corcoran (9,269)
- Arden Hills (9,583)
- Oak Grove (9,476)
- Minnetrista (9,458)
- Mound (9,064)
- Saint Francis (8,635)
- Albertville (8,544)
- Orono (8,301)
- New Prague (8,238)
- Mahtomedi (8,189)
- Wyoming (8,121)
- Delano (7,788)
- Isanti (7,714)
- Belle Plaine (7,632)
- Shorewood (7,620)
- Medina (7,460)
- Baldwin (7,231)
- Carver (7,198)
- Spring Lake Park (7,127)
- Jordan (6,988)
- Zimmerman (6,904)
- Livonia (6,479)
- Chisago City (5,955)
- Credit River (5,644)
- Newport (5,525)
- Princeton (5,480)
- Becker (5,425)
- Saint Paul Park (5,396)
- Elko New Market (5,300)
- North Oaks (5,283)
- Lonsdale (5,117)
- Falcon Heights (5,071)
- Lindstrom (5,039)
- Circle Pines (4,967)
- Rockford (4,827)
- Watertown (4,789)
- Nowthen (4,630)
- Oak Park Heights (4,625)
- Prescott, WI (4,581)
- Hanover (4,392)
- Stacy (4,367)
- Columbus (4,356)
- Wayzata (4,344)
- Le Sueur (4,210)
- Montrose (3,986)
- Scandia (3,979)
- Centerville (3,978)
- Grant (3,954)
- Annandale (3,801)
- Deephaven (3,794)
- Norwood Young America (3,777)
- Independence (3,763)
- Bayport (3,721)
- Montgomery (3,539)
- Rush City (3,300)
- Lexington (3,081)
- Empire (3,063)
- Milaca (3,041)
- Greenfield (2,962)
- Afton (2,960)
- Cokato (2,793)
- Mayer (2,563)
- Osseo (2,534)
- Le Center (2,524)
- Lauderdale (2,328)
- Excelsior (2,316)
- Waverly (2,293)
- Howard Lake (2,288)
- Clearwater (2,225)
- Maple Lake (2,216)
- St. Bonifacius (2,171)
- Cologne (2,139)
- Long Lake (1,944)
- Braham (1,789)
- Waterville (1,757)
- Lakeland (1,659)
- Maple Plain (1,653)
- Spring Park (1,647)
- Tonka Bay (1,561)
- Medicine Lake (1,342)
- Shafer (1,212)
- Dellwood (1,148)
- Harris (1,139)
- Taylors Falls (1,054)
- Lake St. Croix Beach (1,005)
- Hilltop (960)
- Martin Lake* (907)
- Vineland* (869)
- Landfall (847)
- Birchwood Village (845)
- Lilydale (845)
- Onamia (839)
- Isle (830)
- Cleveland (772)
- Elysian (765)
- Kasota (728)
- Greenwood (725)
- Hampton (714)
- Clear Lake (689)
- Marine on St. Croix (661)
- Center City (634)
- Loretto (613)
- Foreston (581)
- Hamburg (547)
- Minnetonka Beach (547)
- Sunfish Lake (522)
- Willernie (513)
- Gem Lake (511)
- Bethel (484)
- Randolph (460)
- New Germany (446)
- Vermillion (428)
- Pine Springs (381)
- Woodland (379)
- Houlton, WI* (377)
- Crown College* (367)
- Hager City, WI* (357)
- St. Marys Point (343)
- Lakeland Shores (327)
- Mendota (269)
- Silver Creek* (256)
- Wahkon (251)
- Pease (249)
- Diamond Bluff, WI* (184)
- South Haven (184)
- Kilkenny (153)
- Emerald, WI* (145)
- Coates (137)
- Heidelberg (134)
- Miesville (128)
- Stanchfield* (103)
- Bock (82)
- New Trier (81)

== Culture ==
=== Fine and performing arts ===
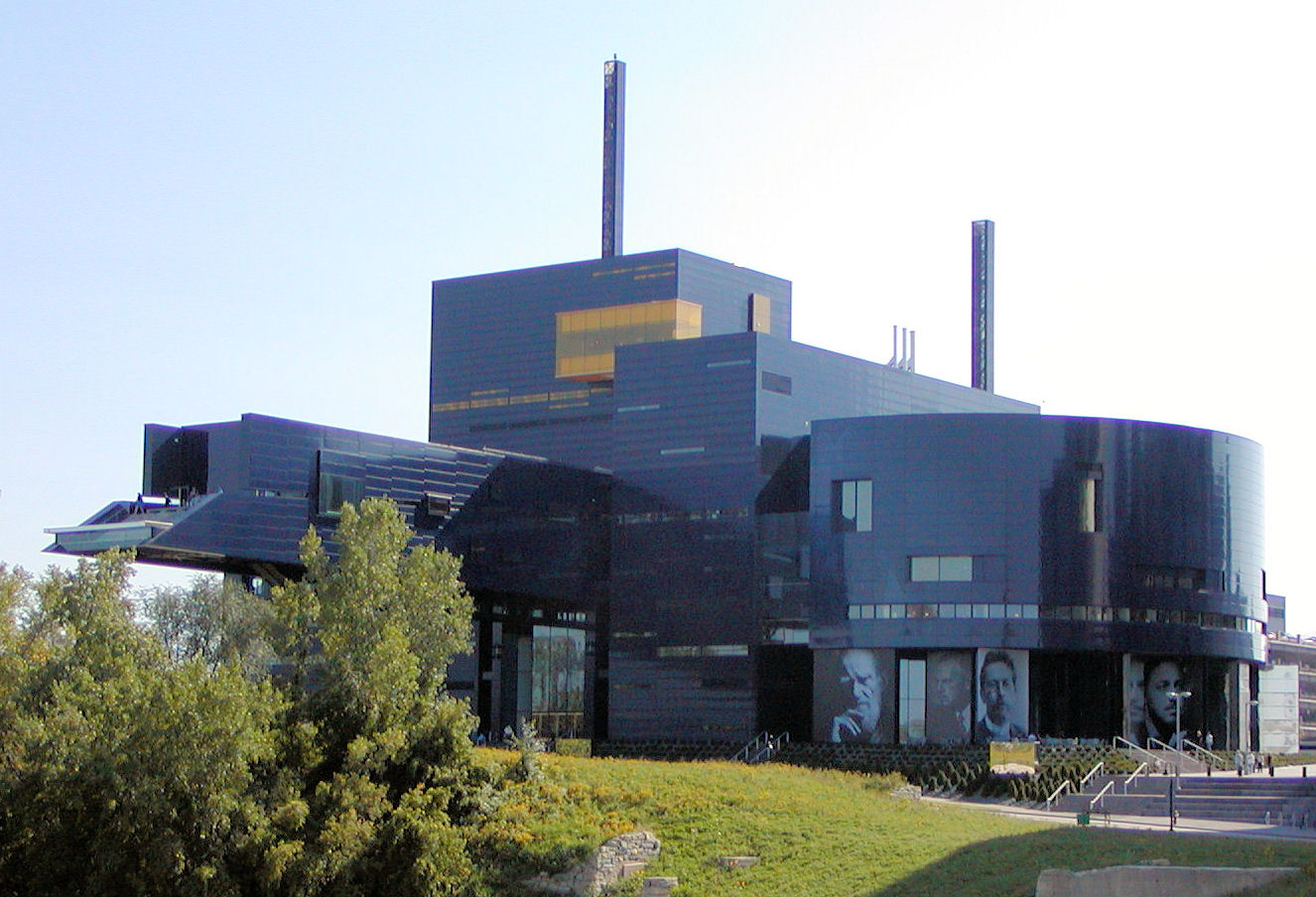
Guthrie Theater on the Mississippi River in Minneapolis

The Minneapolis–Saint Paul metropolitan area fine art museums include the Minneapolis Institute of Art, the Walker Art Center, the Frederick R. Weisman Art Museum, Minnesota Museum of American Art and The Museum of Russian Art. Other museums include American Swedish Institute, Science Museum of Minnesota, Minnesota Children's Museum, Bell Museum (natural history and planetarium) and The Bakken Museum (science and technology). The Minnesota Orchestra and the Saint Paul Chamber Orchestra are full-time professional musical ensembles. The Guthrie Theater is a world-class regional theater overlooking the Mississippi River. The Minnesota Fringe Festival is an annual celebration of theatre, dance, improvisation, puppetry, kids' shows, visual art, and musicals.

The Twin Cities is also the home of Minnesota Public Radio (MPR), the nation's second-largest public radio station. It has both a classical station and a contemporary station, The Current, which plays music from regional and other contemporary artists. The MPR program A Prairie Home Companion, hosted by Minnesota native Garrison Keillor, aired live for many years from the Fitzgerald Theater in Saint Paul. The show ended its run in 2016, with its successor Live from Here also airing from the same venue. This radio program was the basis of the 2006 film A Prairie Home Companion.

The Brave New Workshop Comedy Theater is a sketch and improvisational comedy theater in Minneapolis. It is the nation's oldest comedy theater.

The Current and the Walker Art Center host the annual music festival Rock the Garden, which features nationally recognized and local artists. The festival has been held annually since 2008 and has featured artists such as Lizzo, Hippo Campus, Chance the Rapper, Bon Iver, The Flaming Lips, Wilco and Sonic Youth.

The Basilica of Saint Mary in Minneapolis hosts the annual Basilica Block Party, another music festival, which has featured nationally recognized artists such as Weezer, Andy Grammer, Death Cab for Cutie and Panic! at the Disco. The festival is used as a fundraiser for the restoration of the basilica. The event draws about 25,000 people to the downtown area.

The Twin Cities area has a number of venues where artists come to perform. Minneapolis is home to First Avenue. First Avenue is known for being the starting venue for many famous artists and bands from the area, including Prince, The Replacements, Atmosphere, and Manny Phesto. It became one of the most recognizable venues in Minnesota after the release of the Prince movie Purple Rain, in which it is featured.

=== Outdoors ===
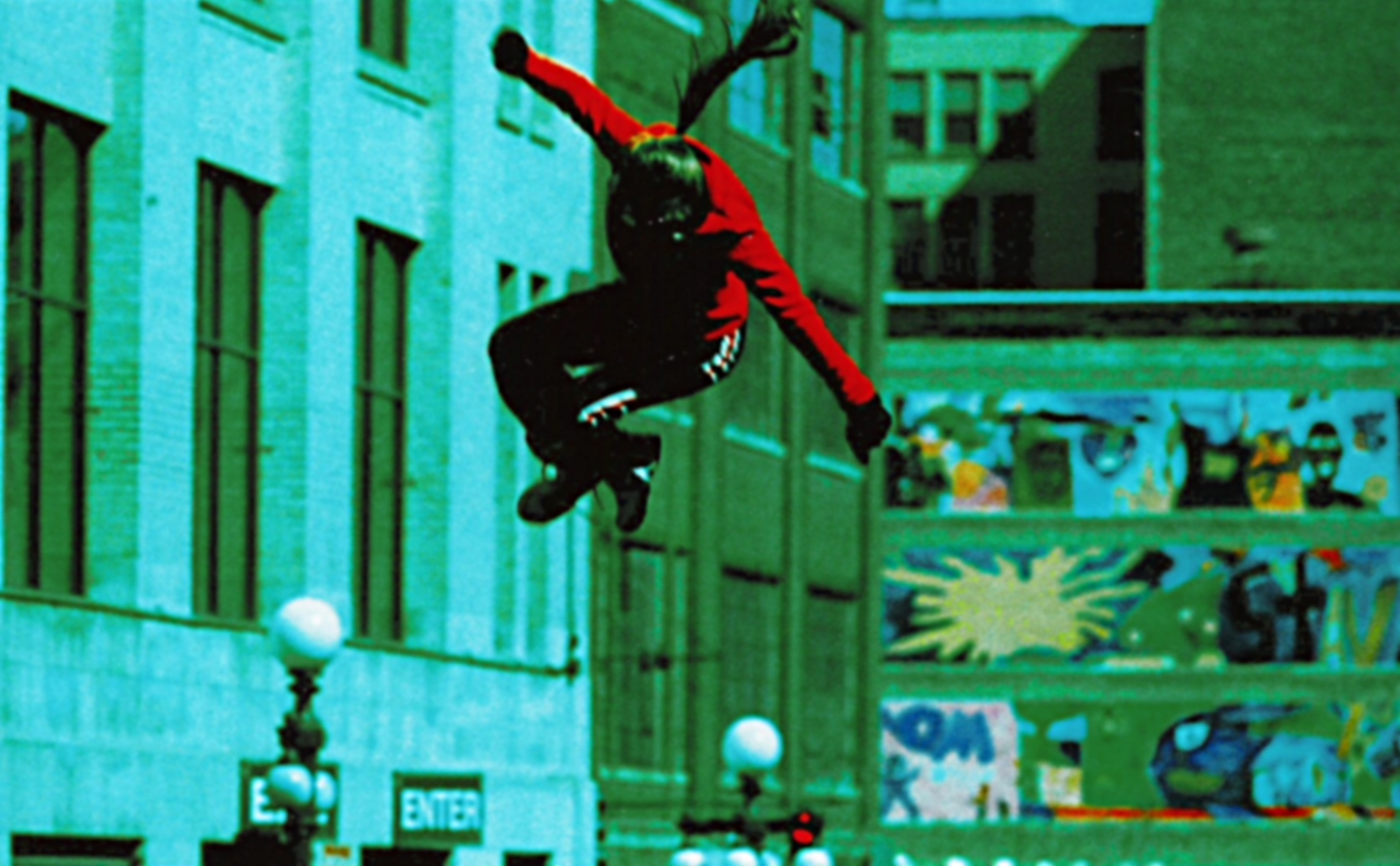
A Saint Paul Bouncing Team aerialist exhibition in St. Paul

There are numerous lakes in the region, and some cities in the area have extensive park systems for recreation. Organized recreation includes the Great River Energy bicycle festival, the Twin Cities Marathon, and the U.S. pond hockey championships. Some studies have shown that area residents take advantage of this, and are among the most physically fit in the country, but others have disputed that. Medicine is a major industry in the region and the southeasterly city of Rochester, as the University of Minnesota has joined other colleges and hospitals in doing significant research, and major medical device manufacturers started in the region (the most prominent is Medtronic). Technical innovators have brought important advances in computing, including the Cray line of supercomputers.

Many Twin Cities residents own or share cabins and other properties along lakes and forested areas in central and northern Minnesota, and weekend trips "up North" happen in the warmer months. Ice fishing is a major winter pastime, although overambitious fishers sometimes find themselves in danger when they venture onto the ice too early or too late. Hunting, snowmobiling, ATV riding and other outdoor activities are also popular. This connection to the outdoors also brings a strong sense of environmentalism to many Minnesotans.

In 2011 and 2012, the American College of Sports Medicine named Minneapolis–Saint Paul the nation's healthiest metropolitan area.

=== Sports ===
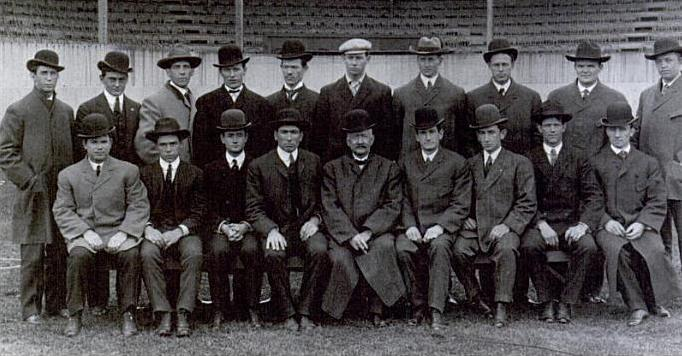
The 1905 Minneapolis Millers baseball team

The Twin Cities is one of 12 American metropolitan areas with teams in all four major professional sports—baseball (MLB), football (NFL), basketball (NBA) and ice hockey (NHL). Including Major League Soccer (MLS), it is one of 11 metro areas with five major professional sports teams. To avoid favoring either city, most teams based in the area use only the word "Minnesota" in their names, rather than "Minneapolis" or "St. Paul".

Minneapolis was the site of two Super Bowls—Super Bowl XXVI in 1992 and Super Bowl LII in 2018. It is the farthest north that a Super Bowl has ever been played. The Minnesota Vikings have played in four Super Bowls—IV in 1970, VIII in 1974, IX in 1975 and XI in 1977.

The World Series has been played in the Twin Cities three times—1965, 1987 and 1991—as have three Major League Baseball All-Star Games—1965, 1985 and 2014. NHL All-Star games were hosted in 1972 and 2004, NBA All-Star game in 1994, WNBA All-Star game in 2018 and MLS All-Star game in 2022.

The Stanley Cup Final has been played in the Twin Cities twice, in 1981 and 1991. The NHL Stadium Series had a game in the Twin Cities in 2016, and the NHL Winter Classic was played at Target Field in 2022.

The Final Four Men's National College Athletics Association (NCAA) basketball tournament has been hosted by Minneapolis four times—1951, 1992, 2001 and 2019—and the Women's twice, in 1995 and 2022.

The Frozen Four Men's NCAA hockey tournament has been hosted by the Twin Cities nine times—1958, 1966, 1989, 1991, 1994, 2002, 2011, 2018 and 2024.

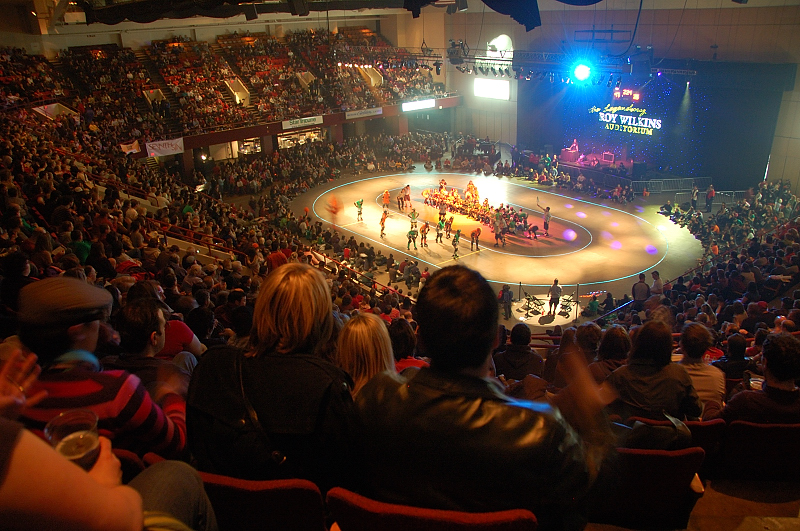
Over 3,700 fans attend the opening bout of the 2007 Minnesota RollerGirls season

Major golf tournaments hosted in the Twin Cities include: U.S. Open—1916, 1930, 1970, 1991; U.S. Women's Open—1966, 1977, 2008; PGA Championship—1932, 1954, 2002, 2009; Women's PGA Championship, 2019; Walker Cup, 1957; Solheim Cup, 2002; and the Ryder Cup, 2016. The Ryder Cup is scheduled to return in 2029.

The 1998 World Figure Skating Championships were held at the Target Center in Minneapolis.

The 2017, 2018 and 2019 X Games were held in Minneapolis. The 2020 X Games were canceled due to the COVID-19 pandemic.

The Twin Cities host three nationally competing Roller Derby leagues: the Minnesota Roller Derby of the Women's Flat Track Derby Association Division 1, the North Star Roller Derby of WFTDA Division 2, and Minnesota Men's Roller Derby, a league of the Men's Roller Derby Association. MNRD and NSRD have four home teams each: the Dagger Dolls, Garda Belts, Rockits, and Atomic Bombshells of MNRD and the Banger Sisters, Delta Delta Di, Kilmores, and Violent Femmes of NSRD, as well as two traveling teams each. MMRD has three home teams: The Gentlemen's Club, Destruction Workers, and Thunderjacks, and two traveling teams.

The annual Twin Cities Marathon is held in the fall with a course running through Minneapolis and Saint Paul. Minneapolis was the birthplace of Rollerblade and is a center for inline skating, as well as home to the most golfers per capita of any U.S. city. Additionally, water skiing got its start on Lake Pepin, a lake southeast of the metropolitan area, in the Mississippi River about 50 miles (80 km) downstream from Saint Paul.

Some other sports teams gained their names from being in Minnesota before relocating. The Los Angeles Lakers get their name from once being based in Minneapolis, the City of Lakes. The Dallas Stars also derived their name from their tenure as a Minnesota team, the Minnesota North Stars.

==== Professional sports teams in Minneapolis–Saint Paul ====
Club	Sport	League	Venue	City	Since	Titles
Minnesota Twins	Baseball	American League; Major League Baseball	Target Field	Minneapolis	1961	1987, 1991
St. Paul Saints	Baseball	International League; Minor League Baseball	CHS Field	St. Paul	1993–2005 (NL); 2006-2020 (AA); 2021	1993, 1995, 1996, 2004 (NL); 2019 (AA)
Minnesota Vikings	American football	National Football League	U.S. Bank Stadium	Minneapolis	1961	1969 (Not Super Bowl)
Minnesota Vixen	American football	Women's Football Alliance	Sea Foam Stadium	St. Paul	1999	
Minnesota Timberwolves	Basketball	National Basketball Association	Target Center	Minneapolis	1989	
Minnesota Lynx	Basketball	Women's National Basketball Association	Target Center	Minneapolis	1999	2011, 2013, 2015, 2017
Minnesota Wild	Ice hockey	National Hockey League	Grand Casino Arena	St. Paul	2000	
Minnesota Frost	Ice hockey	Professional Women's Hockey League	Grand Casino Arena	St. Paul	2023	2024, 2025
Minnesota United FC	Soccer	Major League Soccer	Allianz Field	St. Paul	2011–2016 (NASL); 2017	2011 (NASL)
Minnesota Aurora FC	Soccer	USL W League	TCO Stadium	Eagan	2021	
Minnesota Forge	Volleyball	Major League Volleyball	Grand Casino Arena	St. Paul	2027	
Minnesota Wind Chill	Ultimate Frisbee	Ultimate Frisbee Association	Sea Foam Stadium	St. Paul	2013	2024

The Twin Cities are also home of the University of Minnesota Golden Gophers who play in the Big Ten Conference.

=== Media ===
==== Print ====
The Twin Cities have two major daily newspapers: The Minnesota Star Tribune and the Saint Paul Pioneer Press. The Minnesota Daily serves the University of Minnesota's Twin Cities campus and surrounding neighborhoods. There is one general-interest neighborhood weekly newspaper still in the cities: The East Side Review, devoted to the 90,000 residents in St. Paul's eastern third. Other weekly papers are devoted to specific audiences/demographics, including (until 2020) City Pages.

==== Television ====
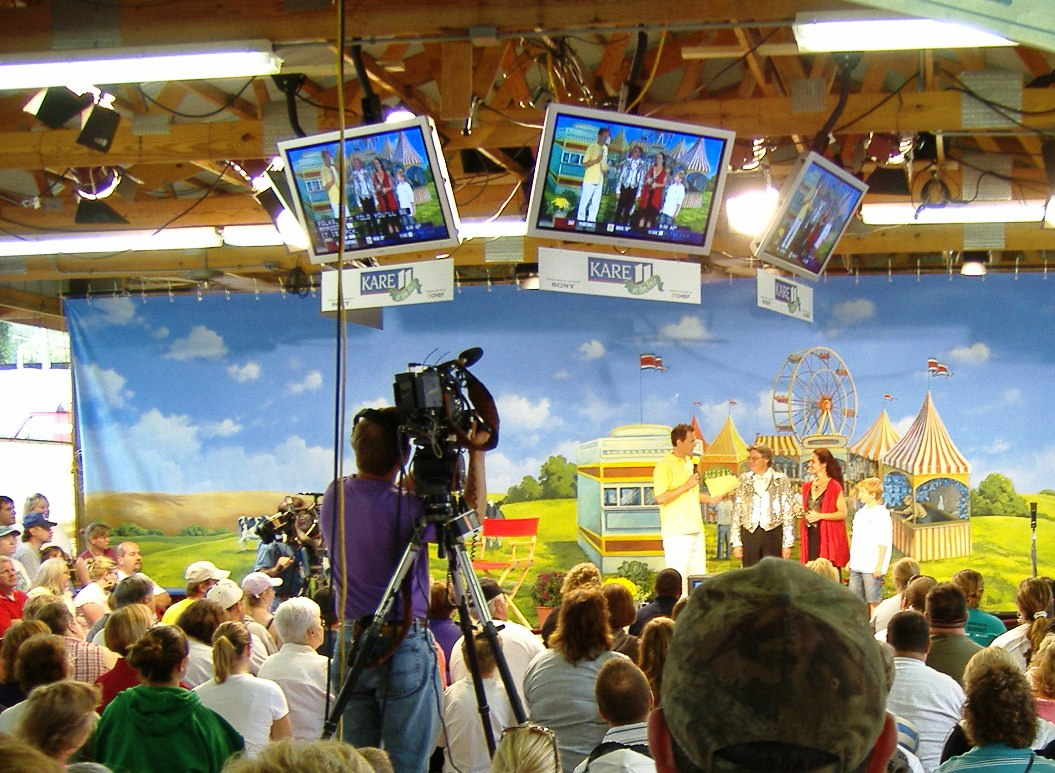
KARE television broadcast, Minnesota State Fair

The region is the 15th-largest television market, according to Nielsen Media Research. Three duopolies exist in the Twin Cities: Twin Cities PBS operates KTCA and KTCI (channels 2.1 and 2.4), (Note: KTCI formerly transmitted on UHF channel 17 from its May 1965 sign-on until February 2009, when both stations unified their respective digital channels as virtual subchannels of KTCA (mapped to 2.x, corresponding to the latter's existing virtual channel and former analog VHF allocation), while continuing to operate on separate physical channels (16 and 34, respectively).) Saint Paul-based Hubbard Broadcasting (founded by Stanley E. Hubbard) owns ABC affiliate KSTP-TV (channel 5) and independent station KSTC-TV (channel 5.2), (Note: KSTC formerly transmitted on UHF channel 45 from its June 1994 sign-on (as KVBM) until October 2011, when both stations unified their respective digital channels as virtual subchannels of KSTP (mapped to 5.x, corresponding to the latter's existing virtual channel and former analog VHF allocation), while continuing to operate on separate physical channels (45 and 30, respectively).) and Fox Television Stations operates Fox owned-and-operated station KMSP-TV (channel 9) and MyNetworkTV O&O WFTC (channel 9.2). (Note: WFTC formerly transmitted on UHF channel 29 from its October 1982 sign-on (as WFBT) until June 2014, when both stations unified their respective digital channels as virtual subchannels of KMSP (mapped to 9.x, corresponding to the latter's existing virtual channel and former analog VHF allocation), while continuing to operate on separate physical channels (29 and 9, respectively).) Diversified from radio, KSTP-TV was the first television station to operate in the region and the 17th to sign on in the U.S., initially reaching 3,000 sets when Hubbard signed on the station in April 1948.

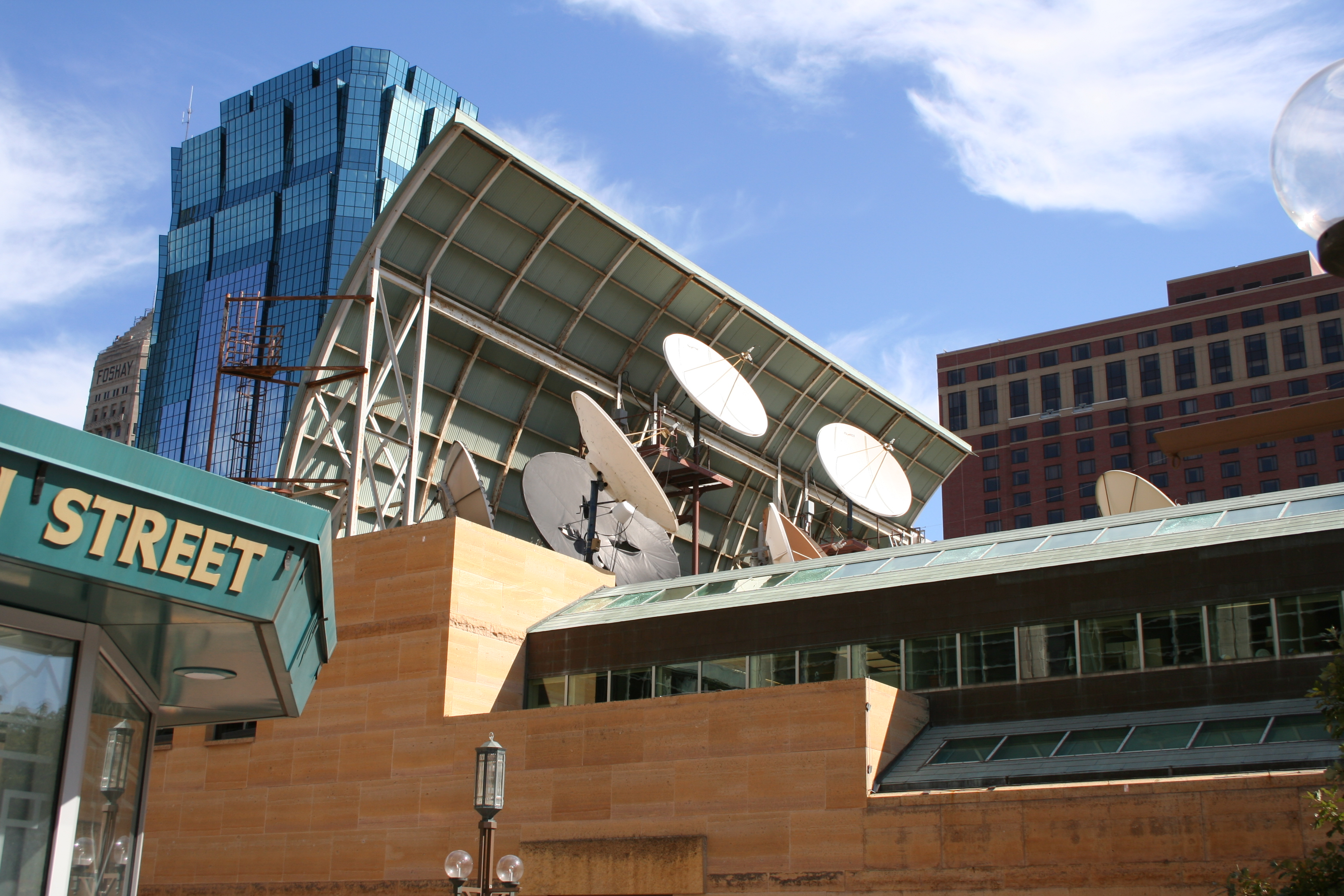
WCCO-TV building in Minneapolis.

Two local television stations in the area operate their main studios in Minneapolis: CBS O&O WCCO-TV (channel 4) and CW affiliate WUCW (channel 23, owned by Sinclair Broadcast Group). Saint Paul is home to KSTP/KSTC and KTCA/KTCI. The other major television stations are based in nearby suburban areas: NBC affiliate KARE (channel 11, owned by Tegna) operates a broadcasting complex in Golden Valley, while KMSP/WFTC operates from a facility in Eden Prairie.

For much of the last two decades, WCCO and KARE have had the most popular evening newscasts in the area, while KSTP has struggled to maintain decent ratings on its news programs. Since becoming an independent station in 1979, after losing the ABC affiliation to KSTP in a three-station affiliation swap that resulted in NBC moving from KSTP to then-independent WTCN (now KARE), KMSP has carried a nightly prime time newscast (originally airing at 9:30 p.m. before moving to 9:00 p.m. upon trading time slots with the now-canceled Independent Network News in 1982). It remained the top-rated newscast in the 9:00 hour long after it gained competition from then-Fox affiliate WFTC (which launched a standalone news department in April 2001, later absorbed into KMSP's existing news operation after Fox acquired both stations that year from Clear Channel Television and United Television, respectively) and independent KSTC (which began airing a newscast produced by sister station KSTP in 2001).

Communities in the region have their own public, educational, and government access (PEG) cable television channels. One, the Metro Cable Network, is available on channel 6 on cable systems across the seven-county region.

Several television programs that originated in the Twin Cities have aired nationally on broadcast and cable networks. KTCA created the science program Newton's Apple and distributes a children's program today. A few unusual comedic shows also originated in the area. In the 1980s, KTMA (later KLGT and KMWB, now WUCW) created a number of low-budget shows, including Mystery Science Theater 3000, a satirical B-movie showcase that achieved cult classic status during its 1989–96 national cable run on Comedy Central. The short-lived Let's Bowl started on KARE and later ran on KLGT and St. Cloud-licensed KXLI-TV (channel 41, now Ion O&O KPXM-TV), before airing on Comedy Central from 2001 to 2002; it was a panel discussion featuring critical and humorous analysis of TV commercials. The advertising-focused panel discussion series Mental Engineering originated on the Saint Paul Neighborhood Network (SPNN) cable access channel in 1997 before being syndicated nationally to PBS member stations from 2001 to 2008.

From 1984 to 2002, Hubbard Broadcasting and Viacom operated CONUS Communications, a satellite news gathering and news video-sharing service for local television stations throughout the nation. In 1989, the venture launched All News Channel (ANC), a syndicated television news service that operated from the company's St. Paul broadcast facility and used some on-air staff previously employed by KSTP. Similar in format to then-competitor CNN Headline News (now HLN), ANC produced rolling half-hour national newscasts that were syndicated to local stations (most of which, as KSTP did throughout its existence, aired them as overnight filler programming); Hubbard shut down most of CONUS's operations and ANC in 2002, citing the dominance of network-run affiliate wire services (such as CNN Newsource), but it maintains a digital archive of its news library.

In 1994, Hubbard launched United States Satellite Broadcasting (USSB), a satellite television provider offering premium channels from Home Box Office, Inc. and Showtime Networks, pay-per-view movies and events, a limited selection of basic cable channels (mainly those in which Viacom held full or partial ownership interest, such as MTV, Lifetime and Nickelodeon), and All News Channel. Founded in 1981 by then-Hubbard President Stanley S. Hubbard, USSB and competitor DirecTV used the Digital Satellite System (DSS) infrastructure, allowing customers to optionally subscribe to both services. Hubbard sold USSB's assets to then-DirecTV parent Hughes Electronics in 1999, leading the latter provider to add USSB's remaining channels. (Viacom moved its basic channels over to DirecTV the previous year.)

==== Radio ====
The Twin Cities radio market was ranked 15th by Nielsen in 2018. In November 2018, the area's top five morning radio shows were all FM stations: KSTP (94.5), KFXN (100.3), KQQL (107.9), KDWB (101.3), and KXXR (93.7). Three of those stations are owned by iHeartRadio. Most stations broadcast on air and online, as livestreams from their websites.

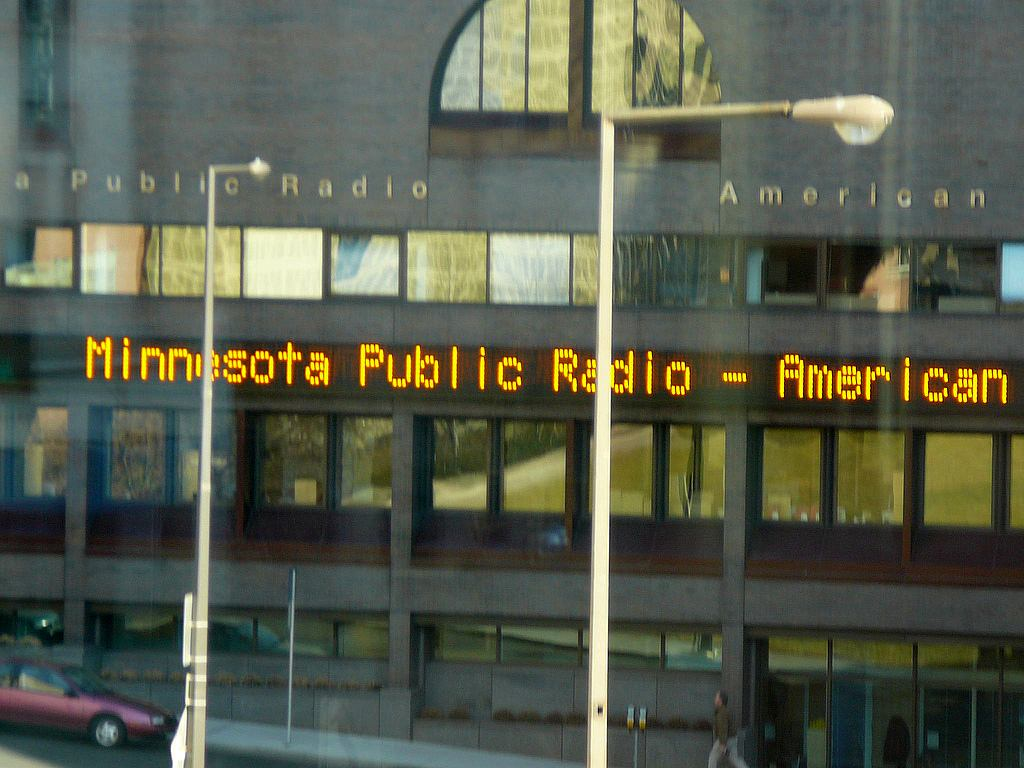
Minnesota Public Radio in St. Paul

In addition to owning KSTP television, Hubbard Broadcasting also operates two radio stations that share call letters (which reference their shared licensed city, St. Paul) with its co-owned television outlet: KSTP (1500 AM) maintains a sports radio format as an ESPN Radio affiliate, and KSTP-FM maintains a pop music format. In 1985, Hubbard—valued at $400 million—was one of the nation's larger corporate media companies; in 2005, valued at $1.2 billion, Hubbard was a fairly small major-market media operation.

The Twin Cities have a mix of commercial and non-commercial radio stations. The market is dominated by iHeartMedia, which operates seven stations (including contemporary hits outlet KDWB, sports radio outlet KFXN, classic hits outlet KQQL, and news/talk station KTLK). Multiple small, independent stations are award winners, including KUOM (770 AM; relayed in St. Paul on 100.7 FM and in Minneapolis on 104.5 FM), operated by the University of Minnesota, community radio outlet KFAI (90.3) in Cedar–Riverside, and African American-oriented community station KMOJ (89.9 FM) in North Minneapolis.

Minnesota Public Radio (MPR)—a regional public radio network that transmits on 46 affiliate stations across the state—broadcasts on three stations in the area, each with distinct programming formats: KNOW (91.1 FM) serves as the flagship station of MPR's news and information service, MPR News, featuring locally produced and NPR-distributed news and talk programs; KSJN (99.5 FM) serves as the flagship of MPR's classical music service, "YourClassical MPR"; and Northfield-licensed KCMP (89.3 FM) maintains an adult album alternative format branded as "The Current". (In addition to being relayed on MPR stations in Duluth and Rochester, KCMP's "Current" programming is also carried in the Los Angeles market on an HD subchannel of educational FM station KPCC.) MPR was first nationally known for the variety show A Prairie Home Companion, which ceased production in 2016. Doing business as American Public Media, the company is the second-largest producer of NPR content, after National Public Radio (of which MPR is an affiliate).

==== Independent media ====
The Twin Cities is home to many independent media organizations, including The UpTake and MinnPost.

== Demographics ==
=== Population ===
MSA Historical Population
Census	Pop.	Note	%±
1850	4,491		—
1860	77,565		1,627.1%
1870	167,674		116.2%
1880	284,766		69.8%
1890	540,232		89.7%
1900	649,735		20.3%
1910	808,388		24.4%
1920	921,031		13.9%
1930	1,069,845		16.2%
1940	1,162,361		8.6%
1950	1,346,285		15.8%
1960	1,697,403		26.1%
1970	2,079,826		22.5%
1980	2,255,502		8.4%
1990	2,595,799		15.1%
2000	3,031,918		16.8%
2010	3,346,859		10.4%
2020	3,690,261		10.3%
2022 (est.)	3,693,729		0.1%
Note: This is the historical population of the counties currently making up the metropolitan area, not the size of the metropolitan area at the time. U.S. Decennial Census; 1790–1960 1900–1990; 1990–2000 2010–2020

CSA Historical Population
Census	Pop.	Note	%±
1850	4,909		—
1860	100,503		1,947.3%
1870	227,182		126.0%
1880	374,208		64.7%
1890	651,160		74.0%
1900	780,923		19.9%
1910	943,975		20.9%
1920	1,070,395		13.4%
1930	1,228,835		14.8%
1940	1,330,771		8.3%
1950	1,523,428		14.5%
1960	1,891,459		24.2%
1970	2,300,115		21.6%
1980	2,503,343		8.8%
1990	2,866,678		14.5%
2000	3,335,000		16.3%
2010	3,682,928		10.4%
2020	4,078,788		10.7%
2022 (est.)	4,080,232		0.0%
Note: This is the historical population of the counties currently making up the CSA, not the size of the metropolitan area at the time. U.S. Decennial Census; 1790–1960 1900–1990; 1990–2000 2010–2020

=== Place of birth ===
About 93% of the metropolitan area's population is native to the United States, including 0.6% born in Puerto Rico, a U.S. territory, or abroad to American parents. The rest of the population is foreign-born.

The highest percentages of immigrants came from Asia (38.2%), Latin America (25.4%), and Africa (20.1%); smaller percentages of newcomers came from Europe (13.1%), other parts of North America (3.0%), and Oceania (0.2%).

=== Religion ===
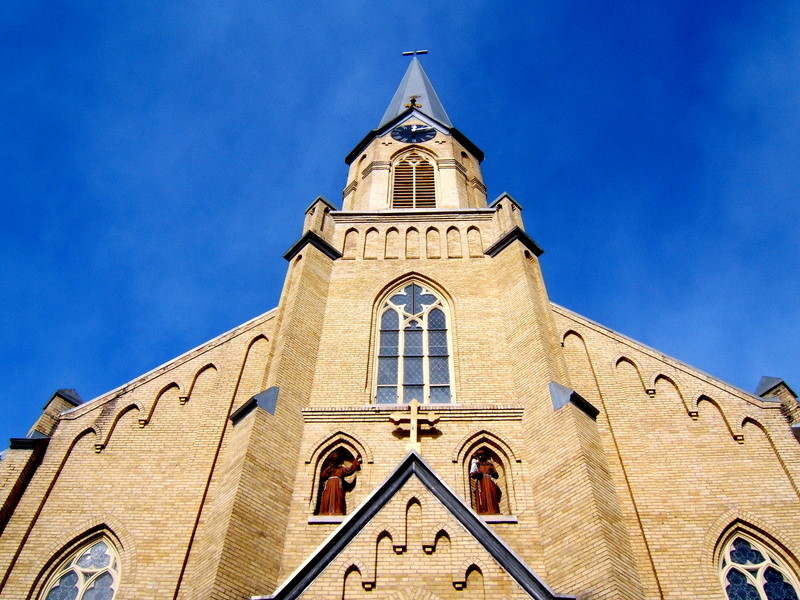
Guardian Angels Catholic Church in Chaska

Minneapolis–Saint Paul is a major center for religion in the state, especially Christianity. The state headquarters of five major Christian churches are there: the Roman Catholic Archdiocese of Saint Paul and Minneapolis, the Episcopal Diocese of Minnesota, the Presbyterian Synod of Lakes and Prairies, and the Church of Jesus Christ of Latter-day Saints (LDS Church). The Presbyterian and LDS churches both have missions in Saint Paul, Minneapolis, and Bloomington, as does the Orthodox Church in America.

The headquarters of the former American Lutheran Church (ALC), Evangelical Lutheran Church, Lutheran Free Church and the Augustana Evangelical Lutheran Church were in Minneapolis; the headquarters of Augsburg Fortress publishing house still is. The Minneapolis Area Synod and the Saint Paul Area Synod are the largest and third-largest synods of the Evangelical Lutheran Church in America (ELCA), respectively.

The Evangelical Free Church of America is headquartered in Bloomington, and the Association of Free Lutheran Congregations is headquartered in Plymouth, along with its seminary and a Bible School.

The Twin Cities are home to a Jewish population of approximately 64,800, with about 31% of Jewish households in Minneapolis suburbs, 24% in Minneapolis, 16% in St. Paul, 14% in the St. Paul suburbs, and 15% in outer suburbs. There is also a Hindu temple in the Twin Cities suburb of Maple Grove. The Twin Cities' sole Sikh gurdwara is in Bloomington. A recent influx of immigrants from Laos and North Africa has brought many more religions to the area. There are several Islamic masjids in the area. There is a temple for the religion of Eckankar in the suburb of Chanhassen known as the Temple of Eck. In addition, many Hmong and Tibetan Buddhist peoples live in Saint Paul; a Hmong Buddhist temple opened in suburban Roseville in 1995. The LDS St. Paul Minnesota Temple opened in Oakdale, a suburb east of Saint Paul, in 2000. There are several Unitarian Universalist communities, such as the First Unitarian Society of Minneapolis, as well as several Pagan and Buddhist groups. Minneapolis–Saint Paul has been called Paganistan due to the large numbers of Pagans living there. An estimated 20,000 Pagans live in the area.

Minneapolis is where the Billy Graham Evangelistic Association started and was its home for more than 50 years.

== Politics ==
Minneapolis and Saint Paul have each hosted a national political convention. The 2008 Republican National Convention was held at the Xcel Energy Center in Saint Paul. Minneapolis hosted the 1892 Republican National Convention at the Industrial Exposition Building.

Presidential elections results in the Minneapolis–Saint Paul metropolitan area
Year	Democratic	Republican	Third parties
2024	61.3% 1,101,219	36.1% 648,191	2.6% 47,911
2020	64.7% 1,151,270	30.7% 546,632	4.6% 82,186
2016	55.3% 910,105	35.8% 589,018	8.9% 146,155
2012	56.9% 934,437	40.8% 670,433	2.3% 37,955
2008	58.0% 927,825	40.3% 644,931	1.7% 27,725
2004	54.6% 842,339	44.3% 683,336	1.2% 18,250
2000	51.0% 679,125	42.5% 566,078	6.5% 86,612
1996	53.5% 631,387	33.6% 396,163	12.9% 152,329
1992	45.9% 583,255	30.5% 387,262	23.6% 299,436
1988	54.8% 611,367	44.2% 493,864	1.0% 10,944
1984	52.2% 558,158	47.2% 504,867	0.6% 6,887
1980	49.1% 494,701	38.7% 389,211	12.2% 123,090
1976	55.1% 527,428	41.8% 399,846	3.0% 29,089
1972	47.3% 398,544	50.4% 424,178	2.3% 19,122

Like most major metropolitan areas, the Twin Cities is a stronghold for the Democratic Party, known in Minnesota as the Democratic-Farmer-Labor Party. At the state level, DFLers in the Minnesota legislature have increasingly relied on the Twin Cities to build majorities. Outside of the staunchly liberal urban core, the suburbs of the Twin Cities have been historically competitive for both the DFL and the Republicans.

== Economy ==
The Minneapolis–Saint Paul area is home to 23 Fortune 1000 headquarters. The 2025 rankings are:

MSP Rank	Company	City	Sector	Fortune Rank
1	United Health Group	Eden Prairie	Healthcare	3
2	Target	Minneapolis	Retailing	41
3	US Bank	Minneapolis	Banking	105
4	Best Buy	Richfield	Retailing	108
5	CHS	Inver Grove Heights	Agricultural coop	115
6	3M	Maplewood	Industrial	174
7	General Mills	Golden Valley	Food	216
8	Ameriprise	Minneapolis	Financial	230
9	C H Robinson	Eden Prairie	Logistics	233
10	Land O' Lakes	Arden Hills	Agricultural coop	262
11	Ecolab	St. Paul	Industrial	274
12	Xcel Energy	Minneapolis	Energy	319
13	Thrivent Financial	Minneapolis	Financial	388
14	Solventum	Eagan	Medical products	462
15	Securian Financial Group	St. Paul	Financial	464
16	Polaris	Medina	Recreational equipment	508
17	APi Group	New Brighton	Construction	521
18	Patterson	Mendota Heights	Wholesale healthcare	543
19	Toro	Bloomington	Lawn equipment	706
20	Donaldson Company	Bloomington	Filtration	833
21	H.B. Fuller	Vadnais Heights	Adhesives	839
22	Winnebago Industries	Eden Prairie	Recreational equipment	920
23	Vista Outdoor	Anoka	Recreational equipment	974

Private companies headquartered in the Twin Cities area include Cargill, the country's largest private company, Carlson, Holiday Stationstores, and Andersen. Foreign companies with U.S. headquarters in the Twin Cities include Aimia, Allianz Life, Canadian Pacific, Coloplast, Medtronic, Pearson VUE and Pentair.

The Twin Cities' economy is the nation's 13th-largest and ranks second in the Midwest after Chicago. The Minneapolis–Saint Paul area is also North America's second-largest medical device manufacturing center and the fourth-largest U.S. banking center, based on total assets of banks headquartered in the area, after New York, San Francisco, and Charlotte.

The Federal Reserve Bank of Minneapolis covers the 9th District of the Federal Reserve System, which is made up of Minnesota, Montana, North and South Dakota, northwestern Wisconsin, and the Upper Peninsula of Michigan. Its geographical territory is the third-largest of the 12 Federal Reserve banks.

== Education ==
=== Colleges and universities ===
- Adler Graduate School – Minnetonka
- Anoka-Ramsey Community College – Coon Rapids and Cambridge
- Anoka Technical College – Anoka
- Augsburg University – Minneapolis
- Bethany Global University - Bloomington
- Bethel University – Arden Hills
- Capella University – Minneapolis
- Century College – White Bear Lake
- Concordia University – Saint Paul
- Crown College – near St. Bonifacius
- Dakota County Technical College – Rosemount
- Dunwoody College of Technology – Minneapolis
- Hamline University – Saint Paul
- Hennepin Technical College – Eden Prairie and Brooklyn Park
- Inver Hills Community College – Inver Grove Heights
- Luther Seminary – Saint Paul
- Macalester College – Saint Paul
- Metropolitan State University – Saint Paul and Minneapolis
- Minneapolis College of Art and Design – Minneapolis
- Minneapolis College – Minneapolis
- Minnesota State University – Edina
- Mitchell Hamline School of Law – Saint Paul
- Normandale Community College – Bloomington
- North Central University – Minneapolis
- North Hennepin Community College – Brooklyn Park
- Northwestern Health Sciences University – Bloomington
- Rasmussen University – Bloomington, Blaine, Brooklyn Park, Eagan and Lake Elmo
- St. Catherine University – Saint Paul and Minneapolis
- St. Cloud State University – St. Cloud and Maple Grove
- St. Mary's University of Minnesota – Minneapolis
- Saint Paul College – Saint Paul
- United Theological Seminary – Saint Paul
- University of Minnesota – Minneapolis and Saint Paul (Falcon Heights)
- University of Northwestern – St. Paul – Roseville
- University of St. Thomas – Saint Paul and Minneapolis
- University of Wisconsin – River Falls and Hudson
- Walden University – Minneapolis

=== Libraries ===
==== Libraries, with numbers of branches ====
- Anoka County Library – 9
- Bayport Public Library – 1
- Carver County Library – 6
- Dakota County Library – 10
- East Central Regional Library – 8
- Hennepin County Library – 41
- Ramsey County Library – 7
- St. Paul Public Library – 13
- Scott County Library – 7
- Stillwater Public Library – 1
- Washington County Library – 7

== Infrastructure ==
=== Buildings and structures ===
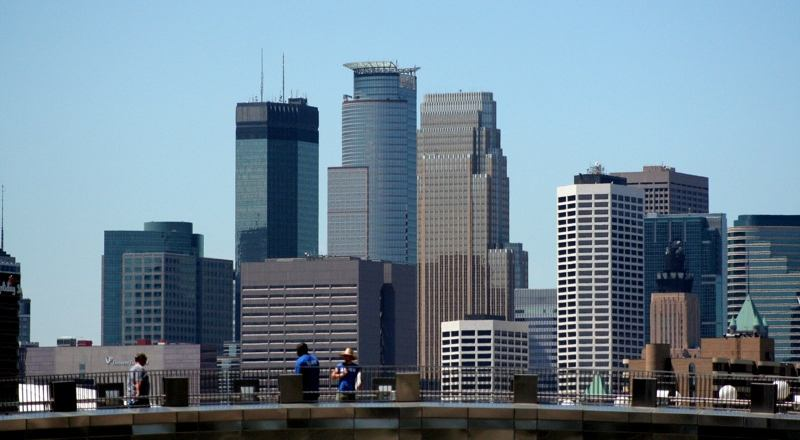
The tallest buildings in Minneapolis are, left to right, the IDS Center, Capella Tower and the Wells Fargo Center.

The 11 tallest buildings and 16 of the 17 tallest buildings in the area are in downtown Minneapolis. There is some dispute over which building is the tallest—most Minnesotans think of the IDS Center if asked, but most sources seem to agree that Capella Tower is slightly taller. In early 2005, it was found that the IDS Center is taller by a 16-foot (5 m) washroom garage on top, bringing its height to 792 feet (241 m). Capella Tower and the Wells Fargo Center differ in height by a foot or two. The tallest building in St. Paul is Wells Fargo Place, at 471 feet (144 m).

Buildings have gone up and been torn down rapidly across the region. Some city blocks have been demolished six or seven times since the mid-19th century. No single architectural style dominates the region. The cities have a mishmash of different designs, although structures from a few eras stand out. There were once many stone buildings in the Richardsonian Romanesque style (or at least Romanesque-inspired variants). Minneapolis City Hall is one prominent example of this, though buildings of all types—including personal residences such as the James J. Hill House—were similarly designed.

A few decades later, several Art Deco structures were built, including St. Paul City Hall, the Foshay Tower, and the Minneapolis Post Office. The two cities' architecture varies greatly. In Minneapolis, the trend has been toward sleek lines and modern glass facades, while Saint Paul tends to follow a more traditional style to better accompany its older structures.

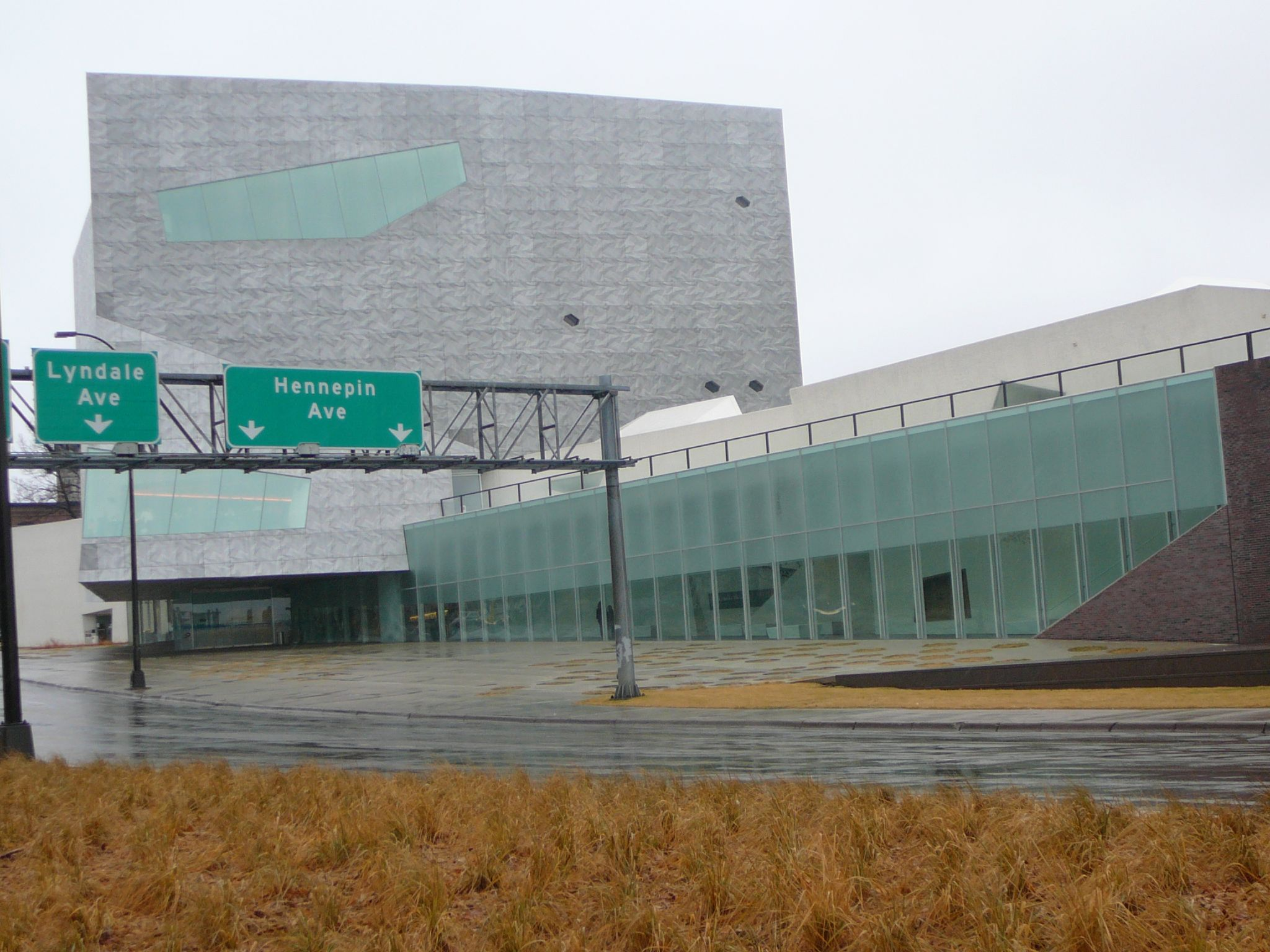
The Walker Art Center on Hennepin Avenue in Minneapolis

Saint Paul and especially Minneapolis underwent massive urban renewal projects in the post-World War II era, so a vast number of buildings are now lost. Some of the larger and more durable structures have survived. The area might be signified more by bridges than buildings. A series of reinforced concrete arch spans crossing the Mississippi River were built in the 1920s and 1930s. They still carry daily traffic. Many have undergone major repair work but retain the original design. Several are listed on the National Register of Historic Places, including the 10th Avenue Bridge, Intercity Bridge (Ford Parkway), Robert Street Bridge, and the longest, the 4,119 ft (1,255 m) Mendota Bridge. The area is also noted for having the first known permanent crossing of the Mississippi. That structure is long gone, but a series of Hennepin Avenue Bridges have since been built at the site. Both downtowns have extensive networks of enclosed pedestrian bridges known as skyways.

Several well-known Minneapolis buildings helped modernize the city, including the Walker Art Center, Central Public Library, Weisman Art Museum, and Guthrie Theater. Opening in April 2005, the new Walker Art Center, nearly double its former size, includes increased indoor and outdoor facilities.

The Guthrie's new building received significant media coverage it opened in 2006. It was designed by Jean Nouvel and is a 285,000 square feet (26,500 m^{2}) facility that houses three theaters: the theater's signature thrust stage, seating 1,100; a 700-seat proscenium stage; and a black-box studio with flexible seating. In 2002, the National Trust for Historic Preservation put the old Guthrie building on its list of the most endangered historic properties in the U.S. in response to plans the Walker announced to expand on the land the theater occupied. The original Guthrie building was torn down in 2006.

=== Healthcare ===
==== Hospitals with Numbers of Beds ====
Trauma Centers - Level I *; Level II **

Allina Health

- Abbott Northwestern Hospital - Minneapolis - 686
- Mercy Hospital - Coon Rapids - 271 **
- Mercy Hospital (Unity Campus) - Fridley - 164
- Phillips Eye Institute - Minneapolis - 8
- Regina Hospital - Hastings - 43
- St. Francis Regional Medical Center - Shakopee - 89
- United Hospital - St. Paul - 556

Children's Minnesota - 443

- Children's Minnesota Hospital - Minneapolis *
- Children's Minnesota Hospital - St. Paul *

Gillette Children's Specialty Healthcare

- Gillette Children's Hospital - St. Paul - 60

HealthPartners Park Nicollet

- Lakeview Hospital - Stillwater - 90
- Methodist Hospital - St. Louis Park - 361
- Regions Hospital - St. Paul - 552 *
- St. Francis Regional Medical Center - Shakopee - 89

Hennepin Healthcare

- Hennepin County Medical Center - Minneapolis - 484 *

M Health Fairview

- M Health Fairview Lakes Medical Center - Wyoming - 61
- M Health Fairview Ridges Hospital - Burnsville - 171
- M Health Fairview Southdale Hospital - Edina - 334
- M Health Fairview University of Minnesota Medical Center - Minneapolis - 828 **
- M Health Fairview University of Minnesota Masonic Children's Hospital - Minneapolis - 212
- St. John's Hospital - Maplewood - 184
- M Health Fairview Woodwinds Hospital - Woodbury - 86

North Memorial Health

- Maple Grove Hospital - Maple Grove - 130
- North Memorial Health Hospital - Robbinsdale - 353 *

Ridgeview Health

- Ridgeview Medical Center - Waconia - 124

Veterans Administration Health Care

- Veterans Administration Medical Center - Minneapolis - 845

=== Transportation ===
==== Roads and highways ====
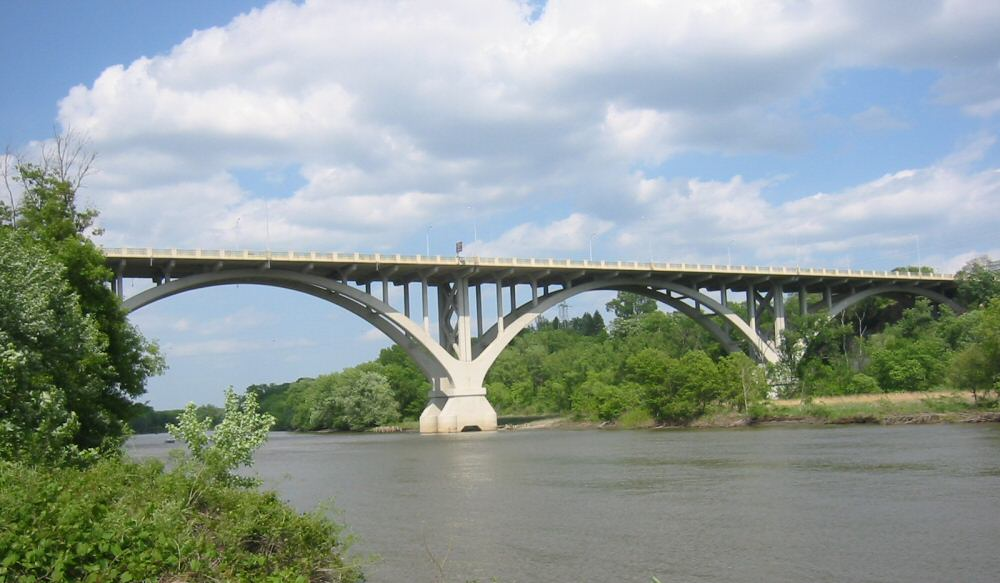
The Mendota Bridge over the Minnesota River between Fort Snelling and Mendota

In the 20th century, the Twin Cities area expanded outward significantly. Automobiles made it possible for suburbs to grow greatly. The area now has a number of freeways, and many traffic cameras and ramp meters to monitor and manage traffic congestion. There is some use of HOV (high-occupancy vehicle) express lanes, which is becoming more common. To use an express lane, a driver must have a MnPASS transponder or at least one passenger. MnPASS rates are determined by the amount of traffic on the road and/or the time of day. During non-peak times, the MnPASS express lanes, except those on Interstate 394 (I-394) between Minnesota Highway 100 (MN 100) and I-94, are open to all traffic.

I-94 comes into the area from the east and heads northwest from Minneapolis. Two spur routes form the I-494/I-694 loop, and I-394 continues west when I-94 turns north. I-35 splits in Burnsville in the southern part of the region, bringing I-35E into Saint Paul and I-35W into Minneapolis. They rejoin to the north in Columbus, just south of Forest Lake, and continue to the highway's terminus in Duluth. This is one of only two examples of an interstate highway splitting into branches and then rejoining; the other is in Dallas–Fort Worth, where I-35 also splits into east and west branches.

On August 1, 2007, much of the I-35W Mississippi River bridge near downtown Minneapolis collapsed into the Mississippi River around 6:05pm CDT. A replacement bridge opened on September 18, 2008.

Interstates

- I-35
- I-35E
- I-35W
- I-94
- I-394
- I-494
- I-694

U.S. Highways

- US 10
- US 12
- US 52 (Lafayette Freeway)
- US 61 (Blues Highway)
- US 169 (Johnson Memorial Highway)
- US 212 (Minnesota Veterans Memorial Highway)

Major state highways

- MN 3
- MN 5
- MN 7
- MN 13
- MN 36
- MN 47
- MN 51 (Snelling Avenue North)
- MN 55 (Olson Memorial Highway)
- MN 62 (Crosstown Highway)
- MN 65
- MN 77 (Cedar Avenue)
- MN 100
- MN 101
- MN 120
- MN 149
- MN 252
- MN 156
- MN 280
- MN 610

==== Air travel ====
The main airport in the region is Minneapolis–Saint Paul International Airport (MSP), a major hub for Delta Air Lines. Endeavor Air, a Delta subsidiary, is based there. MSP is also Sun Country Airlines' main hub and operating base. There are six smaller (relief) airports in the area owned and operated by the Metropolitan Airports Commission (the same agency operates MSP). Some people commute by air to the Twin Cities from northern Minnesota.

Relief airports in the metropolitan area are:

- Airlake Airport (LVN) – Lakeville
- Anoka County-Blaine Airport (ANE) – Blaine
- Crystal Airport (MIC) – Crystal
- Flying Cloud Airport (FCM) – Eden Prairie
- Lake Elmo Airport (21D) – Lake Elmo
- St. Paul Downtown Airport (STP) – St. Paul

==== Public transit ====
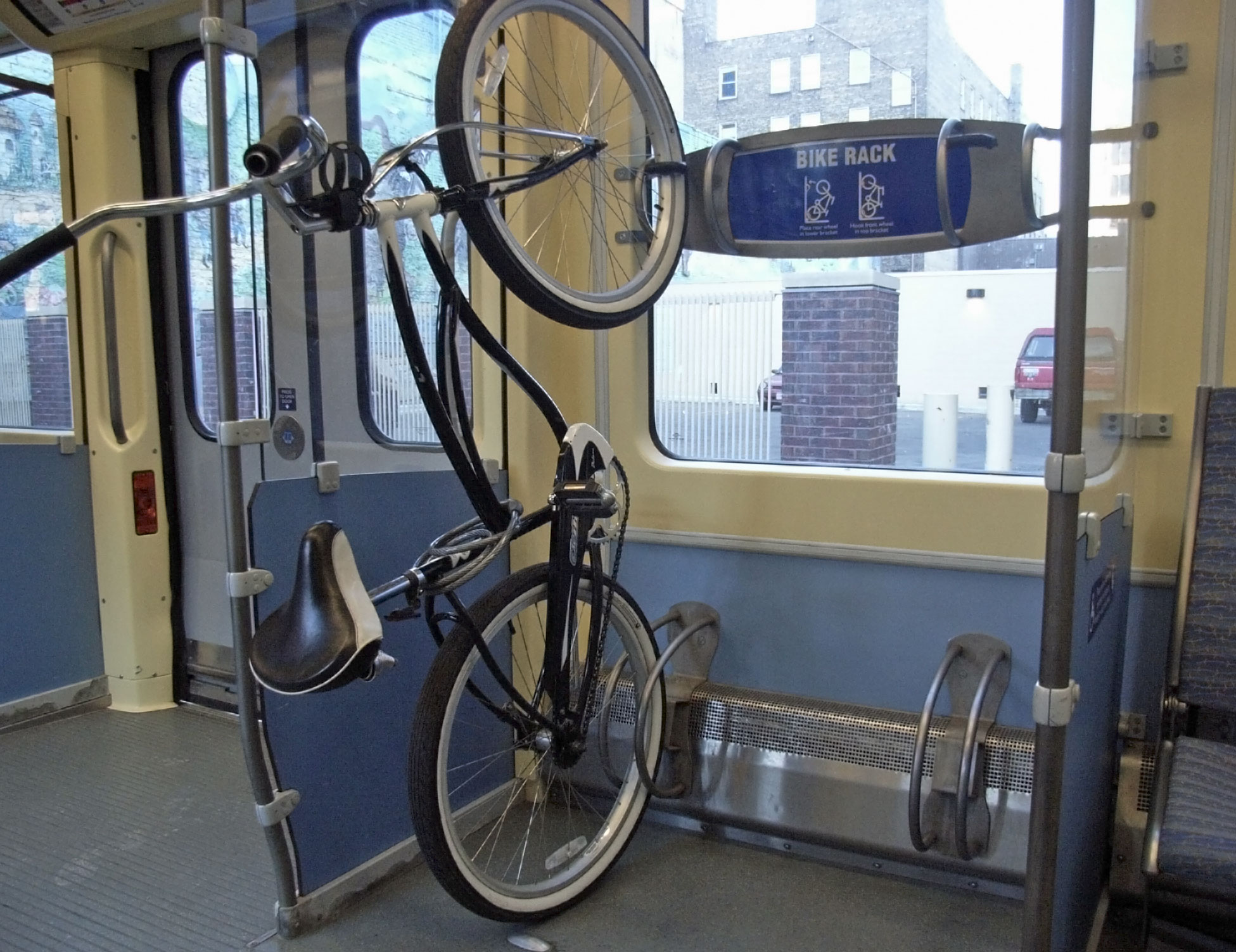
A bicycle rack on the METRO Blue Line LRT

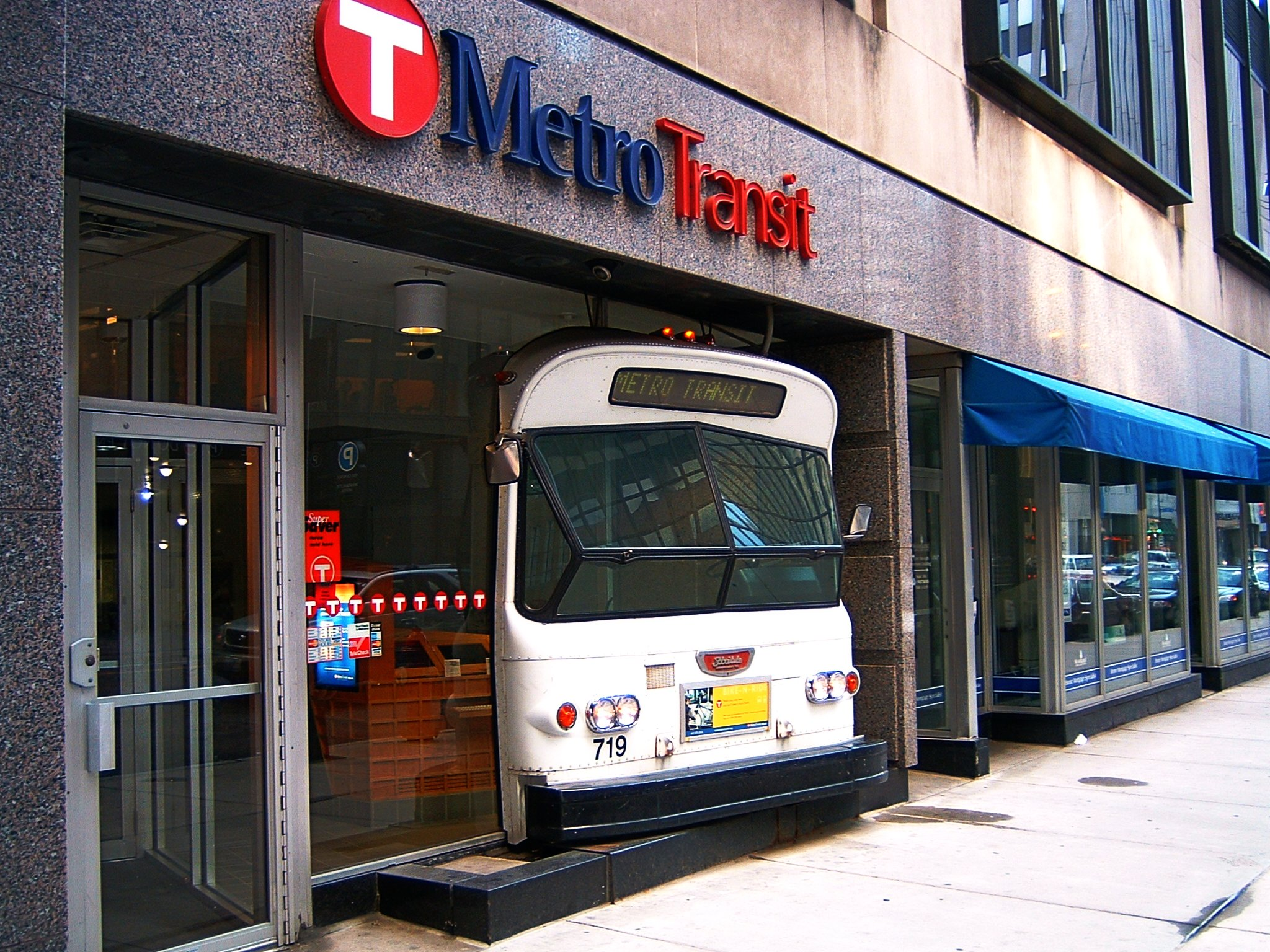
A Metro Transit storefront, Minneapolis

Metro Transit, by far the area's biggest bus service provider, owes its existence to the old streetcar lines in the area. Metro Transit provides about 95% of the public transit rides in the region, with over 900 buses, while some suburbs have other bus services. The University of Minnesota, Twin Cities operates a free bus system between its campuses. This system includes the Campus Connector bus rapid transit line, which travels between the Minneapolis and Saint Paul campuses by a dedicated bus line and throughout the two campuses on normal access roads.

The METRO Blue Line LRT (light rail) began operations in 2004, connecting downtown Minneapolis, Minneapolis–Saint Paul International Airport, and the Mall of America in Bloomington. It was followed by the METRO Red Line BRT (bus rapid transitway) in 2013, connecting the Mall of America with Lakeville along Cedar Avenue through the southern suburbs. The METRO Green Line LRT connecting downtown Minneapolis, the University of Minnesota campus, and downtown Saint Paul along University Avenue opened in 2014. Metro Transit operates all three lines.

The METRO system comprises nine separate projects. There are two light rail lines: the Blue Line, which runs from Target Field in downtown Minneapolis past Minneapolis-St Paul International Airport to the Mall of America; and the Green Line, which runs from Target Field past the University of Minnesota to Union Depot in downtown Saint Paul. The BRT Red Line serves as an extension of the Blue Line across the Minnesota River, where it connects with southern suburbs at four different stations.

The BRT Orange Line connects downtown Minneapolis with Burnsville along I-35W. Downtown Saint Paul and Woodbury are connected by the BRT Gold Line via a dedicated busway parallel to I-94 for much of its route. The arterial BRT A, B, and C lines serve as upgrades to existing local bus routes and connect with the Blue and Green lines at certain shared stations.

METRO

- Blue Line LRT: Target Field Station – Minneapolis-St. Paul International Airport – Mall of America
- Green Line LRT: Target Field Station – University of Minnesota – Union Depot
- Orange Line BRT: Downtown Minneapolis – Burnsville Heart of the City
- Red Line BRT: Mall of America – Apple Valley Transit Station
- Gold Line BRT: Downtown Saint Paul – Woodbury
- A Line BRT: 46th Street station – Rosedale Transit Center
- B Line BRT: Lake & France Station – Union Depot Station
- C Line BRT: Downtown Minneapolis – Brooklyn Center Transit Center
- D Line BRT: Mall of America – Brooklyn Center Transit Center

A variety of rail services are being pondered by state and local governments, including neighborhood streetcar systems, intercity light rail service, and commuter rail options to exurban regions. Minnesota is one of several Midwestern states considering high-speed rail service, using Chicago as a regional hub.

The Minneapolis–Saint Paul area has been criticized for inadequate public transportation. Its public transportation system is less robust than those of many other cities its size. As the metro area has grown, the roads and highways have been updated and widened, but traffic volume is growing faster than the projects needed to widen them, and public transportation has not expanded commensurate with the population. Minneapolis–Saint Paul is ranked the fifth-worst for congestion growth of similar-sized U.S. metro areas.

Additional lines and spurs are needed to upgrade public transportation in the Twin Cities. Construction of a Green Line extension connecting downtown Minneapolis to the southwest suburb of Eden Prairie is underway. A Blue Line extension along Bottineau Boulevard is being planned from downtown Minneapolis to Brooklyn Park. The METRO Orange Line BRT will eventually be extended to Lakeville.
