= Stroucken =

Stroucken is a surname. Notable people with the surname include:

- Albert P.L. Stroucken (born 1947), Dutch businessman
- Jacques Stroucken (1884–1975), Dutch painter
