= Demographics of Minneapolis =

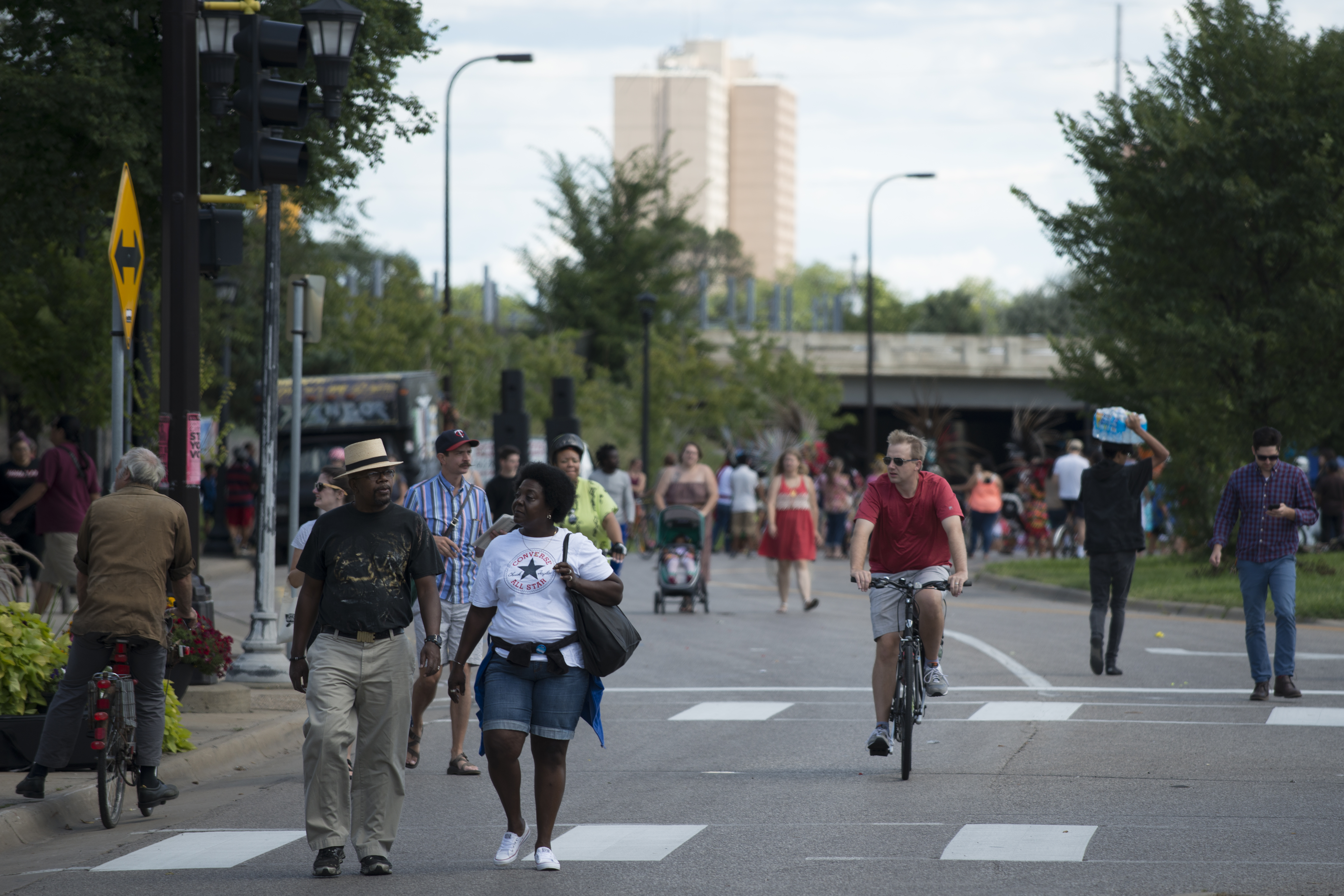
People walking and biking on Franklin Avenue in 2016.

The demographics of Minneapolis are tracked by the United States Census Bureau, with additional data gathered by the Minnesota State Demographic Center and the City of Minneapolis itself. Minneapolis is the largest city in the U.S. state of Minnesota and the county seat of Hennepin County.

As of the 2020 United States Census, the city's population was estimated to be 429,606. The racial composition of the city is predominantly non-Hispanic White, making up approximately 58.1% of the population, followed by African Americans at 18.9%, and Asian at 5.8%. Hispanic or Latinos of any race constitute around 10% of the city's inhabitants.

Minneapolis has a growing immigrant population that includes communities of Somali, Hmong, and Latino immigrants, among others. The 2021 ACS 5-Year estimates 14.8% of Minneapolis residents were not born in the United States.

The age distribution within the city is relatively balanced, with a median age of 31.7 years. Economic factors also play a significant role in the demographic landscape, with a median household income of $58,993 as of 2020, and a poverty rate of 20.7%.

Educational attainment in Minneapolis is higher than the national average, with 87.9% of adults 25 years and older holding a high school degree, and nearly half have a bachelor's degree or higher.

== Population and age ==
Historical population
Census	Pop.	Note	%±
1860	5,809		—
1870	13,066		124.9%
1880	46,887		258.8%
1890	164,738		251.4%
1900	202,718		23.1%
1910	301,408		48.7%
1920	380,582		26.3%
1930	464,356		22.0%
1940	492,370		6.0%
1950	521,718		6.0%
1960	482,872		−7.4%
1970	434,400		−10.0%
1980	370,951		−14.6%
1990	368,383		−0.7%
2000	382,618		3.9%
2010	382,578		0.0%
2020	429,954		12.4%
2021 (est.)	425,336		−1.1%
U.S. Decennial Census; 2020 Census

=== Early years to mid-20th century ===
In its infancy, Minneapolis experienced rapid population growth due to industrialization, immigration, and the city's strategic location near the Mississippi River. This early exponential growth saw a moderate stabilization during the first half of the 20th century. Despite facing significant challenges such as the Great Depression, Minneapolis exhibited resilience, with its population growing to 464,356 by 1930 — an increase of 22.0%.

=== Post-war period ===
The years following World War II presented a new set of challenges for the city. Population growth peaked at 521,718, after which Minneapolis experienced a gradual decline. The exodus to suburban areas was in part due to factors like "white flight," urban decay, and increased automobile ownership. By 1980, the city had lost a considerable number of residents, with the population dipping to 370,951.

=== Late 20th century to present ===
The narrative changed in the latter years of the 20th century and into the 21st century as Minneapolis began to regain its population. Initiatives to rejuvenate downtown areas, improved public transportation, and an influx of younger professionals and immigrants contributed to this renewal. Although the population remained fairly stable from 2000 to 2010, it experienced a significant increase of 12.4% by 2020, reaching 429,954 residents. Downtown Minneapolis has also seen a resurgence, thanks in part to increased housing production, boasting over 60,000 inhabitants.

=== Metropolitan area dynamics ===
The Minneapolis–Saint Paul metropolitan area also witnessed notable transformations. While the metropolitan area doubled in population since 1950, the proportion of metropolitan area residents in Minneapolis and its twin city, St. Paul, dwindled from 70% in 1950 to just 20% by 2010. Suburban expansion was a crucial factor in this demographic shift.

=== Recent age demographics ===
According to the 2021 ACS 5-Year estimates, the population of Minneapolis has a diverse age distribution that suggests an overall aging trend. Specifically, there is a noticeable increase in the 25-34 age bracket compared to the 2010 Census, while younger age groups have slightly diminished.

- 5 to 14 years: 10.9%
- 15 to 44 years: 52.4%
- Under 18 years: 19.7%
- 18 to 24 years: 13.2%
- 60 years and over: 14.9%
- 65 years and over: 10.2%
- 75 years and over: 3.5%

== Race and ethnicity ==
2021 American Community Survey of race and ethnicity in Minneapolis
White	61.1%
Black or African American	16.4%
Hispanic or Latino (of any race)	9.8%
Asian/Pacific Islander	5.1%
American Indian	0.6%
Other races	0.7%
Two or more races	6.3%

=== Contemporary ===
As of the 2020 Census, the racial composition was 58.1% non-Hispanic White, 18.9% Black or African American, 10.4% Hispanic or Latino, 5.8% Asian or Native Hawaiian/Pacific Islander, 1.2% American Indian, and 0.5% some other race. 5.24% were of two or more races.

The city's younger population has an estimated composition of 35% being non-Hispanic White, 32% Black, 17% Hispanic, 5% Asian, 2% Native American, 12% multiracial, and 9% of some other race.

=== Historical ===
Minneapolis was overwhelmingly white for much of its history, with a composition around 99.0% white until approximately 1950.

Black residents began settling in Minneapolis as early as the late 19th century, particularly after the American Civil War, when northern cities were considered safer from the racial politics of the South. Over time, many were concentrated in public housing, a trend that was later challenged and dispersed through lawsuits in the 1990s. After the 1960s when much of the white flight occurred, the black population largely settled on the north side of Minneapolis.

The Asian population in Minneapolis, although historically small, has grown in recent years to about 17,700 individuals. Originally consisting mainly of southern Chinese labor workers in the late 19th century, the city has since welcomed immigrants from Hong Kong, Taiwan, Japan, and Korea. The latter half of the 20th century saw an influx of Southeast Asians, particularly following the Vietnam War.

Since then, the city has undergone significant diversification. Immigrants from countries such as Mexico, Somalia, Ethiopia, Vietnam, Laos, and Cambodia have contributed to this diversity. Minneapolis is home to one of the largest Somali communities in North America, with approximately one-third of the 85,700 people with Somali ancestry in the U.S. residing in Minnesota as of 2010. There has also been a noticeable increase in the Mexican population, particularly in the South and Northeast regions of Minneapolis.

Historical racial and ethnic demographics since 1860
Year	White	Black	Asian (incl. Pacific Is.)	Native	Other race	Two or more	Hispanic or Latino	Non-Hispanic White
1860	99.6%	0.3%						
1870	99.2%	0.8%						
1880	99.2%	0.8%						
1890	99.2%	0.8%						
1900	99.2%	0.8%						
1910	99.1%	0.9%						
1920	98.9%	1.0%	0.1%					
1930	99.0%	0.9%	0.1%					
1940	98.9%	0.9%	0.1%					
1950	98.4%	1.3%	0.2%	0.1%				
1960	96.8%	2.4%	0.3%	0.4%	0.1%			
1970	93.6%	4.4%	0.4%	1.3%	0.3%		0.9%	92.8%
1980	87.3%	7.7%	1.1%	2.4%	1.5%		1.3%	86.7%
1990	78.4%	13.0%	4.3%	3.3%	0.9%		2.1%	77.5%
2000	65.1%	18.0%	6.1%	2.2%	4.1%	4.4%	7.6%	62.5%
2010	63.8%	18.3%	5.6%	1.7%	0.3%	3.4%	10.5%	60.3%
2020	59.5%	18.9%	5.8%	1.2%	0.5%	5.2%	10.4%	58.0%
2021 (est.)	62.4%	16.6%	5.3%	0.7%	0.5%	10.2%	9.8%	61.1%

== Languages ==
The language landscape of Minneapolis is predominantly English-speaking, with 78.8% of the population using only English at home. Given that 8.4% speak English less than "very well", the city provides services in several other languages, including Spanish (spoken by 7.1%), Somali (3.7%), Hmong (2.2%), and American Sign Language. Other languages spoken by smaller percentages of the population include Oromo, Russian, Amharic, Chinese, and French.

The following table presents data from the 2000 Census, detailing the languages spoken at home in Minneapolis.

Language	Speakers	%
English	288,930	80.94
Spanish	25,580	7.17
Hmong	9,665	2.71
Cushite	7,525	2.11
French	2,585	0.72
Vietnamese	2,465	0.69
German	1,675	0.47
Arabic	1,579	0.44
Laotian	1,504	0.42
Amharic	1,485	0.42
Chinese	1,220	0.34
Russian	975	0.27
Japanese	713	0.20
Korean	659	0.18
Norwegian	594	0.17
Italian	574	0.16
Swedish	540	0.15
Polish	520	0.15
Mon-Khmer	480	0.13
Tagalog	445	0.12
Hindi	425	0.12
Swahili	425	0.12
Kru, Ibo, Yoruba	405	0.11
Ukrainian	394	0.11
Ojibwa	379	0.11
Serbo-Croatian	354	0.10
Tibetan	309	0.09
Mande	285	0.08
Lettish	245	0.07
Greek	240	0.07
Persian	240	0.07
Urdu	235	0.07
Finnish	225	0.06
Mandarin	225	0.06
Portuguese	215	0.06
Dakota	204	0.06
Telugu	185	0.05
Thai	160	0.04
Bengali	140	0.04
Hebrew	124	0.03
Turkish	119	0.03
Fulani	105	0.03
Dutch	100	0.03
Czech	95	0.03
Cantonese	90	0.03
Croatian	85	0.02
Gujarathi	85	0.02
Tamil	85	0.02
French Creole	80	0.02
Romanian	80	0.02
Bantu	75	0.02
Danish	70	0.02
Nepali	70	0.02
Bulgarian	65	0.02
Indonesian	65	0.02
Irish Gaelic	65	0.02
Nilotic	55	0.02
Other Indian	50	0.01
Serbian	50	0.01
Hungarian	49	0.01
Efik	45	0.01
Yiddish	40	0.01
Malayalam	39	0.01
Formosan	35	0.01
Marathi	30	0.01
Pashto	30	0.01
Afrikaans	25	0.01
Hocąk	25	0.01
Lithuanian	20	0.01
Total	356,954	100

== Households and families ==
According to the 2005-2007 American Community Survey, there were a total of 155,155 households, out of which 45.3% were family households and 54.7% were non-family households. Of the family households, 21.9% had children under the age of 18 living in them while 29.1% were married couples. In addition, 4.8% of family households were made up of a male householder with no wife present and 11.4% were made up of a female householder with no husband present. Non-family households were 54.7% of all households. Of the non-family households, 42.7% were made up of a householder living alone and 7.4% were made up of a householder living alone who was 65 years of age and over. The average household size was 2.22 and the average family size was 3.11.

== Income, employment and disparity ==
After the recent boom of the 1990s, Minneapolis still lags behind its suburban counterparts in terms of income and employment. Job growth was double in suburban areas and with it, the labor force is growing faster outside the city. Though city wages are exceeding regional jobs, most of the increases are in the downtown area and in corporate industries where employees may not necessarily live inside the city. When downtown is excluded from the statistics, Minneapolis' neighborhood wages are 92.0% of their suburban counterparts. Neighborhoods have gained 5,300 jobs since 1996 but the industry makeup has changed with stable manufacturing and trade jobs losing the most in favor of education, health and service jobs.

The share of adults in the labor force was 70.0% and the recorded low unemployment rate was 4.7% in 2002. However, racial and ethnic minorities lag behind White counterparts with 15.0% of African Americans and 13.0% of Hispanics holding bachelor's degrees, compared to 42.0% of European Americans. About 15.8% of families and 21.5% of the population were below the poverty line, including 33.1% of those under age 18 and 12.4% of those aged 65 or over.

Regionally, the population is continuing to decentralize away from Minneapolis, relocating families and middle to upper income brackets outside the city. Growth in the middle class has been slow with the 2000 median household income at $37,974 and the median family income at $48,602. However, the median household income now stands at $44,478 and the median family income now stands at $59,816.

== Religion ==
According to a 2014 study by the Pew Research Center, 70% of the population of the Minneapolis metro area identified themselves as Christians, with 46% professing attendance at a variety of churches that could be considered Protestant, and 21% professing Roman Catholic beliefs. while 23% claim no religious affiliation. The same study says that other religions (including Judaism, Buddhism, Islam, and Hinduism) collectively make up about 5% of the population.

Religious affiliation in the Minneapolis metro area by movement (2014)
Affiliation	% of population
Christian	70
Protestant	46
Lutheran	23
Historically Black Protestant	4
Methodist	3
Other Protestant	16
Roman Catholic	21
Mormon	1
Eastern Orthodox	1
Other Christian	1
Other religion or association	5
Unaffiliated	23
Nothing in particular	16
Agnostic	4
Atheist	3

31% of residents attend religious service at least once a week, 33% attend at least a few times a year, and 36% do only seldom or never at all. 42% pray at least daily. 69% believe in Heaven, and 51% believe in Hell.
