= Wabasha Street Caves =

Event hall & caves in Minnesota, United States

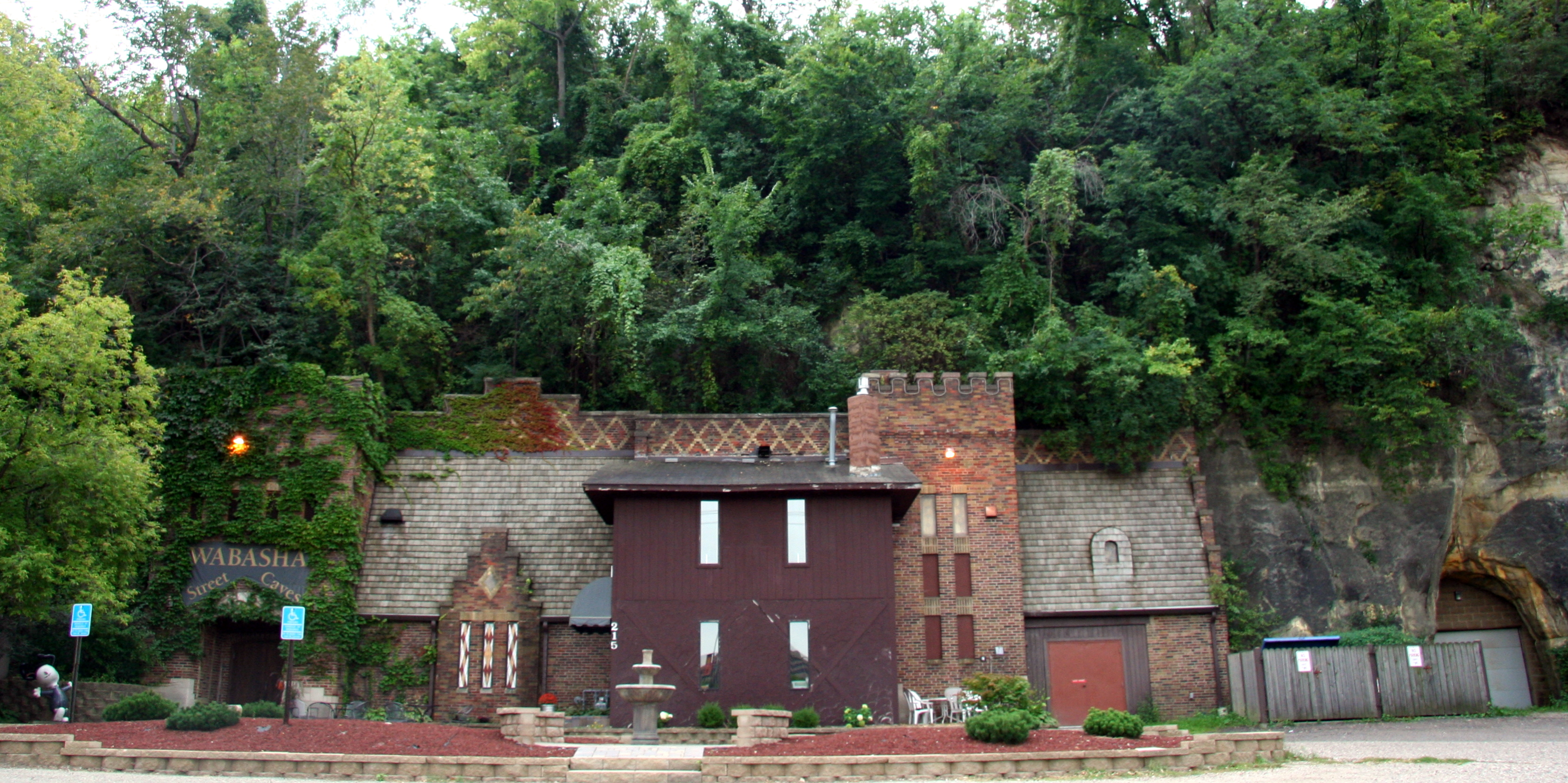
- Interactive map of Wabasha Street Caves
- Location: St. Paul, Minnesota
- Coordinates: 44°56′08.67″N 93°05′12.89″W
- Access: Commercial

The Wabasha Street Caves are a series of manmade caves dug into St Peter sandstone cliffs on the south side (west bank) of the Mississippi River in Saint Paul, Minnesota. The caves are in the city's West Side neighborhood, just across the river from Downtown Saint Paul. The caves have been used for storage, growing mushrooms, as a mobster hideout, as speakeasies, and as an entertainment and tourist venue. For the past 30 years, they have hosted Swing Night every Thursday night with professional live Big Bands and vocalists, playing music of the old Tommy Dorsey, Glenn Miller, Count Basie, Duke Ellington Big Bands. Dances are open to the public and draw crowds in the hundreds. The Wabasha Street Caves also provide historical tours and Murder Mystery Tours.

== History ==
The caves, which technically are mines because they are manmade, are carved out of sandstone and date back to the 1840s. Throughout history the caves have been used for a number of different activities, including growing mushrooms, storage of food and belongings, music, and dancing.

In the 1920s, the caves were used as a restaurant and nightclub venue known as the Wabasha Street Speakeasy. The speakeasy was said to have been frequented by gangsters such as John Dillinger and Ma Barker, however there is no evidence that these visits occurred; thus, these stories are considered legend.

On October 26, 1933, Josie & William Lehmann opened the Castle Royal, which was built into the side of the caves. Castle Royal was closed in the late 1930s due to the start of World War II and went back to primarily being a place to grow mushrooms. Some time in the 1970s, Castle Royal 2 was opened as a venue for Disco music. The caves have also been used as a place of storage for debris and belongings that were washed up from flooding. Some of these things can still be found in the caves today.

The caves extend beyond the areas used by the modern Wabasha Street Caves venue. Multiple people have died in the caves in the past due to suspected carbon monoxide poisoning caused by fires lit within the caves, including two teenagers in 1992 and three teenagers in 2004. At least three other people have died in the caves since 1988 due to drowning, a fire, and a cave collapse. The city of Saint Paul has attempted to block entrances to the cave complex and posted warnings at known entrances advising people of the dangers.
