= Albert P.L. Stroucken =

Dutch businessman (born 1947)

- Born: July 9, 1947 (age 78); Nieuwenhagen, Netherlands
- Occupation: Businessman

Albert P. L. Stroucken (born July 9, 1947) is a Dutch businessman. He is the former president, chief executive and chairman of H.B. Fuller and Owens-Illinois.

== Early life ==
Albert P.L. Stroucken was born on July 9, 1947, in Nieuwenhagen, Netherlands. He earned a PhD. He is fluent in English, Dutch, German and French.

== Career ==
Stroucken was the executive vice president and president of industrial chemicals division of Bayer AG from 1992 to 1997, and the general manager of its inorganics division from 1997 to 1998. He was the chairman of the H.B. Fuller Company from 1999 to 2006, and its president and chief executive officer from 1998 to 2006. He was the president, chairman of the board, and chief executive officer of Owens-Illinois from 2006 to 2015. While CEO of Owens Illinois in 2008, Stroucken earned a total compensation of $5,768,438, which included a base salary of $1,011,500, a cash bonus of $559,913, stocks granted of $2,799,990, and options granted of $1,199,999.

Stroucken has served on the board of directors of Baxter International Inc. since 2004, and Shire since 2016.
