= Jacques Stroucken =

Dutch painter

- Born: Jacques Stroucken; 1 December 1884; The Netherlands
- Died: 8 May 1975 (aged 90) n/a
- Occupation: Painter

Jacques Stroucken (1 December 1884 - 8 July 1975) was a Dutch painter.
