= H.B. Fuller =

American adhesives manufacturer

H.B. Fuller Company
- Type: Public
- Traded as: NYSE: FUL; S&P 600 component
- Industry: Adhesives; coatings; sealants
- Founded: 1887; 139 years ago in St. Paul, Minnesota, U.S.
- Founder: Harvey Benjamin Fuller
- Headquarters: St. Paul, Minnesota, U.S.
- Number of locations: 77 (2025)
- Area served: Worldwide
- Key people: Celeste B. Mastin (President and CEO); John J. Corkrean (CFO)
- Revenue: ▼US$3.47 billion (2025)
- Operating income: ▲US$355 million (2025)
- Net income: ▲US$152 million (2025)
- Total assets: ▲US$5.18 billion (2025)
- Total equity: ▲US$2.00 billion (2025)
- Number of employees: 7,100 (2025)
- Divisions: Hygiene, Health and Consumable Adhesives; Engineering Adhesives; Construction Adhesives
- Website: hbfuller.com
- Footnotes; Financials as of November 29, 2025.

H.B. Fuller Company is an American multinational adhesives manufacturing company headquartered in St. Paul, Minnesota. H.B. Fuller manufactures more than 20,000 products for a variety of applications, including those used in construction, engineering, electronics, hygiene products, and food packaging. Its products are made at 81 manufacturing facilities in 26 countries. As of 2024, it was the fourth-largest manufacturer of adhesives and sealants in the world, employed approximately 7,500 people, and had revenues of US$3.57 billion. Celeste Mastin is the company's chief executive officer. In 2024, the company ranked No. 781 on the Fortune 1000.

H.B. Fuller was founded in 1887 by Harvey Benjamin Fuller. It began as a one-man operation in St. Paul, Minnesota, becoming a supplier of adhesives with business throughout the United States by the 1890s. It was run by the Fuller family until 1941, when Elmer L. Andersen purchased a majority stake in the company and assumed leadership. Andersen expanded the company internationally and took it public in 1968. It became a member of the Fortune 500 in the 1980s. In the 1990s, reports surfaced that children in Latin America were inhaling vapors from H.B. Fuller solvent-based adhesives used in the manufacture of footwear. In response, H.B. Fuller changed its formulation and ceased sale of the adhesive to the general public. The company reorganized in the early 2000s to become a specialty chemical firm. It acquired companies and built plants in China and India in the 2010s.

== History ==
H.B. Fuller was founded in 1887 by Harvey Benjamin Fuller in St. Paul, Minnesota, as a one-person company making glue for wallpaper. By the 1890s, Fuller's inventions included wall cleaners and the company had business throughout the United States. It incorporated in 1915, and in 1921, Harvey Jr. took over as president.

In 1941, Elmer L. Andersen, purchased the company from the Fuller family. Sales at the time of Andersen's purchase totaled US$200,000 annually; by 1959, sales had increased to US$10 million annually. H.B. Fuller expanded its position in the consumer goods market in 1956 with the construction of a plant in Minneapolis to make packing tape. By 1962, H.B. Fuller was one of the three largest adhesives manufacturers in the United States and had 20 manufacturing facilities in the U.S., South America, and Canada. H.B. Fuller acquired the Costa Rican company Kativo Chemical Industries in 1967, expanding its portfolio to include paints and inks. The company went public and made its initial public offering in 1968.

Andersen's son, Anthony, became company president in 1971. Under his leadership, H.B. Fuller sales increased from US$60 million in 1971 to approximately US$800 million in 1991. In 1976, H.B. Fuller and 22 other companies joined together to form the Minnesota Keystone Program, a group of corporations that agreed to donate a portion of their pre-tax profits to charity. The company became a member of the Fortune 500 in 1983 and was recognized by Robert Levering and Milton Moskowitz as one of the "100 Best Places to Work in America". By 1995, the company sold its products globally and had more than 10,000 adhesives in its catalog. That year, the company expanded into powder coating with the construction of a new facility in Oakdale, Minnesota.

Albert P.L. Stroucken became chief executive officer (CEO) in 1998. He began a widespread downsizing and reorganization of the company, closing 26 manufacturing facilities and cutting approximately 2,500 jobs by 2003 in an effort to reduce costs and position the company as a specialty chemical firm. Under Stroucken's leadership, H.B. Fuller sold its powder coating division to Valspar and purchased Roanoke Companies Group for US$270 million.

Jim Owens became CEO of H.B. Fuller in 2010. Under Owens, H.B. Fuller made more than a dozen acquisitions, including Royal Adhesives & Sealants for US$1.6 billion. The acquisition of Royal was the largest in company history and made H.B. Fuller the largest manufacturer of adhesives for commercial roofing and insulated glass in the world. The company also constructed manufacturing facilities in Nanjing, China and Shirwal, India, in 2011. Owens was succeeded as CEO by Celeste Mastin in 2022.

=== Use of products as an inhalant ===
In the 1990s, reports were published about the popular use of adhesives as an inhalant among poor children in Central America, though the company had been aware of the issue for years prior. H.B. Fuller adhesives were common among those abused and the company reportedly declined to add a noxious oil to the glue to discourage its use as an inhalant, citing exposure concerns for legitimate users of the product and saying that adding the toxin would not address the deeper social issues that led to abuse. The company ended the retail sale of Resistol, a commonly abused brand, in the region in 1992. It continued to sell the product for commercial and industrial applications, which drew criticism from advocacy groups who favored a total cessation of the sale of Resistol. The company changed the formula of Resistol in 1994, swapping the compound toluene for a less dangerous and addictive substance, cyclohexane. In 1995, the company was sued for the wrongful death of Joel Linares, a 16-year-old Guatemalan boy who allegedly died from side effects of inhaling Resistol. The lawsuit was dismissed in 1996 by a judge in Minnesota due to a lack of jurisdiction. The company stopped selling solvent-based adhesives over the counter in Latin America in November 1999 and said that by August 2000 any remaining supplies should have been used.

=== Acquisition of Advanced Medical Solutions Group ===
H.B. Fuller has acquired four businesses from the United Kingdom since 2022. In April 2026, H.B. Fuller made an offer to acquire U.K.-based Advanced Medical Solutions Group (AMS). The company believes the acquisition of AMS would increase its total addressable market by $15 to $95 billion. H.B. Fuller publicly announced the offer in a press release issued on June 25. The morning after the announcement was made to purchase AMS, H.B. Fuller's stock fell by 8%.

On June 25th, Crane's Cleveland Business reported that the proposed acquisition would go for $870 million U.S. Investment group Ancora Holdings owns 2% of H.B. Fuller. On May 26, Ancora released a letter expressing its opposition to the acquisition. In the letter Ancora complained about the "competence, candor, and strategic judgment" of the management and board of directors. Ancora stated it believes the acquisition is "reckless". Additionally, Ancora stated that the potential acquisition of AMS would increase H.B. Fuller's debt. Ancora also believes that the acquisition would distract a management team that it feels is underwhelming and that the transaction would lead to a decline in value.

On June 25, Ancora's leaders (Chairman and CEO Fredrick D. DiSanto and Ancora Alternatives president James Chadwick) wrote, "We believe H.B. Fuller's Board and management have exposed themselves as disingenuous at best and deceitful at worst throughout their pursuit of AMS." Ancora criticized the timing of the press release about the acquisition, which was at 2 a.m. on June 25, quoting H.B. Fuller's CEO Celeste Martin's own words, "Acting with integrity and doing the right thing in all our business practices is fundamental to H.B. Fuller's philosophy of winning the right way."

According to Ancora, the acquisition was supported by all three of the directors who are slated to stand for election next year: Ruth S. Kimmelshue, Thomas W. Handley and Srilata A. Zaheer. Ancora first threatened a proxy fight in May. "You are welcome to draw us into a fight, but it is hard to remember the last time that worked out well for a corporate leadership team," Ancora said at the time. "We are prepared to hold leadership accountable for any value-destructive and ill-timed capital allocation blunders via a proxy fight next year." Instead of buying AMS, Ancora wants H.B. Fuller to instead conduct a strategic review about selling parts or all of the company to another.

== Company overview ==
H.B. Fuller manufactures adhesives for a variety of applications, including those used in construction, engineering, electronics, hygiene products, and food packaging. The company has 81 manufacturing facilities in 26 countries and manufactures more than 20,000 different products. H.B. Fuller employs approximately 7,500 people, is headquartered in St. Paul, Minnesota, and is led by chief executive officer Celeste Mastin. In 2024, it had net revenue of US$3.57 billion.

=== Recognition ===
In the 1980s, H.B. Fuller was recognized as a "socially responsible" investment for the company's efforts to properly dispose of industrial waste, conserve energy, and for donating property near its headquarters to create a nature reserve. In 1996, Business Ethics named H.B. Fuller one of the Top 100 Best Corporate Citizens.

In the 2020s, the company was recognized for having a high percentage of women in leadership positions by the New York chapter of the International Women's Forum and Twin Cities Business. Newsweek has recognized H.B. Fuller as one of "America's Most Responsible Companies" in 2020, a top company for remote work in 2023 and one of "America's Greatest Workplaces for Inclusion & Diversity" in 2025. In 2022 the company won an Adhesives and Sealants Council Innovation Award for "Low Monomer/Emission Reactive Hot Melt Adhesives." In 2023, Forbes named H.B. Fuller one of the "Best Midsize Employers" in the U.S. and the Minnesota Star Tribune named the company one of the top 200 employers in Minnesota.
