= SMART Health Card =

Vaccine passport framework

- Type of project: Immunity passport
- Owner: SMART Health IT (Boston Children's Hospital)
- Founder: Kenneth Mandl, Isaac Kohane
- Country: United States
- Established: 2010
- Website: https://smarthealth.cards/en/

The SMART Health Card framework is an open source immunity passport program designed to store and share medical information in paper or digital form. It was initially launched as a vaccine passport during the COVID-19 pandemic, but is envisioned for use for other infectious diseases. SMART Health Cards include a QR code which can be scanned and verified using the official SMART Health Card Verifier mobile app, supported by Apple and Android. It was rolled out by the Vaccination Credential Initiative (VCI) based on technology developed at Boston Children's Hospital, and standards set by Health Level Seven International (HL7) and the World Wide Web Consortium (W3C). It is recognized by the International Organization for Standardization.

== History ==
=== Founding ===
In February 2009, United States president Barack Obama signed an economic stimulus package which included $19 billion in funds for investment in health information technology. The following month, researchers from Boston Children's Hospital and Harvard Medical School, Kenneth Mandl and Isaac Kohane, published an article in The New England Journal of Medicine calling for the modernization of electronic health records through API integrations on mobile devices. In April 2010, the pair secured a $15 million grant through the Office of the National Coordinator for Health Information Technology's Strategic Health IT Advanced Research Projects (SHARP) program. With this federal funding, the researchers began development of an interoperable healthcare IT platform they called "Substitutable Medical Applications and Reusable Technologies" (SMART). The first iteration of the platform API was previewed later that year, and "SMART Classic" was released in 2011.

In 2013, SMART adopted the open-source Fast Health Interoperability Resources (FHIR) standard developed by Health Level Seven International (HL7). The newly named SMART on FHIR platform was debuted in February 2014 at the Health Information Management Systems Society conference.

=== 21st Century Cures Act ===
According to SMART Health IT, Mandl successfully lobbied for the inclusion of a universal API requirement in the 21st Century Cures Act, signed into law on December 13, 2016. The team also advocated for a federal rule establishing SMART as the universal API. In 2019, the Office of the National Coordinator for Health Information Technology published the "final rule" specifying the SMART framework as the standard to satisfy the requirements of the 21st Century Cures Act; the rule was implemented in June 2020.

=== COVID-19 ===
The SMART Health Card framework was deployed as a "de facto standard" for vaccine passports in the COVID-19 pandemic in the United States and other international jurisdictions. On January 14, 2021, the Mitre Corporation announced the launch of a new public–private partnership called the Vaccination Credential Initiative (VCI) alongside the CARIN Alliance, Cerner, Change Healthcare, The Commons Project Foundation, Epic Systems, Evernorth, Mayo Clinic, Microsoft, Oracle, Safe Health, and Salesforce. VCI's purpose was to employ the SMART Health Card framework in order to create a unified proof-of-vaccination system for COVID-19 vaccines.

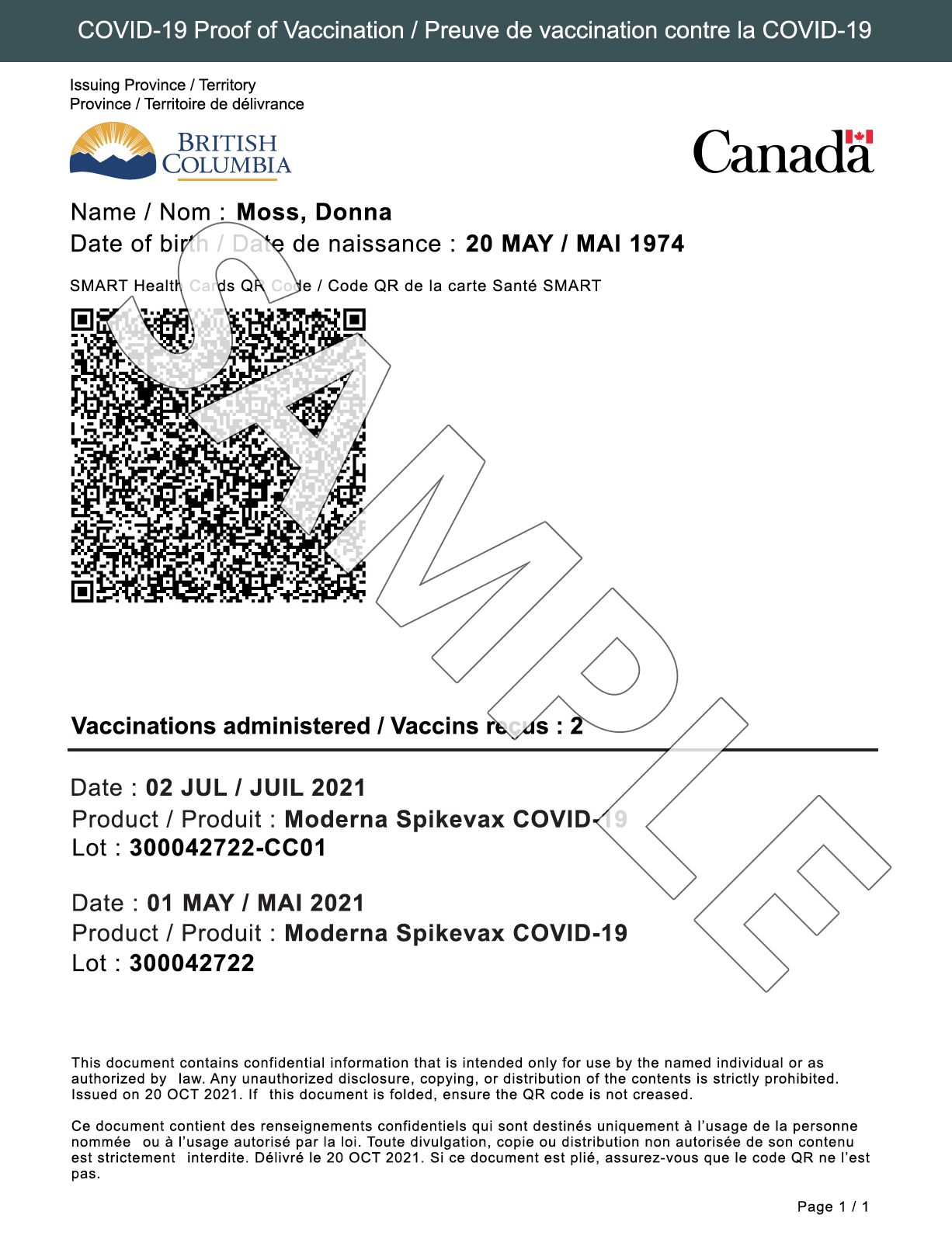
Sample proof of vaccination from British Columbia using SMART Health Card framework

The California Department of Public Health introduced a Digital Covid-19 Vaccine Record portal in June 2021, allowing individuals to verify their vaccination status using the SMART Health Card reader.

On August 5, 2021, New York Governor Andrew Cuomo announced the introduction of the "Excelsior Pass Plus" which would expand its Excelsior Pass program into other states and internationally by connecting it to the SMART Health Card system. As of August 27, 2021, 415,000 citizens of Louisiana had added their COVID-19 vaccination status to their state-run, SMART Health Card enabled LA Wallet. On September 8, 2021, Hawaii governor David Ige announced the rollout of the state's Hawaiʻi SMART Health Card. County-level health departments across the United States partnered with VaccineCheck to issue SMART Health Cards by verifying vaccine cards provided by the Centers for Disease Control and Prevention.

The Government of Canada spent CAD$4.6 million to develop a proof-of-vaccination credential on the SMART Health Card framework, enabling its ArriveCAN travel application to store, recognize and verify credentials from every province, territory and foreign country. Since October 2021, Canadian provinces and territories used the SMART Health Card format as a requirement by the federal government, including British Columbia, Newfoundland and Labrador, the Northwest Territories, Nova Scotia, Nunavut, Ontario, Quebec, Saskatchewan and the Yukon.

On October 13, 2021, the American Immunization Registry Association (AIRA) published a statement encouraging adoption of SMART Health Cards as a common standard "where allowed by local law and policy." "SMARTHealth.Cards" was listed as a supporting member of AIRA through the VCI.

A SMART Health Cards Global Forum was held on October 28, 2021. The event featured keynote speakers Andy Slavitt (former Senior Pandemic Advisor to President Joe Biden’s COVID-19 pandemic response team) and Mike Leavitt (former United States Secretary of Health and Human Services).

On December 20, 2021, Japan's Ministry of Health, Labour and Welfare launched its COVID-19 Vaccination Certificate Application using the SMART Health Card.

By January 2022, about 80% of Americans who had received a COVID-19 vaccine had access to a SMART Health Card through their state governments, local businesses, universities and healthcare systems.

== Participants ==
=== Developers ===
SMART Health IT is based out of the Computational Health Informatics Program (CHIP) at the Boston Children's Hospital. CHIP's related projects include Apache cTAKES, Genomic Information Commons, HealthMap, and VaccineFinder.

The SMART Health Card's project sponsor is HL7 International's Public Health Work Group, consisting of representatives from Allscripts, the Altarum Institute, Tennessee Department of Health and Washington State Department of Health.

=== Issuers ===
Official registries of authorized SMART Health Card issuers are maintained by SMART Health IT, the Vaccination Credential Initiative, and the CommonTrust Network. Authorized issuers include:

- AdventHealth
- Adventist Health
- Advocate Aurora Health
- Akron Children's Hospital
- Alaska Department of Health and Social Services
- Albertsons
- Allegheny Health Network
- Altru Health System
- AnMed Health Medical Center
- Ardent Health Services
- Arizona Department of Health Services
- Arkansas Children's Hospital
- Arkansas Department of Health
- Aspirus Medford Hospital
- Atlantic Health System
- Atrium Health
- Atrius Health
- Aultman Hospital
- Ballad Health
- Banner Health
- Baptist Health South Florida
- Baptist Health System
- Barnabas Health
- Bayhealth Medical Center
- Baylor Scott & White Health
- Beaumont Health
- Bellin Health
- Big Y
- Billings Clinic
- BJC HealthCare
- Blanchard Valley Health System
- Boca Raton Regional Hospital
- Bon Secours Health System
- Boston Children's Hospital
- Boston Medical Center
- Boulder Community Health
- Bronson Healthcare Group
- Brooklyn Hospital Center
- Brookwood Baptist Health
- Broward Health
- Bryan Health
- Cabell Huntington Hospital
- California Department of Public Health (CDPH)
- Cambridge Health Alliance
- CANImmunize
- Care New England
- Carle Foundation Hospital
- Catholic Health
- Cedars-Sinai Medical Center
- CentraCare Health
- Charleston Area Medical Center
- Cheyenne Regional Medical Center
- Children's Hospital & Medical Center
- Children's Hospital Los Angeles
- Children's Mercy Hospital
- Children's National Hospital
- Children's Wisconsin
- ChristianaCare
- Christus Health
- City of Hope National Medical Center
- Clara Barton Hospital
- Cleveland Clinic
- Colorado Department of Public Health and Environment
- Columbus Regional Health
- CommonSpirit Health
- Concord Hospital
- Cone Health
- Conemaugh Health System
- Connecticut Children's Medical Center
- Cook Children's Medical Center
- Cook County Health and Hospital System
- Cooper University Health Care
- Costco
- County of Santa Clara Health System
- Covenant Healthcare
- CoxHealth
- Curative
- CVS Health
- Deaconess Health System
- Detroit Medical Center
- Dignity Health
- Duke University Health System
- East Jefferson General Hospital
- eHealth Saskatchewan
- Einstein Healthcare Network
- El Camino Hospital
- Emory Healthcare
- Englewood Hospital and Medical Center
- Erlanger Health System
- Essentia Health
- Excelsior Pass
- Express Scripts
- Fairview Health Services
- Food City
- Franciscan Alliance
- Froedtert Health
- Garnet Health
- Geisinger Health System
- Genesis Health System
- Government of Alberta
- Government of Manitoba
- Government of Northwest Territories
- Government of Palau
- Government of Prince Edward Island
- Government of Quebec
- Government of Yukon
- Grady Healthcare System
- Greater Baltimore Medical Center
- Group Health Cooperative
- Guam Department of Public Health and Social Services
- Gundersen Health System
- Hackensack Meridian Health
- Hawaii Pacific Health
- Henry Ford Health System
- Holland Hospital
- Hospital for Special Surgery
- Hospital Sisters Health System
- Houston Methodist Hospital
- Hurley Medical Center
- Hy-Vee
- Idaho Department of Health and Welfare
- Illinois Department of Public Health
- Indiana Regional Medical Center
- Indiana University Health
- Inova Health System
- Institute for Family Health
- Jackson Health System
- Jefferson Health
- John Muir Health
- Johns Hopkins School of Medicine
- Kaiser Permanente
- Kaleida Health
- Kelsey-Seybold Clinic
- Kennedy Krieger Institute
- Kentucky Immunization Registry (KYIR)
- Kmart
- Lahey Health
- Lawrence + Memorial Hospital
- LCMC Health System
- Legacy Health
- Lehigh Valley Health Network
- Lexington Medical Center
- LifeBridge Health
- LifePoint Health
- Logansport Memorial Hospital
- Los Angeles County Department of Health Services
- Lowell General Hospital
- Loyola Medicine
- Lutheran Health Network
- Main Line Health
- Marcus Daly Memorial Hospital
- Marshall Islands Immunization Registry
- Mary Washington Healthcare
- Maryland Department of Health Center for Immunization
- Mass General Brigham
- Massachusetts Immunization Information System (MIIS)
- Mayo Clinic
- Medical University of South Carolina
- MediSys Health Network
- MedStar Health
- Meijer
- Memorial Healthcare System
- Memorial Hermann Health System
- Mercy Medical Center
- Mercyhealth
- Methodist Le Bonheur Healthcare
- Michigan Medicine
- Ministry of Health and Welfare (Taiwan)
- Ministry of Health, Labor, and Welfare of Japan
- Mission Health System
- Mississippi State Department of Health
- Moffitt Cancer Center
- Mohawk Valley Health System
- Molina Healthcare
- Monongalia General Hospital
- Montefiore Medical Center
- Mount Auburn Hospital
- Mount Sinai Health System
- Mount Sinai Medical Center
- MultiCare Health System
- MyMichigan Health
- Nationwide Children's Hospital
- Nebraska Medicine
- Nevada Division of Public and Behavioral Health
- New Brunswick Department of Health Innovation
- New Jersey Department of Health
- New Mexico Immunization Program
- New South Wales Department of Customer Service
- New South Wales Ministry of Health
- New York State Department of Health
- Newfoundland and Labrador Health Services
- NewYork-Presbyterian Brooklyn Methodist Hospital
- North Memorial Health Hospital
- NorthShore University HealthSystem
- Northside Hospital System
- Northwest Community Hospital
- Northwestern Medicine
- Norton Healthcare
- Novant Health
- NSW Health Pathology
- NYC Health + Hospitals
- NYU Langone Health System
- Ochsner Health System
- Ohio State University Wexner Medical Center
- OhioHealth
- Ontario Ministry of Health
- Optum
- Oregon Health Authority
- Oregon Health & Science University
- OSF HealthCare
- Owensboro Health
- Pagosa Springs Medical Center
- Parkland Health & Hospital System
- Parkview Health
- PeaceHealth
- Penn Medicine
- Penn State Health System
- Premier Health Partners
- Presbyterian Healthcare Services
- Prisma Health
- ProMedica
- Providence St. Joseph Health
- Public Health Agency of Canada (PHAC)
- Renown Health
- Rhode Island Department of Health
- Rite Aid
- Riverside Health System
- Riverside University Health System Medical Center
- Royal Jubilee Hospital
- Rush University Medical Center
- Rutland Regional Medical Center
- Saint Francis Health System
- Salem Health
- Salinas Valley Memorial Hospital
- Samaritan Health Services
- San Antonio Regional Hospital
- San Francisco Department of Public Health
- San Joaquin General Hospital
- San Juan Regional Medical Center
- Sanford Health
- Sansum Clinic
- SCL Health
- Scripps Health
- Seattle Children's
- Self Regional Healthcare
- Sentara Healthcare
- Silver Cross Hospital
- South Central Regional Medical Center
- South Georgia Medical Center
- Southcoast Health System
- Southwest General Health Center
- Sparrow Health System
- Spartanburg Regional Healthcare System
- Spectrum Health
- Spectrum Health Lakeland
- SSM Health
- St. Charles Health System
- St. Elizabeth Healthcare
- Saint John's Health Center
- St. Joseph's Hospital Health Center
- St. Luke's University Health Network
- Stanford Health Care
- Stormont Vail Health
- Summit Health
- SUNY Upstate
- Sutter Health
- Tampa General Hospital
- Temple Health
- Tenet Healthcare
- Texas Children's Hospital
- Texas Health Resources
- Torrance Memorial Medical Center
- TriHealth
- Trinity Health
- Truman Medical Center
- Tucson Medical Center
- UCHealth
- UConn Health
- UCSF Health
- UF Health
- UK HealthCare
- UMass Memorial Health
- UNC Health Care
- Union General Hospital
- United Health Services
- UnityPoint Health
- University Medical Center of El Paso
- University of Alabama Hospital
- University of California, Los Angeles (UCLA)
- University of Chicago Medical Center
- University of Iowa
- University of Kansas
- University of Louisville
- University of Maryland Medical System
- University of Michigan Health
- University of Mississippi Medical Center
- University of Missouri Health Care
- University of New Mexico
- University of Pittsburgh Medical Center (UPMC)
- University of South Florida
- University of Tennessee Medical Center
- University of Texas Health Science Center at Houston
- University of Texas MD Anderson Cancer Center
- University of Texas Medical Branch
- University of Texas Southwestern Medical Center
- University of Utah Health Care
- University of Vermont Medical Center
- UPMC Central PA
- UT Health San Antonio
- Utah Department of Health
- UW Medicine
- Valley Children's Healthcare
- Valleywise Health
- Vanderbilt University Medical Center
- VCU Health System
- Vidant Health
- Virginia Department of Health
- WakeMed
- Walgreens
- Walmart
- Washington State Department of Health
- WellSpan Health
- Wellstar Health System
- Westchester Medical Center
- Western Connecticut Health Network
- Winona Health
- WVU Medicine
- Wyoming Medical Center
- Yale New Haven Health System
- Yale University
- Yavapai Regional Medical Center
- Yuma Regional Medical Center

== See also ==
- COVID-19 apps
- COVID-19 vaccine
- Digital identity
- Electronic health record
- Immunity passport
- Vaccine passports during the COVID-19 pandemic
