= List of hospitals in Minnesota =

The following List of hospitals in the U.S. state of Minnesota is given in the order of the city where the hospital is or was located. It is also sortable by county, name, health system, and number of staffed beds. Hospitals that have closed are notated with the year of closing. Minnesota's oldest hospital is M Health Fairview's St. Joseph's Hospital in St. Paul, which first opened in 1853 in the Minnesota Territory. The largest hospital, in terms of staffed beds, is Mayo Clinic Hospital - Rochester, which was founded in 1864 by William and Charlie Mayo and has a total of 2,014 beds (1,220 beds at its St. Marys campus and 794 at its Methodist campus). There are twice as many rural hospitals as urban hospitals in Minnesota. In 2017, Minnesota hospitals provided 536,375 inpatient visits and nearly 12.7 million outpatient visits.

== Hospitals ==
According to the Minnesota Department of Health, there were 130 state licensed hospitals with 16,140 beds in 2019. There were an additional six federally licensed hospitals in Minnesota.

Hospitals in Minnesota
City	County	Hospital name	Health system (Note: Health system are usually listed on the hospital's website or the health system list of hospitals.)	Staffed beds (Note: Beds that are licensed and physically available for which staff is on hand to attend to the patient who occupies the bed. Staffed beds include those that are occupied and those that are vacant. In most instances, the number of beds is found in the American Hospital Directory.)	State licensed beds (2019) (Note: HOSP- Number of beds the hospital is licensed for by the state of Minnesota in 2019)	Opened, references
Ada	Norman	Essentia Health - Ada	Essentia Health	14	HOSP-14	1942
Aitkin	Aitkin	Aitkin Hospital	Riverwood Healthcare Center	25	HOSP-25	1948
Alexandria	Douglas	Alomere Health Hospital	Alomere Health	99	HOSP-127	1955
Appleton	Swift	Appleton Municipal Hospital	Appleton Area Health	62	HOSP-15	
Arlington	Sibley	Ridgeview Sibley Medical Center	Ridgeview	16	HOSP-20	1948
Aurora	Saint Louis	Essentia Health - Northern Pines	Essentia Health	49	HOSP-16	1961
Austin	Mower	Austin Hospital and Clinic	Mayo Clinic Health System	82		1882
Bagley	Clearwater	Bagley Medical Center	Sanford Health	25	HOSP-25	1949
Baudette	Lake of the Woods	LakeWood Health Center	CHI	15	HOSP-15	1950
Bemidji	Beltrami	Bemidji Medical Center	Sanford Health	118	HOSP-118	1899
Benson	Swift	CentraCare - Benson Hospital	CentraCare	18	HOSP-21	1912
Bigfork	Itasca	Bigfork Valley Hospital	Wilderness Health	60	HOSP-20	1941
Blue Earth	Faribault	United Hospital District Hospital	United Hospital District	24	HOSP-43	1886
Brainerd	Crow Wing	Essentia Health - St. Joseph's Medical Center	Essentia Health	162	HOSP-162	1890
Breckenridge	Wilkin	St. Francis Medical Center	CHI	105	HOSP-25	1899
Buffalo	Wright	Buffalo Hospital	Allina Health	44	HOSP-65	1951
Buffalo	Wright	Phillips Eye Institute	Allina Health	8	HOSP-20	2008
Burnsville	Dakota	M Health Fairview Ridges Hospital	M Health Fairview	171	HOSP-150	1984
Cambridge	Isanti	Cambridge Medical Center	Allina Health	70	HOSP-86	1956
Canby	Yellow Medicine	Canby Medical Center	Sanford Health	22	HOSP-25	
Cannon Falls	Goodhue	Cannon Falls Hospital and Clinic	Mayo Clinic Health System	15	HOSP-15	1958
Cass Lake	Cass	Cass Lake Hospital	Indian Health Service	4	Federal	1937
Chaska	Carver	Two Twelve Medical Center	Ridgeview	20	HOSP-20	2023
Cloquet	Carlton	Community Memorial Hospital	Wilderness Health	76	HOSP-36	1958
Cook	Saint Louis	Cook Hospital	Wilderness Health	42	HOSP-14	1959
Coon Rapids	Anoka	Mercy Hospital of Coon Rapids	Allina Health	481	HOSP-546	1965
Crookston	Polk	RiverView Health Clinic	RiverView Health	49	HOSP-49	
Crosby	Crow Wing	Cuyuna Regional Medical Center	Cuyuna Regional Medical Center	97	HOSP-42	1950s
Dawson	Lac qui Parle	Johnson Memorial Hospital and Home	Johnson Memorial Health Services	73	HOSP-20	
Deer River	Itasca	Deer River Health Care Center	Essentia Health	52	HOSP-20	1963
Detroit Lakes	Becker	St. Mary's Hospital	Essentia Health	130	HOSP-87	1905
Duluth	Saint Louis	Essentia Health-St. Mary's Medical Center (Note: Hospital moved, and new location opened in 2023)	Essentia Health	329	HOSP-380	Old, 1888 (Note: Original Location built that year)New, 2023 (Note: New location opened that year)
Duluth	Saint Louis	Essentia Health-Duluth - Miller-Dwan	Essentia Health	154	HOSP-165	
Duluth	Saint Louis	St. Luke's Hospital	Wilderness Health	257	HOSP-267	1882
Edina	Hennepin	M Health Fairview Southdale Hospital	M Health Fairview	334	HOSP-390	1965
Elbow Lake	Grant	Elbow Lake Medical Center (Note: Formerly Prairie Ridge Hospital and Health Services)	Lake Region Healthcare	10	HOSP-10	1961
Ely	Saint Louis	Ely-Bloomenson Community Hospital	Wilderness Health	16	HOSP-21	1958
Fairmont	Martin	Fairmont Hospital and Clinic	Mayo Clinic Health System	55	HOSP-57	1927
Faribault	Rice	Allina Health Faribault Medical Center (Note: District One Hospital in Faribault became Allina Health Faribault Medical Center on January 1, 2022.)	Allina Health	32	HOSP-49	1960
Fergus Falls	Otter Tail	Lake Region Hospital	Lake Region Healthcare	94	HOSP-108	1953
Fosston	Polk	Essentia Health - Fosston	Essentia Health	25	HOSP-43	1897
Fridley	Anoka	Mercy Hospital - Unity Campus	Allina Health	164		1966
Glencoe	McLeod	Glencoe Regional Health Services	Glencoe Regional Health Services	133	HOSP-49	1941
Glenwood	Pope County	Glacial Ridge Hospital	Glacial Ridge Health System	19	HOSP-34	1912
Golden Valley	Hennepin	Regency Hospital of Minneapolis	Regency Hospital, Inc.	92	HOSP-92	1950s (late)
Graceville	Big Stone	Essentia Health - Holy Trinity Hospital	Essentia Health	55	HOSP-15	1900
Grand Marais	Cook	North Shore Health	Wilderness Health	53	HOSP-16	1958
Grand Rapids	Itasca	Grand Itasca Clinic and Hospital	Fairview Health Services, Wilderness Health	36	HOSP-64	1917
Granite Falls	Chippewa or Yellow Medicine	Municipal Hospital and Granite Manor	Avera Health	30	HOSP-30	
Hallock	Kittson	Kittson Memorial Hospital	Kittson Healthcare	75	HOSP-15	1922
Hastings	Dakota	United Hospital - Regina Hastings Campus	Allina Health	43	HOSP-57	1953
Hendricks	Lincoln	Hendricks Community Hospital	Hendricks Community Healthcare Association	40	HOSP-24	
Hibbing	Saint Louis	Fairview Range Medical Center (Note: Fairview Range Medical Center was formerly the University Medical Center - Mesabi.)	Fairview Health Services, Wilderness Health	72	HOSP-175	
Hutchinson	McLeod	Hutchinson Health Hospital	HealthPartners	49	HOSP-66	1922
International Falls	Koochiching	Rainy Lake Medical Center	Wilderness Health	18	HOSP-25	
Jackson	Jackson	Jackson Medical Center	Sanford Health	14	HOSP-20	
Lake City	Wabasha	Lake City Hospital and Clinic	Mayo Clinic Health System	108	HOSP-18	
Le Sueur	Le Sueur	Ridgeview Le Sueur Medical Center	Ridgeview	59	HOSP-15	
Litchfield	Meeker	Meeker Memorial Hospital	Meeker Memorial Hospital and Clinics	35	HOSP-35	1952
Little Falls	Morrison	St. Gabriel Hospital	CHI	25	HOSP-49	
Long Prairie	Todd	CentraCare - Long Prairie Hospital (Note: In 2016, a $2.5 million goal was met by local residents, businesses and CentraCare employees to build a new medical campus. In 2017, the new hospital and clinic opened.)	CentraCare	74	HOSP-34	
Luverne	Rock	Luverne Medical Center	Sanford Health	25	HOSP-28	
Madelia	Watonwan	Madelia Community Hospital	Madelia Health	25	HOSP-25	
Madison	Lac qui Parle	Madison Hospital	Madison Healthcare Services	74	HOSP-12	
Mahnomen	Mahnomen	Mahnomen Health Center	Mahnomen Health Care	42	HOSP-18	
Mankato	Blue Earth	Mayo Clinic Health System - Mankato Hospital and Clinic (Note: Formerly Immanuel-St. Joseph's Hospital)	Mayo Clinic Health System	239	HOSP-272	1898
Maple Grove	Hennepin	Maple Grove Hospital	North Memorial Health	134	HOSP-130	2009
Maplewood	Ramsey	St. John's Hospital	M Health Fairview	184	HOSP-184	1911
Marshall	Lyon	Avera Marshall Regional Medical Center	Avera Health	101	HOSP-25	
Melrose	Stearns	CentraCare - Melrose Hospital	CentraCare	89	HOSP-28	
Minneapolis	Hennepin	Abbott Northwestern Hospital	Allina Health	686	HOSP-952	1882
Minneapolis	Hennepin	Children's Minnesota - Minneapolis Hospital	Children's Minnesota	381 (Note: Combined total for Children's Minnesota St. Paul and Minneapolis)	HOSP-279	1924
Minneapolis	Hennepin	Hennepin County Medical Center	Hennepin Healthcare	465	HOSP-894	1887
Minneapolis	Hennepin	Minneapolis VA Health Care System	USDVA	845	Federal	1920
Minneapolis	Hennepin	M Health Fairview University of Minnesota Medical Center	M Health Fairview	828	HOSP-1700	1911
Minneapolis	Hennepin	M Health Fairview University of Minnesota Medical Center - West Bank Center	M Health Fairview	0		
Minneapolis	Hennepin	M Health Fairview University of Minnesota Masonic Children's Hospital	M Health Fairview	212		1986
Minneapolis	Hennepin	Phillips Eye Institute	Allina Health	8	HOSP-20	1987
Monticello	Wright	CentraCare - Monticello Hospital (Note: Monticell Hospital was originally known as the Monticello--Big Lake Community Hospital.)	CentraCare	124	HOSP-39	1965
Montevideo	Chippewa	Chippewa City Montevideo Hospital	CCM Health	25	HOSP-30	
Moose Lake	Carlton	Mercy Hospital	Essentia Health	25	HOSP-25	1963
Mora	Kanabec	Welia Health (FirstLight) Mora Hospital	Welia Health	25	HOSP-49	
Morris	Stevens	Steven Community Medical Center	Steven Community Medical Center	25	HOSP-49	
New Prague	Scott	New Prague Hospital	Mayo Clinic Health System	20	HOSP-49	
New Ulm	Brown	New Ulm Medical Center	Allina Health	34	HOSP-62	1883
Northfield	Dakota	Northfield City Hospital	Northfield Hospital + Clinics	77	HOSP-37	
Onamia	Mille Lacs	Mille Lacs Health System Onamia Hospital	Mille Lacs Health System	82	HOSP-28	1956
Olivia	Renville	Olivia Hospital and Clinics	HealthPartners	16	HOSP-16	1951
Ortonville	Big Stone	Ortonville Hospital	Ortonville Area Health Services	76	HOSP-25	
Owatonna	Steele	Owatonna Clinic (Note: The Owatonna Clinic offers outpatient services and is adjacent to the Owatonn Hospital.)	Mayo Clinic Health System	0		1948
Owatonna	Steele	Owatonna Hospital	Allina Health	39	HOSP-43	1901
Park Rapids	Hubbard	St. Josephs Area Health Services	CHI	25	HOSP-50	1946
Paynesville	Stearns	CentraCare - Paynesville Hospital	CentraCare	25	HOSP-30	1956
Perham	Otter Tail	Perham Health Hospital	Perham Health, in affiliation with Sanford Health	25	HOSP-25	1902
Pipestone	Pipestone	Pipestone County Medical Center	Avera Health	18	HOSP-44	
Plymouth	Hennepin	Abbott Northwestern WestHealth	Allina Health	50	HOSP-50	2015
Princeton	Mille Lacs	Northland Medical Center	M Health Fairview	33	HOSP-54	1993
Red Lake	Beltrami	Red Lake Indian Health Services Hospital	Indian Health Service	23	Federal	
Red Wing	Goodhue	Red Wing Hospital and Clinic	Mayo Clinic Health System	50	HOSP-50	1883
Redwood Falls	Redwood	CentraCare - Redwood Hospital	CentraCare	14	HOSP-25	
Robbinsdale	Hennepin	North Memorial Health Hospital	North Memorial Health	385	HOSP-518	1954
Rochester	Olmsted	Federal Medical Center, Rochester - Prison	Federal Bureau of Prisons	-	Federal	1984
Rochester	Olmsted	Mayo Clinic Hospital - Rochester, Methodist Campus	Mayo Clinic	794		1954
Rochester	Olmsted	Mayo Clinic Hospital - Rochester, Saint Marys Campus	Mayo Clinic	1,220	HOSP-2059	1889
Rochester	Olmsted	Olmsted Medical Center	Olmsted Medical Center	61	HOSP-61	1949
Roseau	Roseau	LifeCare Medical Center	LifeCare Medical Center	75	HOSP-25	
St. Cloud	Stearns	St. Cloud Hospital	CentraCare	477	HOSP-489	1886
St. Cloud	Stearns	St. Cloud VA Health Care System	USDVA	-	Federal	1923
St. James	Watonwan	St. James Hospital and Clinic	Mayo Clinic Health System	25	HOSP-25	
St. Louis Park	Hennepin	Park Nicollet Methodist Hospital	HealthPartners	361	HOSP-426	1959
St. Paul	Ramsey	Children's Minnesota - St. Paul Hospital	Children's Minnesota	381 (Note: 381 combined total for St. Paul and Minneapolis Children's Minnesota hospitals)		1924
St. Paul	Ramsey	Gillette Children's Specialty Healthcare (St. Paul Hospital)	Gillette Children's Specialty Healthcare	60	HOSP-60	1897
St. Paul	Ramsey	Regions Hospital	HealthPartners	452	HOSP-474	1872
St. Paul	Ramsey	United Hospital	Allina Health	365	HOSP-546	1877
St. Peter	Nicollet	River's Edge Hospital	River's Edge	25	HOSP-17	
Sandstone	Pine	Sandstone Critical Access Hospital (Pine Medical Center)	Essentia Health	9	HOSP-30	1956
Sandstone	Pine	Federal Correction Institution Hospital	Federal Bureau of Prisons	-	Federal	
Sauk Centre	Stearns	CentraCare - Sauk Centre Hospital (Note: Formerly St. Michaels Hospital)	CentraCare	25	HOSP-28	
Shakopee	Scott	St. Francis Regional Medical Center	Allina Health	89	HOSP-93	1938
Slayton	Murray	Murray County Medical Center	Sanford Health	21	HOSP-25	
Sleepy Eye	Brown	Sleepy Eye Medical Center	Sleepy Eye Medical Center	16	HOSP-16	
Staples	Todd or Wadena	Lakewood Health System Critical Care Hospital	Lakewood Health System	25	HOSP-37	1937
Stillwater	Washington	Lakeview Hospital	HealthPartners	68	HOSP-97	1880
Thief River Falls	Pennington	Northwest Medical Center	Sanford Health	25	HOSP-26	
Tracy	Lyon	Tracy Medical Center	Sanford Health	25	HOSP-25	1961
Two Harbors	Lake	Lake View Memorial Hospital	Wilderness Health	16	HOSP-25	1956
Tyler	Lincoln	Tyler Hospital	Avera Health	51	HOSP-20	
Virginia	Saint Louis	Virginia Hospital	Essentia Health	124	HOSP-83, HOSP-67	1936
Wabasha	Wabasha	St. Elizabeths Medical Center	Gundersen Health System	114	HOSP-25	
Waconia	Carver	Ridgeview Medical Center	Ridgeview	109	HOSP-109	1963
Wadena	Otter Tail or Wadena	Wadena Clinic	Astera Health, Tri-County Healthcare	25	HOSP-49	1925
Warren	Marshall	North Valley Health Center	North Valley Health Center	12	HOSP-12	1905
Waseca	Waseca	Waseca Hospital and Clinic	Mayo Clinic Health System	15	HOSP-35	1922
Westbrook	Cottonwood	Westbrook Medical Center	Sanford Health	8	HOSP-8	1951
Wheaton	Traverse	Wheaton Medical Center	Sanford Health	15	HOSP-25	1964
Willmar	Kandiyohi	CentraCare - Rice Memorial Hospital	CentraCare	159	HOSP-136	1937
Windom	Cottonwood	Windom Area Hospital	Sanford Health	18	HOSP-18	1905
Winona	Winona	Winona Community Memorial Hospital	Winona Health	41	HOSP-49	1894
Woodbury	Washington	Shriners Children's Twin Cities	Shriners Children's	-	HOSP-86	1923 original location in Minneapolis; 2020
Woodbury	Washington	Woodwinds Health Campus	M Health Fairview	86	HOSP-86	2000
Worthington	Nobles	Worthington Medical Center	Sanford Health	48	HOSP-48	1929
Wyoming	Chisago	Lakes Medical Center	M Health Fairview	55	HOSP-61	1998

== Defunct hospitals ==
- Abbott Hospital, Minneapolis, merged with Northwestern Hospital in 1980
- Albany Area Hospital and Medical Center, Albany, closed in 2015
- Albert Lea Hospital and Clinic, Albert Lea (Mayo Clinic Health System), closed in 2019
- Asbury Hospital, near Elliot Park in Minneapolis, 350 beds, became United States Veterans Hospital Number 68 in 1921.
- Bethesda Hospital (Saint Paul, Minnesota), closed in 2020
- Eitel Hospital, Minneapolis, closed in 1985
- Fairview Milaca Hospital (originally known as Milaca Memorial Hospital), closed in 1991
- Fergus Falls Regional Treatment Center, Fergus Falls, closed in 2005
- Gaylord Community Hospital, Gaylord, Minnesota, closed in 1989
- Glen Lake Sanatorium, Minnetonka, closed in 1976
- Dr. E.P. Hawkins Clinic, Hospital, and House, Montrose
- Lakeside Medical Center, Pine City, closed in 2010
- Mayo Clinic Health System Springfield, Springfield, HOSP-24, closed in 2020
- Metropolitan Medical Center, Minneapolis, merged with Mount Sinai Hospital (Minneapolis) in 1990 and closed in 1991 - buildings taken over by Hennepin County Medical Center
- Midway Hospital, St. Paul, closed in 1997
- Minnesota Correctional Facility – Faribault (former mental hospital), closed in 1989
- Minnesota Correctional Facility – Willow River/Moose Lake (former Moose Lake Regional Treatment Center), Moose Lake, closed in 1988
- Minnesota State Sanatorium for Consumptives, Walker, closed in 2008
- Mount Sinai Hospital, Minneapolis, merged with Metropolitan Medical Center (Minneapolis) in 1990 and closed in 1991
- Phillip Eye Hospital, Minneapolis, closed in 2022
- Ripley Memorial Hospital, Minneapolis, closed before 2007
- Rudolph Latto House, Hastings, closed in 1949
- St. Ansgar Hospital, Moorhead, closed in 1990
- St. Joseph's Hospital, St. Paul, closed in December 2020
- St. Mary's Hospital, Winstead, closed in 1989
- Tanner's Hospital, Ely
- Thompson–Fasbender House, Hastings, closed in 1953
- White Earth Hospital, closed late 1940s

== Psychiatric hospitals and centers ==
- Anoka Metro Regional Treatment Center, Anoka
- Fergus Falls Regional Treatment Center, Fergus Falls (closed in 2005)
- Minnesota Security Hospital (formerly St. Peter State Hospital), St. Peter
- Sanford Health Behavioral Health Center, Thief River Falls, PSY-HOSP-16

== Health care systems ==
The following health care systems are located in Minnesota:

- Allina Health
- Alomere Health
- Altru Health System
- Avera Health
- Catholic Health Initiatives (CHI)
- CentraCare
- Children's Minnesota
- Essentia Health
- Gillette Children's Specialty Healthcare
- Gundersen Health System
- HealthPartners
- HealthEast Care System (defunct 2019 - now part of M Health Fairview)
- Hennepin Healthcare
- Indian Health Services
- Lake Region Healthcare
- Lakewood Health System
- Mayo Clinic Health System
- M Health Fairview
- North Memorial Health
- Ridgeview
- Riverwood Healthcare Center
- Sanford Health
- Shriners Children's
- St. Francis Regional Medical Center (Minnesota)
- Wilderness Health
