= List of the oldest hospitals in the United States =

Geographic distribution of the oldest active hospitals (established pre-1900) in the United States

The following is a list of the oldest hospitals in the United States, containing extant hospitals in the United States established prior to the year 1900. The dates refer to the foundation or the earliest documented contemporary reference to the hospital.

== Hospitals ==
=== 18th century ===
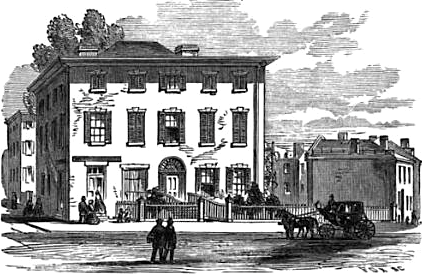
Boston Dispensary, 1859

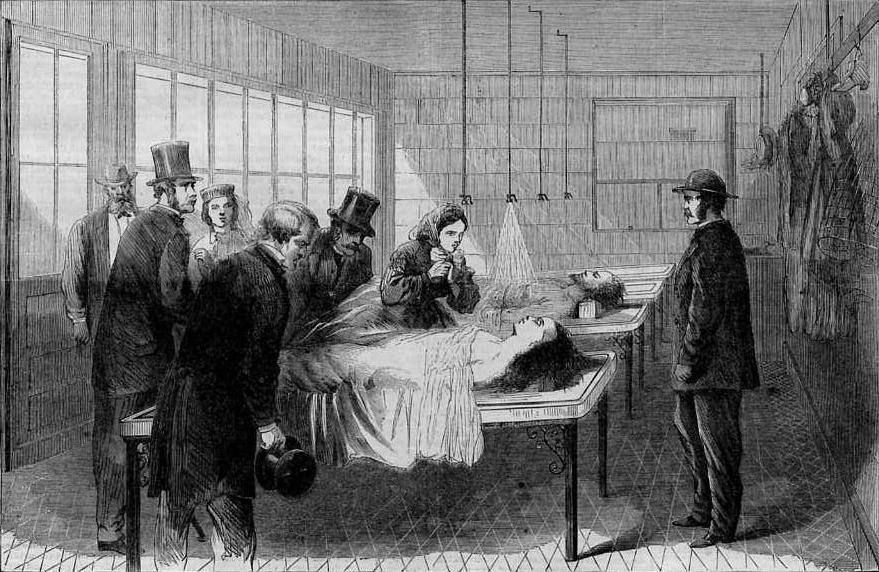
Bellevue Hospital morgue, 1859

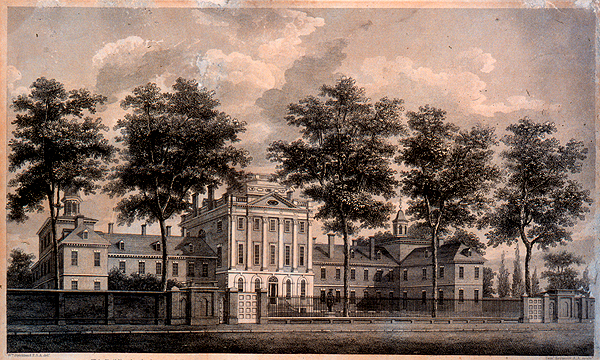
Pennsylvania Hospital, 1811

Est.	Name	Location	Notes	Ref.
1736	Bellevue Hospital	New York City, New York (Manhattan); 40.7122°N 74.0072°W	Public hospital. Formerly known as Bellevue Hospital Center. Renamed NYC Health + Hospitals/Bellevue Hospital Center in November 2015. It is the oldest U.S. hospital in continuous operation.	
1736	Charity Hospital	New Orleans, Louisiana; 29.9554°N 90.0780°W	Defunct public hospital. It was originally named the Hospital of Saint John or L’Hôpital des Pauvres de la Charité (The Charity Hospital for the Poor). Charity Hospital sustained severe flood damage during Hurricane Katrina and was closed.	
1751	Pennsylvania Hospital	Philadelphia, Pennsylvania; 39°56′41.2″N 75°9′22.56″W	Private, non-profit hospital founded by Ben Franklin.	
1771	New York Hospital	New York City, New York (Manhattan); 40.8413°N 73.9428°W	Now known as Weill Cornell Medical Center, it is the primary teaching hospital of Weill Cornell Medicine. In 1998 it merged with Presbyterian Hospital to form NewYork–Presbyterian Hospital.	
1773	Johns Hopkins Bayview Medical Center	Baltimore, Maryland; 39.2929°N 76.5513°W	Teaching hospital. Originally called Baltimore County and Town Almshouse.	
1796	Boston Dispensary	Boston, Massachusetts; 42.34951°N 71.06331°W	Public hospital. Merged with Tufts Medical Center in 1930	

=== Nineteenth century ===
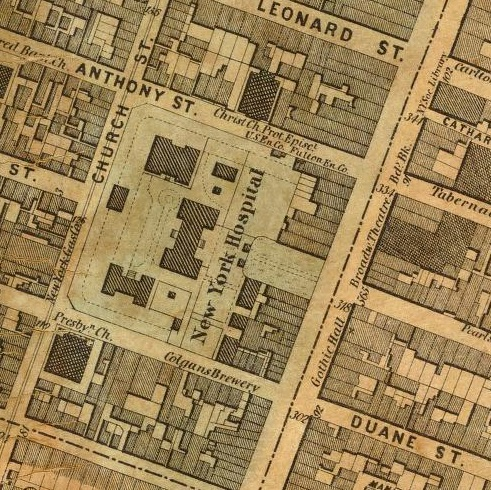
New York Hospital, 1852 map

Est.	Name	Location	Notes	Ref.
1804	Candler Hospital	Savannah, Georgia; 32.027365°N 81.099214°W	It was originally founded in 1804 as a Seamen's Hospital and poor house and eventually became known as Savannah Hospital. Later, it merged with St. Joseph's. It is the second oldest hospital in America in continuous operation.	
1806	District of Columbia General Hospital	Washington, D.C. 38°53′7.70″N 76°58′27.96″W	Originally called Washington Infirmary, established by Congress, closed in 2001	
1811	Massachusetts General Hospital	Boston, Massachusetts; 42°21′46.10″N 71°04′07.07″W	It is the original and largest teaching hospital of Harvard Medical School.	
1811	McLean Hospital	Belmont, Massachusetts; 42°23′37″N 71°11′28″W	It was formerly known as Somerville Asylum and Charlestown Asylum.	
1813	Friends Hospital	Philadelphia, Pennsylvania; 40°1′36.25″N 75°5′59.1″W	First private hospital for the insane in the U.S.	
1818	University Hospital	Augusta, Georgia; 33.473°N 81.982°W	Now known as Piedmont Augusta.	
1823	Baltimore Infirmary	Baltimore, Maryland	The country's first hospital built specifically to teach medical students	
1825	Thomas Jefferson University Hospital	Philadelphia, Pennsylvania; 39.949691°N 75.157124°W	Originally founded as the infirmary of the Jefferson Medical college.	
1826	General Hospital Society of Connecticut	New Haven, Connecticut; 41°18′14″N 72°56′10″W	Originally founded as General Hospital Society of Connecticut. Merged with Grace Hospital in 1945. Now known as Yale New Haven Hospital	
1828	Hospital of the Sisters of Charity	Saint Louis, Missouri	Founded by the Daughters of Charity of Saint Vincent de Paul. The first Catholic hospital in the United States and the first hospital West of the Mississippi River. It is the earliest predecessor of SSM Health DePaul Hospital.	
1830	Naval Medical Center Portsmouth	Portsmouth, Virginia; 36°50′51″N 76°18′17″W	The oldest continuously running hospital in the US Navy	
1831	John H. Stroger Jr. Hospital of Cook County	Chicago, Illinois; 41°52′20″N 87°40′29″W		
1832	City Hospital	New York City, New York (Manhattan); 40°45′11″N 73°57′31″W		
1837	City Hospital	Cleveland, Ohio	Originally founded as City Hospital in 1837, functioned as infirmary for the city of Cleveland, now known as the MetroHealth System.	
1839	Lincoln Hospital	New York City, New York (Bronx); 40°49′N 73°55′W	Originally called The Home for the Colored Aged	
1842	New Hampshire State Hospital	Concord, New Hampshire		
1844	Butler Hospital	Providence, Rhode Island; 41°50′46.68″N 71°23′09.93″W		
1845	Brooklyn Hospital Center.	New York City, New York (Brooklyn); 40.6901°N 73.9772°W	founded in May 1845 as "Brooklyn City Hospital", following a public meeting convened by Mayor Smith of what was then Brooklyn City.	
1847	Mercy Hospital	Pittsburgh, Pennsylvania; 40.4363°N 79.9851°W	now known as University of Pittsburgh Medical Center Mercy	
1848	Trenton Psychiatric Hospital	Trenton, New Jersey; 40.246°N 74.805°W	Founded by Dorothea Lynde Dix on May 15, 1848, it was the first public mental hospital in the state of New Jersey. It previously operated under the name New Jersey State Hospital at Trenton and originally as the New Jersey State Lunatic Asylum.	
1850	San Francisco General Hospital	San Francisco, California; 37°45′20″N 122°24′18″W		
1850	Wheeling Hospital	Wheeling, West Virginia; 40°03′31.5″N 80°41′03.8″W		
1852	Touro Infirmary	New Orleans, Louisiana; 29.925841°N 90.092261°W	It is best known for its Family Birthing Center and for founding the first rehabilitation program.	
1853	St. Joseph's Hospital	St. Paul, Minnesota; 44°56′57″N 93°6′0″W	Closed 2020	
1854	Grace Hospital	New Haven, Connecticut; 41°18′14″N 72°56′10″W	Merged with Yale-New Haven Hospital in 1945.	
1854	Hartford Hospital	Hartford, Connecticut		
1856	St. Vincent Medical Center	Los Angeles, California		
1856	Providence Sacred Heart Medical Center	Spokane, Washington		
1857	Lenox Hill Hospital	New York City, New York (Manhattan)		
1857	St. Mary's Medical Center	San Francisco, California	St. Mary's Medical Center (SMMC) is the oldest continuously operating hospital and the first Catholic hospital in San Francisco. St. Mary's Hospital was opened on July 27, 1857 by the Sisters of Mercy.	
1858	St. Joseph Community Hospital	Vancouver, Washington	Merged PeaceHealth Southwest Medical Center, 2010	
1858	Long Island College Hospital	New York City, New York (Brooklyn)	Defunct hospital that closed in 2014. It was the first teaching hospital as well as the first to use stethoscopes and anesthesia in the United States.	
1859	Kalamazoo Regional Psychiatric Hospital	Kalamazoo, Michigan		
1859	The Queen's Medical Center	Honolulu, Hawaii		
1860	Denver Health Medical Center	Denver, Colorado		
1861	Staten Island University Hospital	New York City, New York (Staten Island)		
1862	Freedman's Hospital	Washington, D.C. (District of Columbia)		
1862	Oregon State Hospital	Salem, Oregon		
1863	Rhode Island Hospital	Providence, Rhode Island		
1863	Harper Hospital	Detroit, Michigan		
1864	Einstein Medical Center	Philadelphia, Pennsylvania	Began as the Jewish hospital for aged, infirm and destitute.	
1865	St. Vincent Charity Medical Center	Cleveland, Ohio	St. Vincent Charity Medical Center	
1864	Boston City Hospital	Boston, Massachusetts	Merged Boston Medical Center, 1996	
1864	Mayo Clinic	Rochester, Minnesota; 44°1′20″N 92°28′0″W	Noted for the content of integrated multispecialty practice.	
1866	St. Barnabas Hospital (Bronx)	New York City, New York (The Bronx)	Began as the Home for the Incurables	
1866	St. Elizabeth's Medical Center (Boston)	Brighton, Massachusetts		
1866	University Hospitals Case Medical Center	Cleveland, Ohio		
1866	St. Mary's Hospital	Galveston, Texas	Began as Charity Infirmary, first Catholic and private hospital in Texas	
1867	Saint Michael's Medical Center	Newark, New Jersey		
1867	Cheyenne Regional Medical Center	Cheyenne, Wyoming		
1868	Hutzel Women's Hospital	Detroit, Michigan		
1868	Presbyterian Hospital	New York City, New York (Manhattan)	Now known as Columbia Univ Medical Center, it is the primary teaching hospital of Columbia University College of Physicians and Surgeons. In 1998 it merged with New York Hospital to form NewYork–Presbyterian Hospital.	
1869	Santa Rosa Infirmary	San Antonio, Texas	later became CHRISTUS Health	
1869	St. Joseph's Hospital Health Center	Syracuse, New York		
1869	University of Michigan Health System	Ann Arbor, Michigan		
1870	Children's National Medical Center	Washington, D. C.	Formerly referred to as D.C. Children's Hospital	
1871	Western State Hospital	Lakewood, Washington		
1872	Providence St. John Hospital	Detroit, Michigan		
1873	St. Patrick Hospital	Missoula, Montana		
1874	Maine Medical Center	Portland, Maine		
1875	Providence St. Vincent Hospital	Portland, Oregon		
1875	Good Samaritan Hospital	Portland, Oregon	Merged Legacy Good Samaritan Medical Center, 1989	
1875	St. Mary's of Michigan Medical Center	Saginaw, Michigan		
1875	Butterworth Hospital	Grand Rapids, Michigan		
1875	Napa State Hospital	Napa, California		
1876	OSF Saint Francis Medical Center	Peoria, Illinois		
1876	Santa Clara Valley Medical Center	San Jose, California		
1877	Bridgeport Hospital	Bridgeport, Connecticut		
1877	Harborview Medical Center	Seattle, Washington		
1877	Montana State Hospital	Warm Springs, Montana		
1878	Roger Williams Medical Center	Providence, Rhode Island		
1878	St. Helena Hospital	St. Helena, California		
1879	The University of Vermont Medical Center	Burlington, Vermont	Founded as Mary Fletcher Hospital	
1881	Hamot Medical Center	Erie, Pennsylvania	Now UPMC Hamot	
1883	Sinai-Grace Hospital	Detroit, Michigan		
1883	Springfield Hospital	Springfield, Massachusetts	Merged Baystate Health, 1986	
1884	Concord Hospital	Concord, New Hampshire		
1884	Montefiore Home for Chronic Invalids	New York City, New York (The Bronx)	Now Montefiore Medical Center	
1884	Memorial Hospital	New York City, New York (Manhattan)	Now Memorial Sloan Kettering Cancer Center	
1885	Traverse City State Hospital	Traverse City, Michigan		
1885	North Dakota State Hospital	Jamestown, North Dakota		
1885	Agnews Developmental Center	Santa Clara, California		
1885	Good Samaritan Hospital	Los Angeles, California		
1885	Terrell State Hospital	Terrell, Texas		
1885	St Joseph's Hospital	Chippewa Falls, Wisconsin	Now HSHS St. Joseph's Hospital, Chippewa Falls, WI	
1886	Children's Hospital of Michigan	Detroit, Michigan		
1886	Grace Hospital	Seattle, Washington		
1886	Bartlett Regional Hospital	Juneau, Alaska		
1887	Providence St. Peter Hospital	Olympia, Washington		
1887	Minneapolis City Hospital	Minneapolis, Minnesota		
1887	Cooper University Health Care	Camden, New Jersey		
1888	Hackensack University Medical Center	Hackensack, New Jersey		
1889	Johns Hopkins Hospital	Baltimore, Maryland		
1889	Flagler Hospital	Saint Augustine, Florida		
1890	Jefferson Healthcare Hospital	Port Townsend, Washington		
1890	Bronx-Lebanon Hospital Center	New York City, New York (The Bronx)		
1890	Scripps Mercy Hospital	San Diego, California		
1891	Mary Free Bed Rehabilitation Hospital	Grand Rapids, Michigan		
1891	Eastern State Hospital	Medical Lake, Washington		
1892	St. Ignatius Hospital	Colfax, Washington		
1892	Huntington Hospital	Pasadena, California		
1893	Mary Hitchcock Memorial Hospital	Hanover, New Hampshire	Merged Dartmouth-Hitchcock Medical Center, 1927	
1893	Presbyterian Hospital	Pittsburgh, Pennsylvania	Merged University of Pittsburgh Medical Center, 1908	
1893	Adventist Medical Center	Portland, Oregon		
1894	Parkland Memorial Hospital	Dallas, Texas		
1894	Winona Health	Winona, Minnesota		
1896	Sparrow Hospital	Lansing, Michigan		
1896	Deaconess Hospital	Spokane, Washington		
1896	NYU Langone Hospital – Long Island	Mineola, New York	Opened as Nassau Hospital. It was the first hospital on Long Island at a time when the surrounding area was primarily rural and agricultural.	
1897	St. Elizabeth Hospital	Baker City, Oregon		
1898	Georgetown University Hospital	Washington, D.C.	Merged MedStar Georgetown University Hospital, 2000	
1898	Mayo Clinic Health System - Mankato	Mankato, Minnesota	Formerly Immanuel-St. Joseph's Hospital	
1898	Gritman Medical Center	Moscow, Idaho		
1899	Calvary Hospital (Bronx)	New York City, New York (The Bronx)		
1899	Walla Walla General Hospital	Walla Walla, Washington		
1899	Parker Memorial Hospital	Columbia, Missouri	First Hospital at the University of Missouri	

== See also ==
- History of medicine in the United States
- History of public health in the United States
- History of public health in New York City
