= Meridian Behavioral Health =

Minnesota-based substance use disorder treatment organization

- Industry: Alcohol and Drug Addiction Treatment
- Headquarters: New Brighton, Minnesota, U.S.
- Website: meridianprograms.com

Meridian Behavioral Health is a provider of behavioral health services in the Midwestern United States. The company operates twenty Commission on Accreditation of Rehabilitation Facilities (CARF) accredited substance use disorder (SUD) facilities in Minnesota providing residential and outpatient treatment for those suffering from a chemical dependency or addiction. The company is based in the Twin Cities of Minneapolis-St. Paul and its operations date back to the 1970s through Twin Town Treatment Center.

== Company history ==
In 2007, Triton Pacific Capital Partners, a private equity firm, sponsored a recapitalization of the company.

In 2011, the company jointly filed Chapter 11 bankruptcy alongside its struggling sister company MK Network, LLC which was a provider of continuing medical education.

In 2014, the company acquired Douglas Place an 85-bed residential treatment center in East Grand Forks, Minnesota. Shortly after the acquisition, the facility experienced difficulties with leadership and faced a state investigation.

In 2015, Audax Group, a private equity firm, acquired the company from Triton Pacific Capital Partners for $120 million.

In 2015, the company opened an addiction treatment center referred to as the Beauterre Recovery Institute in Owatonna, Minnesota which focused on care for licensed professionals. The property was previously known as the Daniel C. Gainey Conference Center, which was a venue for retreats and planning meetings and was operated by University of St. Thomas.

In 2016, the company acquired Valhalla Place, a medication-assisted treatment (MAT) program in Minnesota. Valhalla Place and its affiliated laboratory were later divested to Behavioral Health Group in 2021.

In 2016, the company acquired Stadter Center, a psychiatric hospital in Grand Forks, North Dakota and rebranded the facility as Red River Behavioral Health System. The location later filed for bankruptcy in 2021 due to COVID-19 related issues.

In 2016, the company acquired Serenity Acres Treatment Center a substance abuse treatment program based in Annapolis, Maryland. Serenity Acres was founded by entrepreneur Larry Adler. This facility was later closed in 2019 and laid off 65 employees in the process.

In 2017, the company acquired Valley Vista, an 80-bed residential treatment facility in Bradford, Vermont, from founders Rick DiStefano and Jack Duffy. The founders later acquired Valley Vista back from the company in May 2020.

In 2017, the company acquired New Beginnings Minnesota, an operator of seven addiction-treatment facilities throughout Minnesota.

In 2020, the company took over a residential treatment facility named Journey Home in Sauk Rapids, Minnesota from CentraCare Health. Before the change in ownership, the center was slated to close.
