= Lakewood Health System =

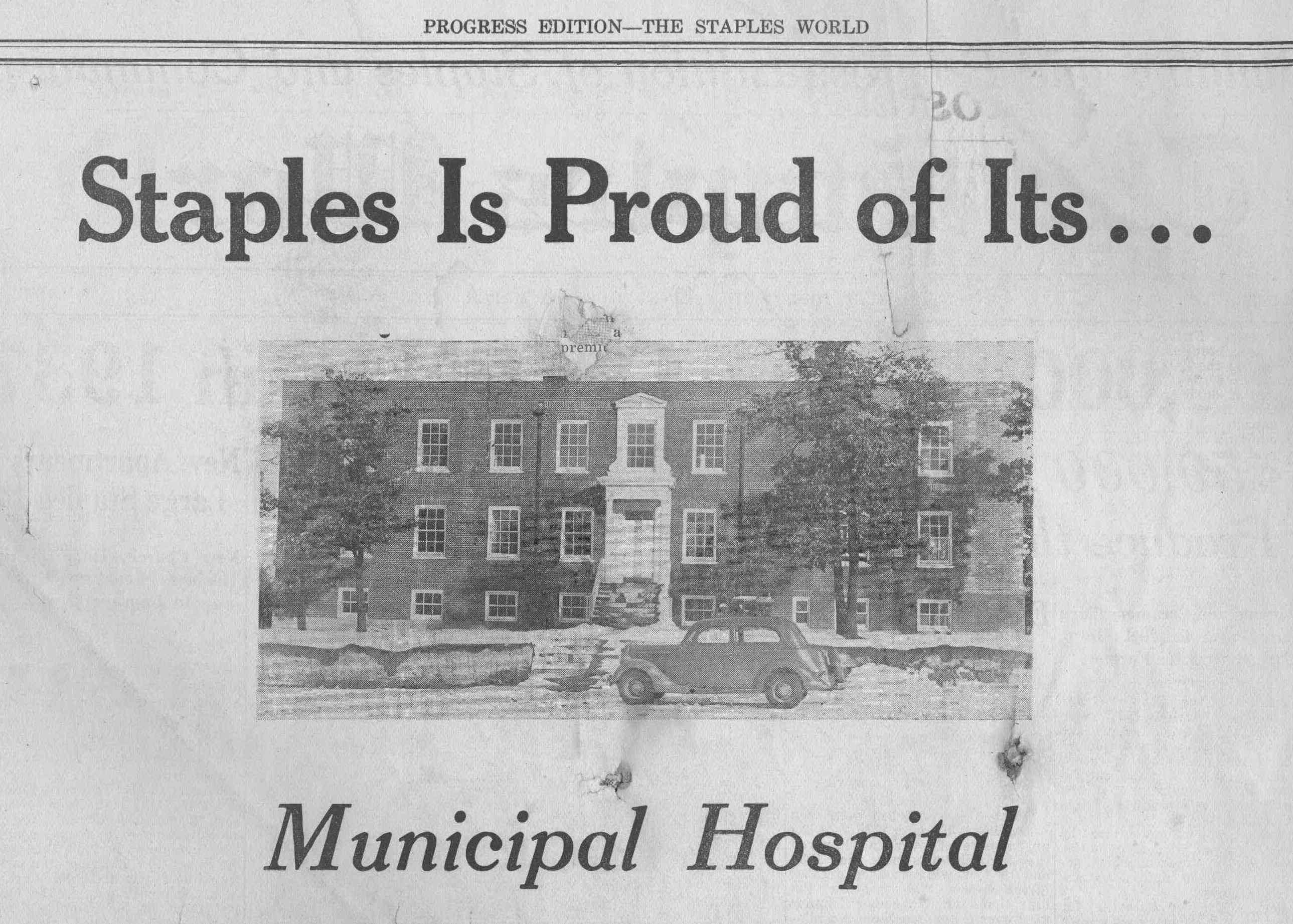
- Staples Municipal Hospital, 1938

Geography
- Location: Staples, Minnesota, United States
- Coordinates: 46°21′N 94°45′W

History
- Former name: Staples Municipal Hospital
- Opened: 1937

Links
- Website: www.lakewoodhealthsystem.com
- Lists: Hospitals in Minnesota

Lakewood Health System is a not-for-profit healthcare facility located in Staples, Minnesota. Lakewood Health System was created from a long lineage of healthcare systems dating back to 1936. Lakewood Health System's first name was the Staples Municipal Hospital. Over a period of years, the system became a not-for-profit and a board was elected to manage profits and debts to serve the communities within its service area.

== History ==
The Staples Municipal Hospital had its first patient on April 12, 1937. Jerry Martin, son of Mr. and Mrs. George Martin had a tonsillectomy. Medical staff included Dr. P.C. Benton, Dr. Jay M. Cook, Dr. E.P. Costain, Dr. W.J. Lund, Dr. C.F. Reichelderfer, Dr. Eugene Skinner and Dr. E.A. St. Pierre.

The building that housed the Staples Municipal Hospital was completed in November, 1936, but selection, purchasing and installation of equipment pushed back the opening date. Miss Dorothy E. Smith was the first superintendent and served April 12, 1937 – July 1, 1937 until she resigned due to her mother's illness. Miss Cora L. Anderson succeeded Smith.

Mrs. Bernice Burdette served as hospital administration for 10 years, 1960-1970 until Gary Kenner took over in October, 1970. During Kenner's administration, the concept of a united district hospital was born. In the years 1971 and 1972, two cities and 10 townships voted to combine and create the United District Hospital. Villard Township was the first to pass a vote on November 9, 1971. On March 16, 1972, The City of Staples and Staples Township approved the concept. Becker Township approved on March 20, 1972. At the time, the city of Motley was considered a “village.” The Village of Motley and Motley Township passed on March 30, 1972. Moran, Meadowbrook and Thomastown townships approved on November 7, 1972. Also joining the district hospital on November 7, 1972, was Byron Township.

Board members were elected on January 16, 1973. Representing the City of Staples was Vern Siepkes, winning by a draw. Thomastown Township: Paul Wicht. Staples Township: Grace LeVasseur. Village of Motley: Marvin Shequen. Motley Township: Donald Gold. Becker Township: Eugene Ulring. Villard Township: Reuben Judd. Member at Large: Don P. Peterson. The first United District Hospital Board meeting was held on February 1, 1973. As of this date, the United District Hospital replaced the Staples Municipal Hospital plan of ownership.

In May 1973, Moose Lake Township joined the United District Hospital and named Mrs. Maurice Davis, Jr. as representing board member. Poplar Township joined December 3, 1974 and appointed Mrs. Lillian Johnson as representative.

In 1974, the United District Hospital served 9,000 people in four counties: Todd, Wadena, Crow Wing and Morrison.

In October 1974, “the Central Minnesota Health Planning Council approved in full a certificate of need for a new, 100-bed nursing home, sought by the United District Hospital in Staples.”

The $3,319,404 modernization project built a new 40-bed hospital and 100-bed nursing home on the north end of Staples to replace the services offered by the existing 84-bed Mary Rondorf long-term care facility. The plan was overwhelmingly endorsed by the City of Staples with 1,139 “for” votes and 297 opposing votes. The new facility opened November 13, 1977 following an open house. Bor-Son Construction, Inc. of Minneapolis was the general contractor for the project. The new name: United District Hospital and Home. The facility was paid for through the sale of bonds on behalf of the United District Hospital Board. No taxes were needed to support the project.

On May 14, 1979, Gary Kenner, hospital administrator submitted resignation to accept a position at Unity Hospital in Grafton, North Dakota to be closer to his and his wife's families. However, the United District Hospital Board asked Kenner to reconsider to tie up loose ends. It wasn't until Tim Rice was hired in February, 1980 that Kenner left. Rice attended Minnesota Business School in Minneapolis.

In 1979, the medical staff in the community of Staples included Dr. D.A. Amundson, Dr. T.J. Lelwica, Dr. W.I. Mennis, Dr. V.J. Thompson and Dr. R.L. Weber.

In March, 1987, a remodel began on the United District Hospital building to house more services. The remodel also included adding private patient rooms and automatic doors. Charles D. Johnson construction managed the project.

In December, 1990, United District Hospital assumed the operation of the Lakewood Clinic in Eagle Bend. Within a year, Lakewood Clinic planned to build a connecting clinic to United District Hospital and Home. Construction began in September 1991 and physicians moved in May 1992. At the completion of the project, United District Hospital and Home was renamed to Greater Staples Hospital and Greater Staples Care Center. An open house was held on Sunday, October 18, 1992.

In 1993, the Greater Staples Hospital Foundation was formed. Sally Gorton was the Director. The first fundraising events included a golf scramble, pedal bike rally and dinner auction.

In 1996, Greater Staples Hospital and Care Center merged with Lakewood Clinic to become Lakewood Health System. Curt Bach, Lakewood Clinic administrator became a dual-president with Tim Rice. Later that year, Curt Bach resigned and Rice became the sole administrator.

Lakewood Health System expanded its clinic services in 1998 to the Motley area. Lakewood's third satellite clinic was opened in Motley on Sunday, June 7, 1998. Other clinics include Eagle Bend and Browerville.

In May, 2000, CentraCare Clinic of Saint Cloud collaborated with Lakewood to build a 10-unit dialysis unit attached to the Lakewood Clinic in Staples. A renovation coincided to add additional exam rooms. In the same month, Lakewood Health System purchased Pine Lawn Estates and renamed the building to Lakewood Pines; independent living apartments with add-on healthcare services. In July, the fetal alcohol spectrum disorder (FASD) diagnostic clinics were added through a grant awarded by the Minnesota Department of Children, Families and Learning. This project was in collaboration with Freshwater Education District, located also in Staples.

The Mary Rohndorf Home was revisited in 2005 when Lakewood Health System purchased the estate and established what is now called Lakewood Manor, a full-service assisted living facility.

In 2010, Lakewood Health System has 12 family medicine physicians, 10 mid-level providers and nine on-staff specialists including oncology, surgery, podiatry, OB/GYN, psychiatry, psychology, rheumatology and anesthesiology.

Lakewood Clinic

Lakewood Clinic was built in Staples in 1969. It grew to have two satellite clinics, one in Eagle Bend and one in Browerville before merging with Greater Staples Hospital and Greater Staples Care Center to become Lakewood Health System.

== Administration history ==
Miss Dorothy E. Smith was the first administrator of the Staples Municipal Hospital and served April 12-July 1, 1937. She Left due to her mother's illness and Miss Cora L. Anderson succeeded her. Mrs. Bernice Burdette served as hospital administration from 1960 to 1970 and transferred the reigns to Gary Kenner who served from 1970 to 1980. Tim Rice was the hospital administrator until 2023. Lisa Bjerga is the current President & CEO.

== Important issues and advancements ==
On Tuesday, Feb 20, 1973, the United District Hospital voted unanimously to adopt the recommendation of the Staples Ministerial Association on the topic of abortion. In the current day, Lakewood Health System continues to uphold the decision to reject abortion unless in the most extreme conditions.

Home Health Care was added in November, 1982, the first mammography machine was purchased in February, 1984 and Hospice care was added March, 1985.

The Greater Staples Hospital and Greater Staples Care Center went smoke-free on January 1, 1990, to provide a healthy workplace to employees, patients and visitors. To date, Lakewood Health System is a tobacco-free campus and all use of tobacco is prohibited on Lakewood Health System grounds.

The first laparoscopic surgery was performed when Lakewood Health System was the United District Hospital. The surgery was a gallbladder removal and was performed by Dr. Dan Smith and assisted by Dr. William Mennis on Friday, December 20, 1992. The first in-house CAT scanner purchased in 1992 and in 1999, a new CT scanner was purchased for better image quality.

The Rural Physician Associate Program (RPAP) began at Lakewood Clinic in 1992 with Julie Mayers as the student. Dr. Julie Mayers Benson began practicing at Lakewood in 1997.

== Awards ==
- 2010 - recipient of the MHA Innovation of the Year in Patient Care – Small Hospitals Category
- 2010 - recipient of the Psychologically Healthy Workplace Award by the Minnesota Psychological Association
- 2009 – recipient of the Minnesota Department of Health Rural Health Hero Award (Tim Rice)
- 2008 - recipient of the Minnesota Hospital Association SAFE initiatives award
- 2008 – recipient of the nationally recognized HealthLeaders Media Top Leadership Team Award (small hospital category)
- 2007 – recipient of the Minnesota Hospital Association award for Health-Care Career Promotion (small hospital category)
- 2005 – recipient of the CentraCare Spirit of Caring Award
- 2005 – Lakewood Health System employee, Helen Kimball, was the recipient of the Minnesota Hospital Association Caregiver of the Year award
- 2002 – recipient of the Minnesota Department of Health Rural Health Hero Award (Mel Nefstead)
- 2002 – recipient of the Minnesota Hospital Association Best Minnesota Hospital Workplace
