= SMDC (disambiguation) =

SMDC refers to the United States Army Space and Missile Defense Command.

SMDC may also refer to:

- St. Mary's/Duluth Clinic Health System in Duluth, Minnesota
- Saskatchewan Mining Development Corporation, a former provincial crown corporation in Saskatchewan, Canada
- SM Development Corporation, a subsidiary of Philippine company SM Investments
- Sunshine Maritime Development Corporation, owner of the oil tanker involved in the 2006 Guimaras oil spill
- Shalamar Medical and Dental College, Lahore, Pakistan
- Sharif Medical and Dental College, Lahore, Pakistan
