= St. Francis Regional Medical Center (Minnesota) =

- Allina Health HealthPartners Park Nicollet Essentia Health

Geography
- Location: Shakopee, Minnesota, United States
- Coordinates: 44.77172°N 93.50293°W

Organization
- Type: Regional

Services
- Emergency department: 21 rooms
- Beds: 89 private rooms

Helipads
- Helipad: yes

History
- Opened: 1938

Links
- Lists: Hospitals in Minnesota

St. Francis Regional Medical Center is a not-for-profit regional medical center located on the southwestern edge of the Twin Cities metropolitan area in Shakopee, Minnesota. St. Francis was founded by a small group of Franciscan Sisters in 1938 and is currently owned by Allina Health, HealthPartners Park Nicollet and Essentia Health.

== Hospital rating data ==
The HealthGrades website contains the latest quality data for St. Francis Regional Medical Center, as of 2016. For this rating section three different types of data from HealthGrades are presented: quality ratings for eighteen inpatient conditions and procedures, twelve patient safety indicators and the percentage of patients giving the hospital a 9 or 10 (the two highest possible ratings).

For inpatient conditions and procedures, there are three possible ratings: worse than expected, as expected, better than expected. For this hospital the data for this category is:

- Worse than expected - 0
- As expected - 15
- Better than expected - 3

For patient safety indicators, there are the same three possible ratings. For this hospital safety indicators were rated as:

- Worse than expected - 1
- As expected - 11
- Better than expected - 0

Percentage of patients rating this hospital as a 9 or 10 - 78% Percentage of patients who on average rank hospitals as a 9 or 10 - 69%

== See also ==
- List of hospitals in Minnesota
