= Maple Grove Hospital =

- North Memorial and M Health Fairview

Geography
- Location: Maple Grove, Hennepin County, Minnesota, United States
- Coordinates: 45.133565°N 93.479265°W

Organization
- Funding: non-profit
- Type: Short term acute care

Services
- Beds: 130

History
- Opened: 2009

Links
- Website: www.maplegrovehospital.org
- Lists: Hospitals in Minnesota

Maple Grove Hospital is a short-term acute care hospital located in Maple Grove, Minnesota. It is one of two emergency care facilities in Maple Grove. The other facility is Park Nicollet Urgent Care.

== History ==
The hospital took some time to get approved because of controversy and the need for legislative approval. However, it was approved to be built by 2006. It opened in 2009.

On December 31, 2019, the hospital celebrated its 10 year anniversary.

The owners of the hospital, North Memorial Health, as of September 2021, are planning to expand the hospital.
