= Mayo Clinic Health System =

American hospital network

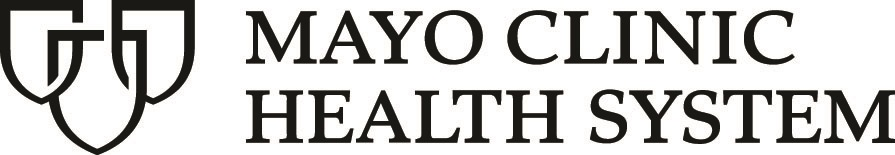
- Type: Nonprofit Health Care Provider
- Industry: Health Care
- Founded: 1992
- Headquarters: United States
- Key people: Prathibha Varkey (President)
- Number of employees: 15,420 (2019)
- Parent: Mayo Clinic
- Divisions: Northwest Wisconsin, Southwest Wisconsin, Southeast Minnesota, Southwest Minnesota
- Website: mayoclinichealthsystem.org

Mayo Clinic Health System is a system of community-based medical facilities. It is owned by Mayo Clinic and was founded in 1992. The organization focuses on providing medical care in rural communities in Minnesota, Iowa, and Wisconsin. As of 2022, its facilities include 16 hospitals, 53 multispecialty clinics and one mobile health clinic. The president of Mayo Clinic Health System is Prathibha Varkey (since August 2021).

== History ==
In the early 1990s, Mayo Clinic formed a system of clinics and hospitals in response to the growth of managed care. The organization was initially called Mayo Health System when it was founded in 1992. The first groups to join were the Decorah Clinic in Decorah, Iowa, followed by Wisconsin-based Midelfort Clinic and Luther Hospital. Joining Mayo Health System allowed the facilities to offer services previously unavailable in the area, such as adding a cardiovascular surgery center to Luther Hospital. By 1995, the health system had 11 clinics and hospitals. That year, the Skemp clinic and St. Francis Hospital in La Crosse, Wisconsin, joined Mayo Health System as Franciscan Skemp health care.

By 1999, the health system had affiliates in 55 communities. In 2011, the organization changed its name and the name of its affiliates to Mayo Clinic Health System. By 2012, the health system had 70 locations and reported seeing 500,000 patients annually.

Prathibha Varkey was named president of Mayo Clinic Health System in 2021; she succeeded Bobbie Gostout. Varkey was the first woman of color to lead the organization.

During the COVID-19 pandemic, the organization saw telehealth appointments increase from 4 percent of all appointments to 85 percent. By May 2021, the organization said telehealth appointments had lowered to 20 percent.

Mayo Clinic Health System opened its first mobile clinic in June 2021 in Southern Minnesota, as a way to provide care in rural locations where permanent clinics were not financially viable. The organization used a 39-foot commercial vehicle for the clinic, which includes two exam rooms as well as a laboratory. The clinic is also equipped with wireless internet, so patients in areas with limited internet access can use the facility to attend telemedicine appointments. By February 2022, the mobile clinic had seen 1,000 people.

Also in 2021, the health system introduced a program called Mayo Clinic Advanced Care at Home, which allows some surgery patients to spend more of their recovery at home. The program includes setting up remote monitoring equipment that allows medical staff to monitor the patient's condition. Nurses and paramedics who are available in case of emergency also visit the patients to administer medicine. The program was created in part to free up bed space amid the COVID-19 pandemic, but the organization said it expected to continue offering at-home recovery beyond the pandemic.

In January 2022, 700 members of the organization's nursing staff signed a petition demanding that it address staff shortages and increase compensation for nurses. In its response, the organization noted that like other hospitals and clinics, it was experiencing challenges maintaining staffing levels due to the pandemic. The organization requested assistance from the Wisconsin National Guard in late 2021. In early 2022, soldiers were deployed to fulfill the work of nursing and patient care assistants through March 2022.

== Facilities ==
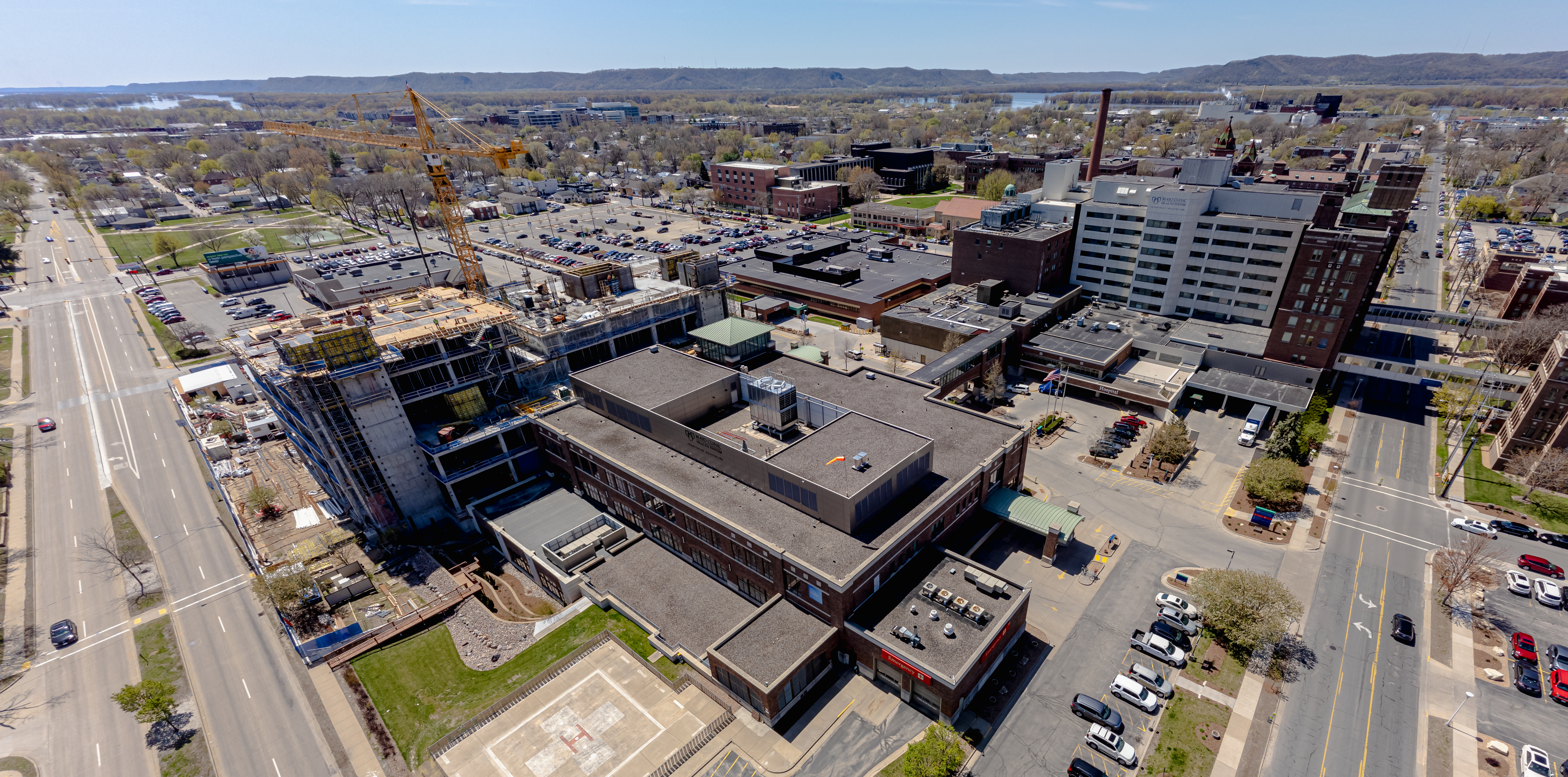
Franciscan Skemp Medical Center Mayo La Crosse

Mayo Clinic Health System consists of hospitals, clinics, and other health care facilities in local communities in Southern Minnesota, Western Wisconsin, and Northeastern Iowa. The organization is divided into four operational regions: Northwest Wisconsin, Southwest Wisconsin, Southeast Minnesota, and Southwest Minnesota. Medical providers and patients have access to specialized care and expertise available at Mayo Clinic in Rochester. As of December 2021, Mayo Clinic Health System facilities served 600,000 patients across its operating regions.

After combining its Albert Lea and Austin hospitals into a single entity with two campuses in 2013, Mayo Clinic Health System announced in 2017 that it would consolidate inpatient services to the Austin campus. Initially, some residents in the area expressed concern that they would lose access to some services. The organization said that the integration would help it sustain services, and that both facilities would retain most services such as outpatient and emergency care. In June 2021, the health system finished construction on new medical and surgical inpatient units, as well as a new birth center and intensive care unit at the Austin facility. At the Albert Lea location, work included renovations to its cancer treatment center and inpatient psychiatric care, and a hyperbaric chamber.

In December 2019, the organization announced it would close a hospital, several clinics and an emergency room in Springfield, Minnesota, and clinics in Lamberton, Minnesota, due to a lack of patients and staff, which led to negative operating margins.

Mayo Clinic Health System announced it had received approval to begin work on a 121 bed expansion of the Mankato Hospital, Minnesota in February 2022. In addition to the added bed space, the expansion includes an additional surgical unit, as well as new units for progressive and intensive care, and upgrades to staff workspaces. In April of the same year, the organization began work on USD$15 million worth of renovations and upgrades to its Albert Lea, Minnesota, hospital, including remodeling and modernizing several departments. That month, the organization also broke ground on a new 70-bed hospital in La Crosse.

As of 2022, the health system had 16 hospitals, 53 multispecialty clinics, and one mobile health clinic. Southeast Minnesota has a Physician and Management Services Agreement with Winneshiek Medical Center in Decorah.

=== Minnesota regions ===
The Southeast Minnesota regional hub is Rochester. Southwest Minnesota's hub is Mankato. The health system's Iowa facilities are part of the Southeast Minnesota region. As of March 2022, the organization's Southwest and Southeast Minnesota regions operated nine hospitals and 30 clinics in the following communities (parentheses indicate multiple locations):

- Adams
- Albert Lea (2)
- Austin (2)
- Belle Plaine
- Cannon Falls
- Decorah, IA
- Ellsworth, WI
- Fairmont
- Faribault
- Janesville
- Lake City
- Lake Mills, IA
- Le Sueur
- Mankato (4)
- Montgomery
- New Prague
- New Richland
- Owatonna
- Plainview
- Red Wing
- St. James
- St. Peter
- Waseca
- Waterville
- Wells
- Zumbrota

=== Wisconsin regions ===
The health system's Southwest Wisconsin regional hub is La Crosse, the Northwest Wisconsin hub is Eau Claire. As of March 2022, the organization's Northwest and Southwest Wisconsin regions operated 7 hospitals and 23 clinics in the following communities (parentheses indicate multiple locations):

- Arcadia
- Barron
- Bloomer
- Caledonia, MN
- Chetek
- Chippewa Falls
- Eau Claire - Luther Campus and Clairemont Campus
- Glenwood City
- Holmen
- La Crosse (4)
- Menomonie
- Mondovi
- Onalaska
- Osseo
- Prairie du Chien
- Rice Lake
- Sparta (2)
- Tomah

== Research and education ==
Mayo Clinic Health System has research partnerships with University of Wisconsin's UW-La Crosse and UW-Eau Claire campuses. The groups have collaborated on cancer research, and in 2020 worked together developing COVID-19 tests.

The organization also partners with UW-Eau Claire to host an annual research symposium for college and high school students to present original theories on medical topics. The symposium winners are given the opportunity to work with Mayo Clinic Health System's labs to develop their ideas.

In 2022, the health system and UW-Eau Claire received a $9.4 million grant under the American Rescue Plan Act. The grant would be used to increase health care workers rural communities, improve nursing education and clinical training opportunities by incentivizing teaching in rural communities, and train medical assistants.

The organization announced in March 2022 that it will build an $11 million diagnostic imaging and sports medicine center in UW-Eau Claire's County Material Complex, also known as the Sonnentag Complex. Mayo Clinic Health System is the sports medicine provider for the university's athletics program and signed a research agreement in 2017 that allows students to work with the health system's staff.

Physicians at the organization's hospital in La Crosse were part of a 2022 study on use of artificial intelligence (AI) to detect cancer. The study found that using AI led to fewer missed polyps when performing colonoscopies.

== Community involvement ==
Mayo Clinic Health System provides support to the community through various grant and scholarship funds. Through its Hometown Health Grant Program, established in 2015, it awards funds to non-profit organizations addressing mental health, obesity, substance abuse, food insecurity, diversity and inclusion. The program gave more than $110,000 to organizations in the Mankato area in 2021. In September 2021, the organization announced a $50,000 scholarship fund for students at Viterbo University to increase diversity in healthcare and nursing. In December that year, the organization awarded $500,000 in grants through its Season of Gratitude Awards to 80 organizations addressing health issues and disparities in the communities where the organization operates.

The health system has also partnered with the Salvation Army, providing funds to make mental health support available at homeless shelters in La Crosse; and its staff can contribute to Mayo Clinic's EverybodyIN Fund for Change, which supports efforts in diversity, inclusion, and equity.

== Recognition ==
Mayo Clinic Health System's Eau Claire hospital was ranked number 6 in the state of Wisconsin in 2020, and 4th in 2021 by U.S. News & World Report. In 2021 and 2022, the health system's Albert Lea-Austin hospital, and La Crosse hospital were included in Newsweek's list of top U.S. hospitals.

In the 2021 Bernard A. Birnbaum, M.D., Quality and Affordability Study conducted by Vizient, Inc., the Mayo Clinic Health System Albert Lea-Austin hospital, and hospitals in Fairmont and Red Wing, Minnesota ranked in the top 25 community hospitals; its hospitals in Eau Claire, La Crosse, and Mankato were ranked in the top 25 complex care medical centers.

The American College of Surgeons included the health system's hospitals in Eau Claire and La Crosse in its 2021 list of hospitals recognized for their quality of surgical care.

The Leapfrog Group, a patient safety organization, gave the organization's hospitals in Red Wing, Eau Claire, and La Crosse an "A" grade, and hospitals in Austin and Mankato a "B" grade in 2021. In 2022, the same hospitals all received "A" grades.

== See also ==
- Mayo Clinic
- Mayo Clinic Arizona
- Mayo Clinic Hospital (Rochester), Saint Marys Campus, Methodist Campus
- Mayo Clinic Florida
- Mayo Clinic College of Medicine and Science
- Mayo Clinic Cancer Center
