= Glencoe Regional Health Services =

Health system in Glencoe, Minnesota, U.S.

Glencoe Regional Health Main Campus
- Glencoe Regional Health

Geography
- Location: 1805 Hennepin Avenue, North; Glencoe, McLeod County, Minnesota, United States
- Coordinates: 44.778377°N 94.152270°W

Organization
- Care system: Nonprofit

Services
- Emergency department: Level III trauma center
- Beds: 49 licensed

History
- Opened: 1941

Links
- Website: grhsonline.org
- Lists: Hospitals in Minnesota

Glencoe Regional Health (GRH) is an independent, not-for-profit health system based in Glencoe, Minnesota that was founded in 1941. The main campus includes a primary care clinic, 25-bed critical access hospital, urgent care center and Level III Trauma Center emergency department.

== Locations ==
Glencoe Regional Health operates these facilities:

- Primary-care clinic in Glencoe, Minnesota
- Primary-care clinic in Lester Prairie, Minnesota
- Primary-care clinic in Stewart, Minnesota.
- A 108-bed nursing home, GlenFields Living with Care, on the main campus in Glencoe
- A 40-unit independent senior housing complex, Orchard Estates, on the main campus in Glencoe
