= Children's Minnesota =

Children's hospital system

- Children's Minnesota Minneapolis location

Geography
- Location: Children's Minnesota Hospital, 2525 Chicago Ave, Minneapolis, Minnesota, U.S. Children's Minnesota Hospital, 345 Smith Ave N, Saint Paul, Minnesota, U.S., Minnesota, United States

Organization
- Type: Children's general and specialist

Services
- Emergency department: Level 1 Pediatric Trauma Center
- Beds: 443

Helipads
- Helipad: FAA LID: 25MY

History
- Founded: 1924

Links
- Website: childrensmn.org
- Lists: Hospitals in Minnesota

Children's Minnesota is an American nationally ranked non-profit, acute care children's hospital system located in Minneapolis and Saint Paul, Minnesota, United States. The hospital has 443 pediatric beds between their campuses. Children's Minnesota provides comprehensive pediatric specialties and subspecialties to infants, children, teens, and young adults aged 0–21 throughout Minnesota and surrounding regions and sometimes also treats adults that require pediatric care. Children's Minnesota Minneapolis features an American College of Surgeons verified Level 1 Pediatric Trauma Center, 1 of 4 in the state. In addition to its two hospitals, Children's Minnesota has 12 primary and specialty care clinics, and six rehabilitation sites representing more than 60 pediatric specialties.

== About ==
Children's Minnesota is the only independent health system in Minnesota to provide care exclusively to children, from before birth through young adulthood. In 2018, Children's Minnesota served a total of 135,750 patients, providing 25,761 surgical procedures, 91,495 emergency department visits and 467,118 outpatient clinic visits.

In July 2025, Dr. Emily Chapman, previously the health system’s chief medical officer, was named president and chief executive officer. She is the first female CEO in the organization’s 100-year history. Dr. Marc Gorelick served as president and chief executive officer at from December 2017 until 2025.

Children's has a full range of pediatric specialty services, critical care, and clinics to serve premature infants through older teens. While Children's serves thousands of the region's sick children each year, the organization also strives to keep children well and to prevent illness and injury. Children's Minnesota also includes Children's – Woodbury, specialty and rehabilitation clinics in Woodbury; Children's – Roseville, a rehabilitation clinic in Roseville; and Children's – Minnetonka, an outpatient surgery, diagnostic center, and rehabilitation clinic in Minnetonka.

=== Awards and rankings ===
In December 2018, Children's Minnesota attained Level I Children's Surgery Center verification by the American College of Surgeons. Children's Minnesota is the first and only hospital in Minnesota to earn this distinction of meeting national quality and safety standards for children's surgery.

Children's Minnesota attained Magnet® recognition for nursing excellence from the American Nurses Credentialing Center (ANCC), becoming the only free-standing pediatric system in the state to be recognized by the ANCC with Magnet® designation. Considered the gold standard, Magnet recognizes quality patient care, nursing excellence and innovations in professional nursing practice. At the time of Children's announcement in March, 2018, only 8 percent of hospitals nationally had earned this designation, including only three other health systems in Minnesota.

== See also ==
- Gillette Children's Specialty Healthcare, St. Paul, Minnesota
- M Health Fairview University of Minnesota Masonic Children's Hospital
