= Phillips Eye Institute =

- Allina Health

Geography
- Location: Minneapolis and Buffalo, Minnesota, United States
- Coordinates: 44°57′19.5″N 93°15′39.7″W

Organization
- Type: Specialist

Services
- Speciality: Eyes

Links
- Website: www.allinahealth.org/phillips-eye-institute
- Lists: Hospitals in Minnesota

Phillips Eye Institute consists of two specialty eye hospitals in Minnesota, United States. Phillips Eye Institute's location, in Minneapolis, Minnesota opened in 1987. Phillip's newest location, in Buffalo, Minnesota opened in 2008. Phillips Eye Institute specializes in the diagnosis, treatment and care of eye disorders and diseases. Phillips Eye Institute is part of the Allina Health System.

On March 1, 2022 the institute vacated their main building, moving operations to the nearby Abbott-Northwestern Hospital building.
