= Wheeling Hospital =

Coordinates: 40°03′31.5″N 80°41′03.8″W

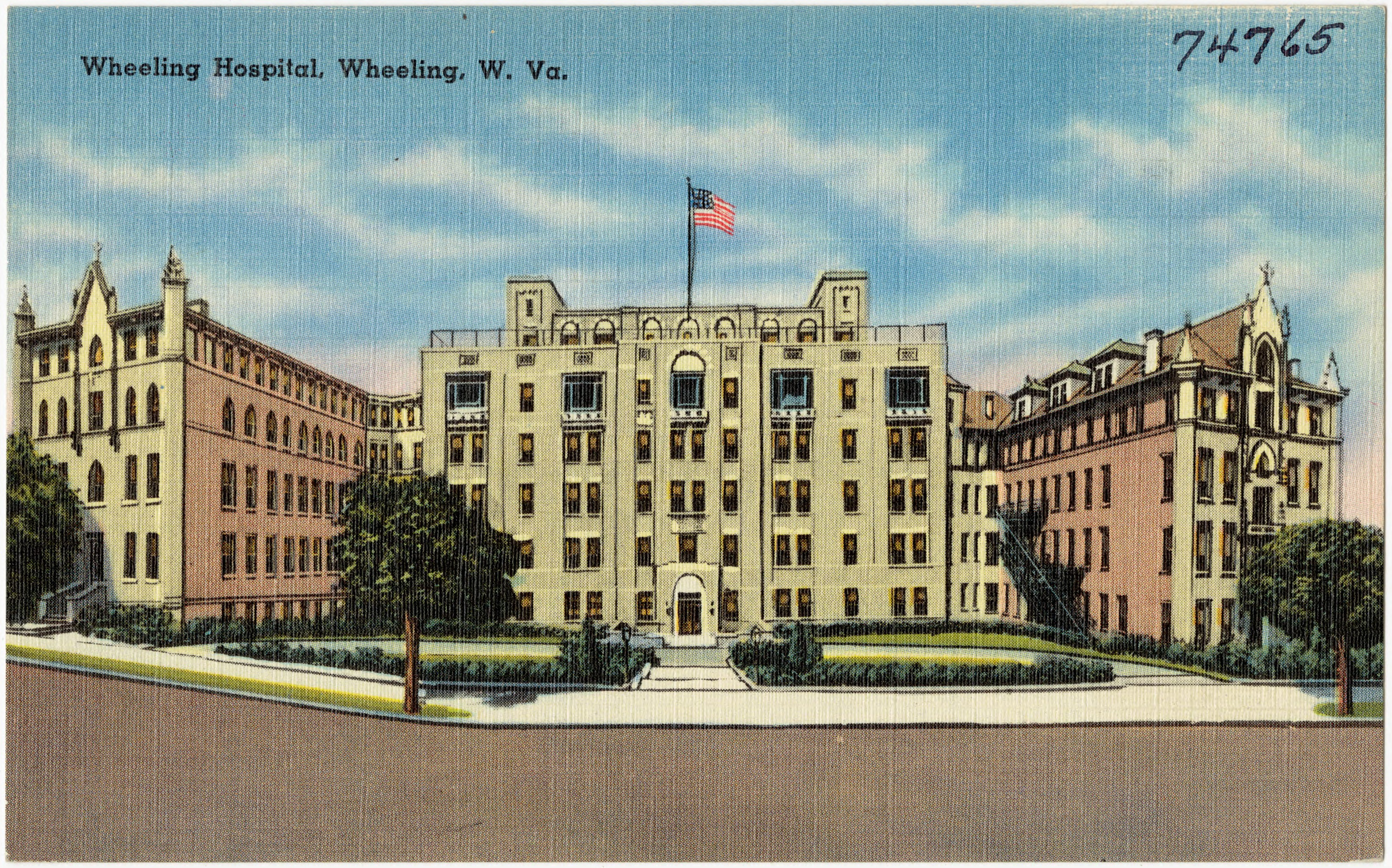
- Original Wheeling Hospital

Geography
- Location: Wheeling, West Virginia, United States

Services
- Emergency department: Level III trauma center
- Beds: 223 licensed beds

History
- Opened: 1850

Links
- Website: www.wheelinghospital.org
- Lists: Hospitals in West Virginia

Wheeling Hospital is a 223 bed hospital in Wheeling, West Virginia. Originally founded in 1850, it is one of the oldest hospitals in the United States in continuous operation as an institution. It was founded by visitation nuns and later became affiliated with the convent of the Sisters of St. Joseph. During the Civil War, the hospital was used by the military.

In the 1980s, a new hospital complex was built in the Clator neighborhood of Wheeling, and the original hospital in North Wheeling was demolished in the 1990s.

== History ==
Like many hospitals in the United States, Wheeling Hospital encountered financial difficulties in the 1990s and 2000s decade. In 2005, Michael Bransfield became Bishop of the Roman Catholic Diocese of Wheeling–Charleston and became Chairman of the Board of the hospital. During Bransfield's tenure, new consultants were hired that greatly improved the hospital's finances, largely via a strategy of aggressively seeking out more reimbursement from Medicare and Medicaid. These fees would eventually lead to a Justice Department lawsuit against the hospital for improperly billing the federal government for false claims. The matter was ultimately settled in 2020 with the hospital agreeing to pay the government $50 million. This was not the only controversial aspect; in 2015–2018, the hospital transferred much of its then-windfall to the "Bishop's Fund", a charity created and controlled by Bransfield. This was considered unusual and possibly improper, as there are strict restrictions on what can be done with revenue at federally-funded non-profits such as hospitals. Around $21 million was transferred overall; members of the board said in 2019 they had no recollection of authorizing such at a meeting, leaving it unclear how it happened and why staff went along with Bransfield's request. While most of the money in the Bishop's Fund was spent in West Virginia, some of it appears to have been spent on expensive gifts used by Bransfield to win allies out of state, and others on lavish and unwise spending. Bransfield stepped down from his role as Bishop in September 2018 after accusations of fiscal impropriety with the Diocese's money as well as allegations of sexual harassment of seminarians and young priests.

== See also ==
- List of the oldest hospitals in the United States
