= Red Wing Medical Center =

- Mayo Clinic

Geography
- Location: Red Wing, Minnesota, United States
- Coordinates: 44.55988°N 92.57201°W

Services
- Beds: 50

History
- Opened: 1884

Links
- Website: mayoclinichealthsystem.org/locations/red-wing
- Lists: Hospitals in Minnesota

Mayo Clinic Health System in Red Wing (part of Mayo Clinic Health System) is a 50-bed hospital located in Red Wing, Minnesota, United States. Opened in 2001, it combines a clinic and hospital in one facility.

== History ==
The first hospital in Red Wing, Minnesota was established in 1884. Located at southwest Dakota and Levee Streets. The Andrew Koch building served as the first hospital in Red Wing. The house was built by A. Koch in the 1850s.

The current hospital was formed from the merge of River Region Health Services and Interstate Medical Center in 1997.

=== River Region Health Services ===
Red Wing was later served by St. John's Regional Health Center and was organized into River Region Health Services (RRHS) in 1986.

It was determined in a community-wide planning process, initiated in 1985 and was completed in mid-1986, that the city of Red Wing wanted to create a regional health care system. The board leadership of St. John's Regional Health Center, Seminary Memorial Home (representing the nonprofit health care providers) and Interstate Medical Center (representing most area physicians) agreed with the goals of "Red Wing 2000."

An organizational format was created for what was known as River Region Health Services (RRHS). Recommendations to create a new system and to build stronger working relationships with physicians were presented to the boards of St. John's Regional Health Center, Seminary Memorial Home and Interstate Medical Center in September 1986. There was a clear vision that the future trend in health care was toward de-institutionalization––outpatient and home care, and alternative living arrangements. To meet the changing needs, RRHS created two additional subsidiaries in River Region Community Services (RRCS) and River Region Housing Corporation (RRHC).

=== Interstate Medical Center ===
Interstate Medical Center was a professional corporation and its predecessor was the Interstate Clinic. It was founded in a partnership between Edward H. Juers, M.D., and Raymond F. Hedin, M.D., in 1932. In 1940, having additional physicians join the medical staff, their group, now the Interstate Clinic, moved to a new building at Third and Dakota streets. The group incorporated as the Interstate Medical Center, Professional Associates in 1969, and moved to US Highway 61 in 1970. A major expansion of the building occurred in 1980. In 1986, a second building was added at this site.

In 1981, George M.B. Hawley, M.D., became associated with the Interstate Medical Center and the first branch office began operation at 303 West Fifth Street. In 1987, that office expanded and moved to Fourth Street in the Seminary Plaza. The branch office in Ellsworth, Wisconsin was constructed in 1984. In 1986, Robert Thompson, M.D., in Zumbrota, joined Interstate Medical Center. That office expanded in 1987 and moved to 525 Mill Street.

=== Current Hospital and purchase by Mayo Clinic ===
In 1997, Fairview Red Wing Health Services brought together River Region Health Services and Interstate Medical Center as one coordinated system of care. The new Fairview Red Wing Medical Center served the clinic and hospital needs of Red Wing and the surrounding area.

Red Wing Medical Center opened in 2001 on the West side of Red Wing, Minnesota located on Fairview Boulevard, just off Red Wing Avenue S near US Highway 61.

Red Wing Medical Center was purchased by Mayo Clinic in 2012 and was renamed Mayo Clinic Health System in Red Wing.

== Governance ==
Mayo Clinic Health System in Red Wing is part of Mayo Clinic Health System.
