= Franciscan Skemp Medical Center =

Mayo Clinic Health Systems Franciscan Skemp Medical Center
- Mayo Clinic Health System
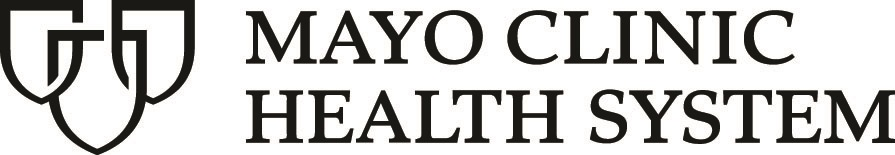

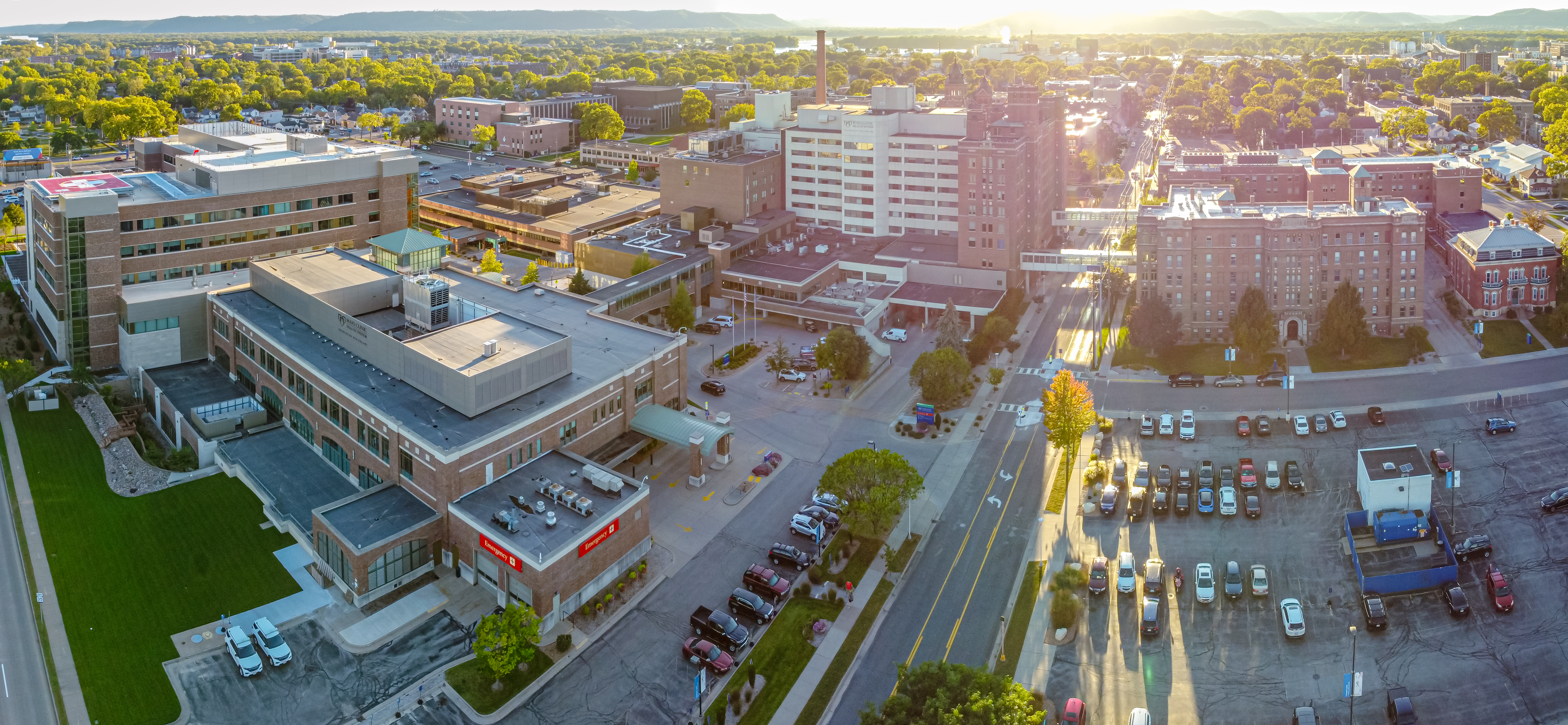

Geography
- Location: La Crosse, Wisconsin, United States
- Coordinates: 43°48′15″N 91°14′30″W

Services
- Emergency department: Yes
- Beds: 96

History
- Former name: Franciscan Skemp Medical Center

Links
- Lists: Hospitals in Wisconsin

Mayo Clinic Health System La Crosse Hospital is one of the two hospitals in La Crosse, Wisconsin. This hospital is part of the Mayo Clinic Health System This hospital has 96 acute care beds, a labor and delivery unit, an emergency department and an Intensive Care Unit.

This hospital serves as the regional referral center for the Southwest Wisconsin region of the Mayo Clinic Health System, which includes La Crosse, Onalaska, WI, Holmen, WI, Prairie du Chien, WI, Sparta, WI, Tomah, WI, Arcadia, WI, and other surrounding communities.

The hospital was first built in 1883 by the Franciscan Sisters of Perpetual Adoration as Saint Francis Hospital. The hospital ultimately merged with the Skemp Clinic, which was itself formed in 1923 by Dr. Archibald Skemp. The joint venture came to be known as Franciscan Skemp Medical Center.

In 1995, Franciscan Skemp Healthcare merged with Mayo Clinic out of Rochester, Minnesota and became known as Mayo Clinic Health System Franciscan -- Franciscan Healthcare.

Starting in 2022, construction commenced on a new 96-bed tower to replace the current bed tower; construction was completed in August 2024 and the inpatient care was transferred to the new tower in September 2024. This will be attached to the Center for Advanced Medicine and Surgery (CAMS) building that houses the emergency department and the operating suites.

== Gallery ==
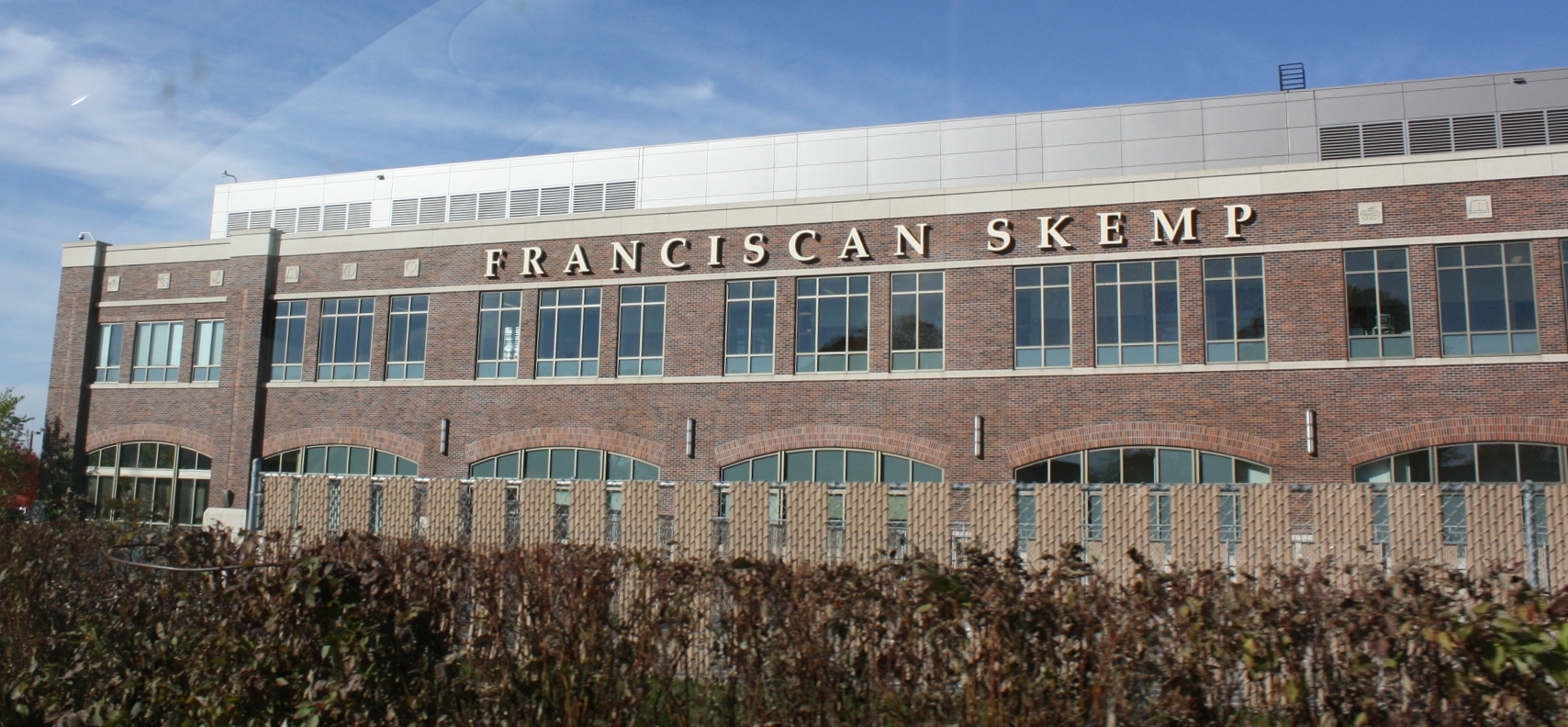
Front

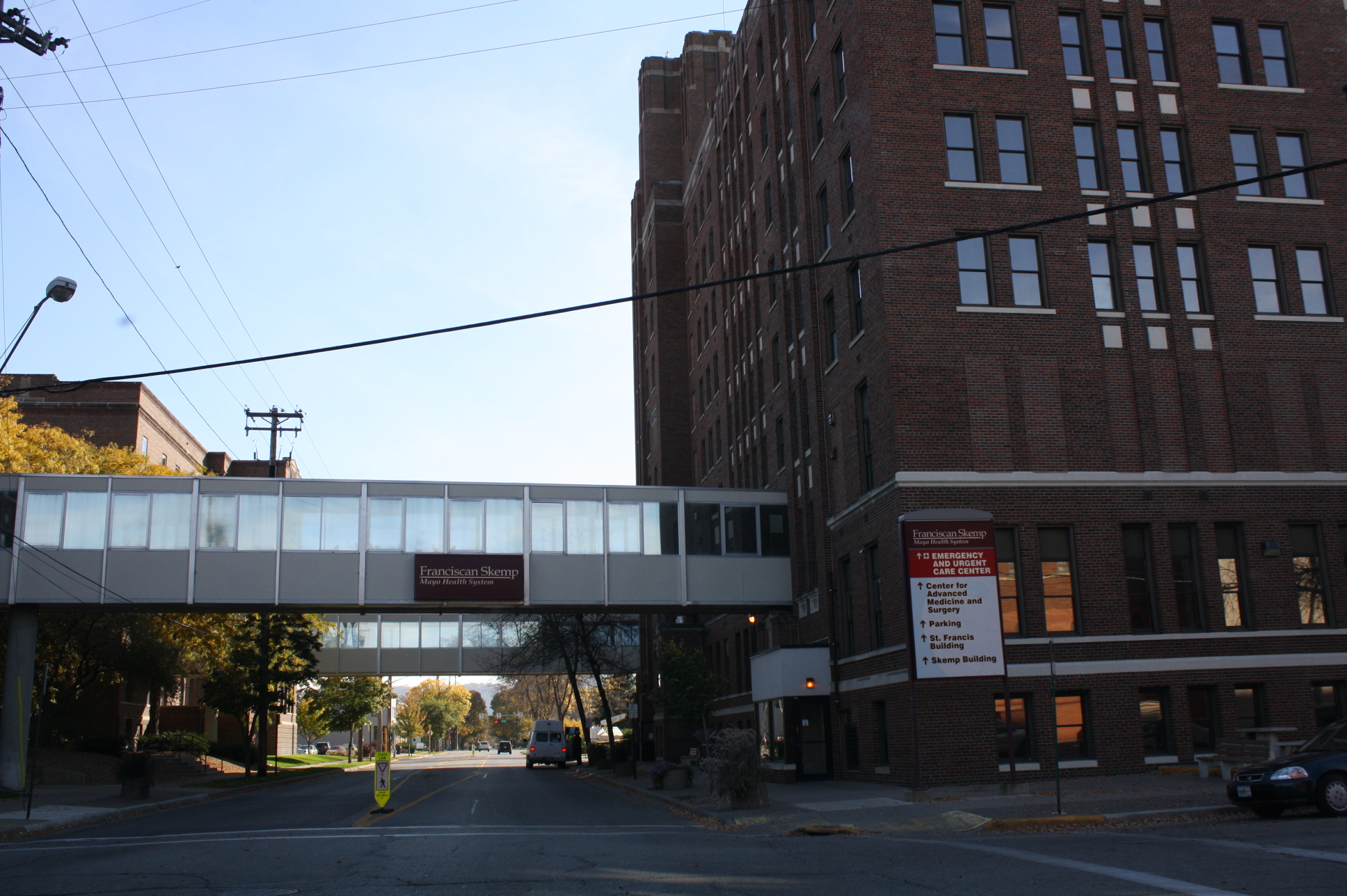
Back

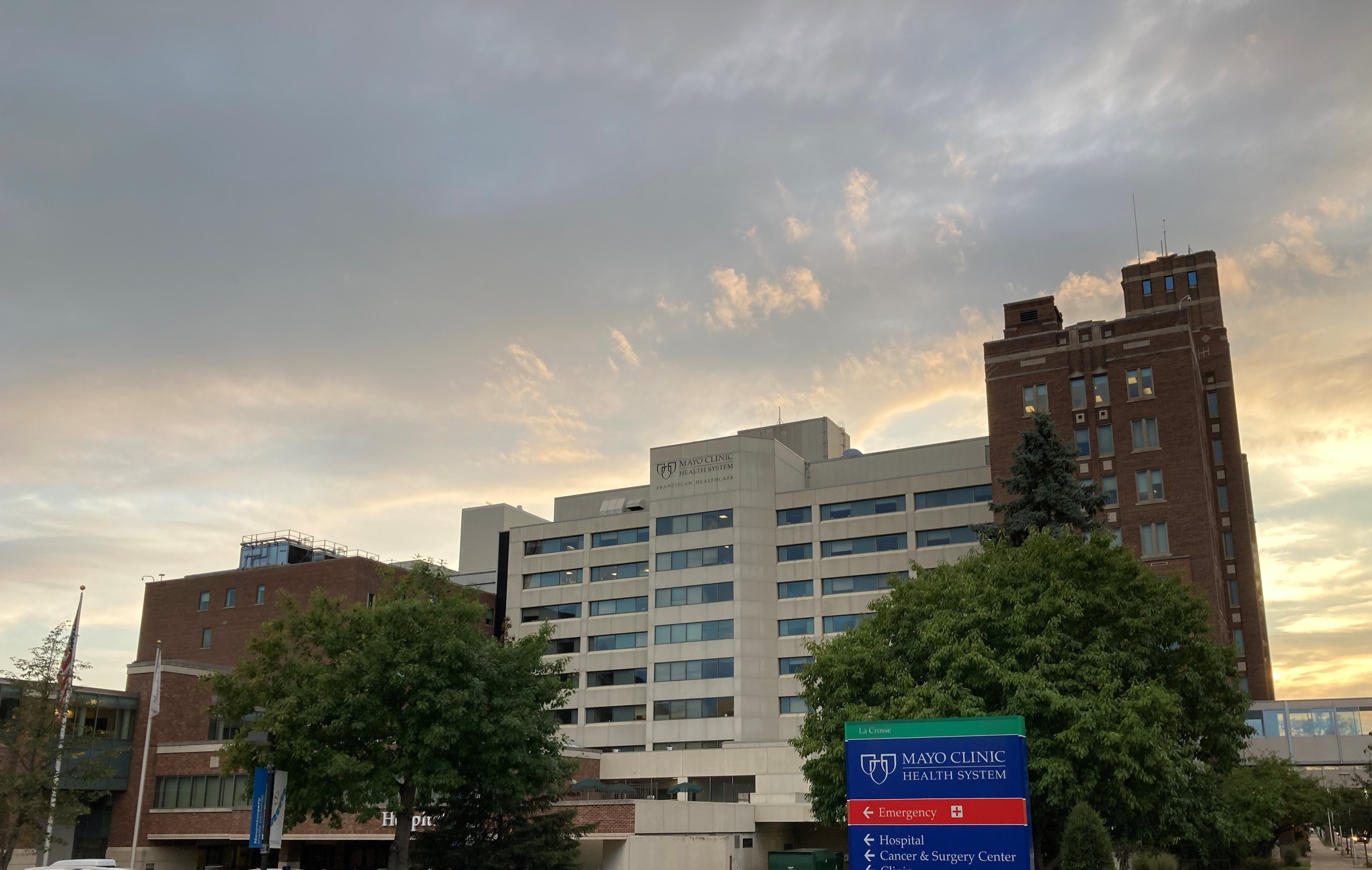
From the East

== See also ==
- Gundersen Health System
