= North Memorial Health Hospital =

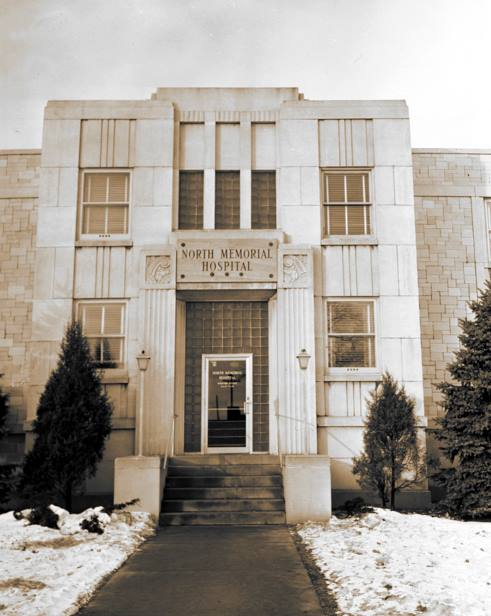
- North Memorial Hospital facade 1955

Geography
- Location: 3300 OAKDALE AVENUE NORTH; Robbinsdale, Minnesota, United States
- Coordinates: 45.017007°N 93.32284°W

Services
- Emergency department: Level I trauma center
- Beds: 353

History
- Founded: 1954

Links
- Website: www.northmemorial.com
- Lists: Hospitals in Minnesota

North Memorial Health Hospital, sometimes referred to as North Memorial, is a 518-bed community hospital located in Robbinsdale, Minnesota. It is one of four Level I trauma centers in Minnesota. It is also a Level II trauma center for pediatrics.

== Foundation ==
In 1939, Dr. Samuel Samuelson started Victory Hospital on property that he already owned in Robbinsdale. It was the only medical center outside of the downtown Minneapolis/St.Paul area. Previously, hospitals in the region had only been located in downtown areas in order to be close to physician's offices. The hospital's name changed from Victory Hospital to North Memorial when it became a private hospital in 1954. In 1957, North Memorial was accredited by the Joint Commission on Accreditation of Hospitals.

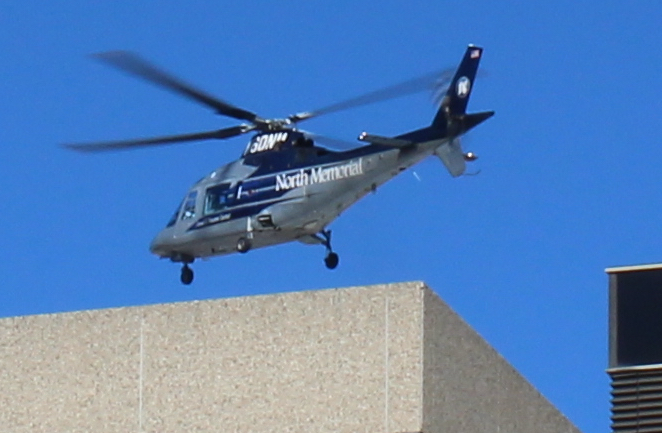
North Memorial AirCare landing at Hennepin County Medical Center in Minneapolis

== Facilities ==
The hospital evolved from a 30-bed facility to a 518-bed medical center. It developed the first hospital-based medical transportation system involving numerous helicopters, ambulances, and support staff. Today, North Memorial Health Hospital is a level one trauma center, accredited with awards. The hospital has specialist centers, ranging from heart attacks to cancer. These specialist care centers vary in location from Twin City suburbs to western Wisconsin.

== Branding ==
North Memorial Health Hospital hired the branding agency Brandfire in 2016 and they rolled out their new name, North Memorial Health, and branding encompassing two hospitals, clinics and specialty practices, in April 2017.
