= HealthPartners =

American integrated nonprofit health care provider

HealthPartners, Inc.
- Type: Health Care Provider and Health Insurance Company
- Industry: Managed Health Care
- Founded: 1957
- Headquarters: Bloomington, Minnesota
- Key people: Andrea Walsh, President & Chief Executive Officer
- Number of employees: 26,000+
- Website: healthpartners.com

HealthPartners is an integrated health care provider and health insurance company located in Bloomington, Minnesota offering care, coverage, research and education to its members, patients and the community.

== History ==
HealthPartners was founded in 1957 as Group Health, a consumer-governed nonprofit health plan with a board of directors made up of its own members and patients. In 1992, Group Health merged with MedCenters Health Plan, and together they formed HealthPartners. On January 1, 2013, HealthPartners merged with Park Nicollet Health Services of St. Louis Park to become the new HealthPartners.

== Leadership ==
Mary Brainerd started with HealthPartners in 1992 and was appointed president & chief executive officer beginning in 2002.

On March 6, 2017, Brainerd announced her retirement effective June 1. Andrea Walsh, former HealthPartners Executive Vice President & Chief Marketing Officer, took over the role of President and CEO on June 1, 2017.

Phil Donaldson is chairman of the board of directors. He was first elected in 2017.

== Organization ==
The group operates as a health care provider, serving 1.8 million medical and dental health plan members nationwide.

HealthPartners says that the cost of medical care for its members is 13% lower than the state average and as much as 4.4% lower than the regional costs.

== Clinics and hospitals ==
HealthPartners family of care includes the HealthPartners Park Nicollet Care Group, a multispecialty group practice of more than 1,700 physicians representing primary care and 55 medical and surgical specialties, serving patients at more than 90 clinic locations and seven hospitals throughout the Twin Cities and Western Wisconsin.

These locations include more than 55 primary care clinics, 23 urgent care clinics, 27 in-clinic pharmacies, 15 eye care centers and 22 dental clinics.

== Workplace Clinics ==
HealthPartners operates on-site health clinics for employees of nine different organizations including: Anoka County, Minneapolis Public Schools, TURCK, Wilson Tool International, and Grede/Bernick's in St. Cloud, Minn. At Wilson Tool, a company with about 500 workers in White Bear Lake, Minnesota, health insurance costs have remained virtually flat for three years, versus double-digit increases before the clinic.

== Virtuwell.com ==
HealthPartners offers virtuwell.com an online clinic with certified medical professionals who can diagnose and treat over 60 health problems, eliminating the need for face-to-face visits for 40% of patients who use the system.

== Awards and recognition ==
U.S. News & World Report/NCQA rated HealthPartners among the top 50 best commercial health plans in the nation for four years in a row (2005–2008).

In 2006, HealthPartners received the American Medical Group Association's national Acclaim Award for excellence in patient care.

Modern Healthcare named HealthPartners one of the best places to work in health care.

HealthPartners is the national benchmark in seven areas in a 2008 report sponsored by the National Business Coalition on Health.

HealthPartners ranks "Highest in Member Satisfaction among Commercial Health Plans in the Minnesota-Wisconsin Region" according to J.D. Power and Associates' 2008 National Health Insurance Plan Study.

== Cultural competence ==
In 2011, HealthPartners Institute for Education and Research implemented the EBAN Experience™ program to reduce health disparities among minority populations, most notably East African immigrants.
