= St. Mary's/Duluth Clinic Health System =

SMDC Health System (St. Mary's/Duluth Clinic Health System) was a hospital network with hospitals and clinics in northeastern Minnesota and northwestern Wisconsin and also serving parts of Michigan's Upper Peninsula. The four hospitals were St. Mary's Medical Center in Duluth, Minnesota, SMDC Medical Center in Duluth, St. Mary's Hospital of Superior, Wisconsin and Pine Medical Center in Sandstone, Minnesota. SMDC included the Duluth Clinic, a group of physicians who provided care at several locations.

In 2004, SMDC merged with Benedictine Health System, and became part of Essentia Health, initially the parent company of the partnership between the Benedictine Health System and SMDC. In 2010, Essentia Health integrated the resources of all of its various member organizations and united them under the one name, Essentia Health, and SMDC Health System ceased to exist.
