= South Georgia Medical Center =

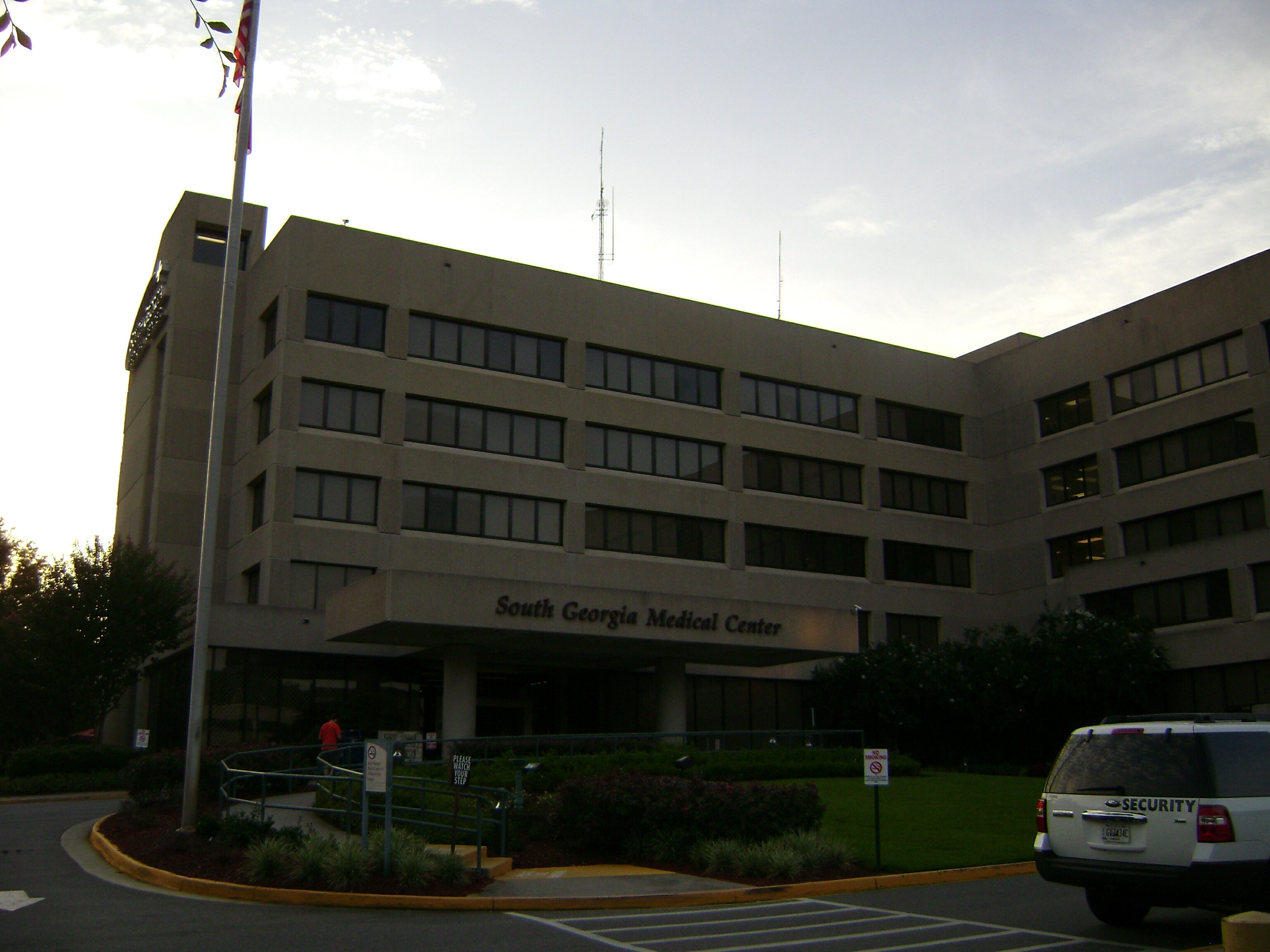
- South Georgia Medical Center

Geography
- Location: North Patterson St, Valdosta, Georgia, United States
- Coordinates: 30.861841°N 83.286185°W

Services
- Beds: 288

History
- Opened: 1955

Links
- Website: www.sgmc.org
- Lists: Hospitals in Georgia

South Georgia Medical Center is one of two hospital providers in Valdosta, Georgia and surrounding Lowndes County, Georgia. The facility opened in 1955 as Pineview General Hospital on Alternate Georgia State Route 7 (N Patterson St) north of downtown Valdosta. The hospital has 285 inpatient beds and is locally operated.
