= Winona Health =

Hospital in Winona, Minnesota, United States

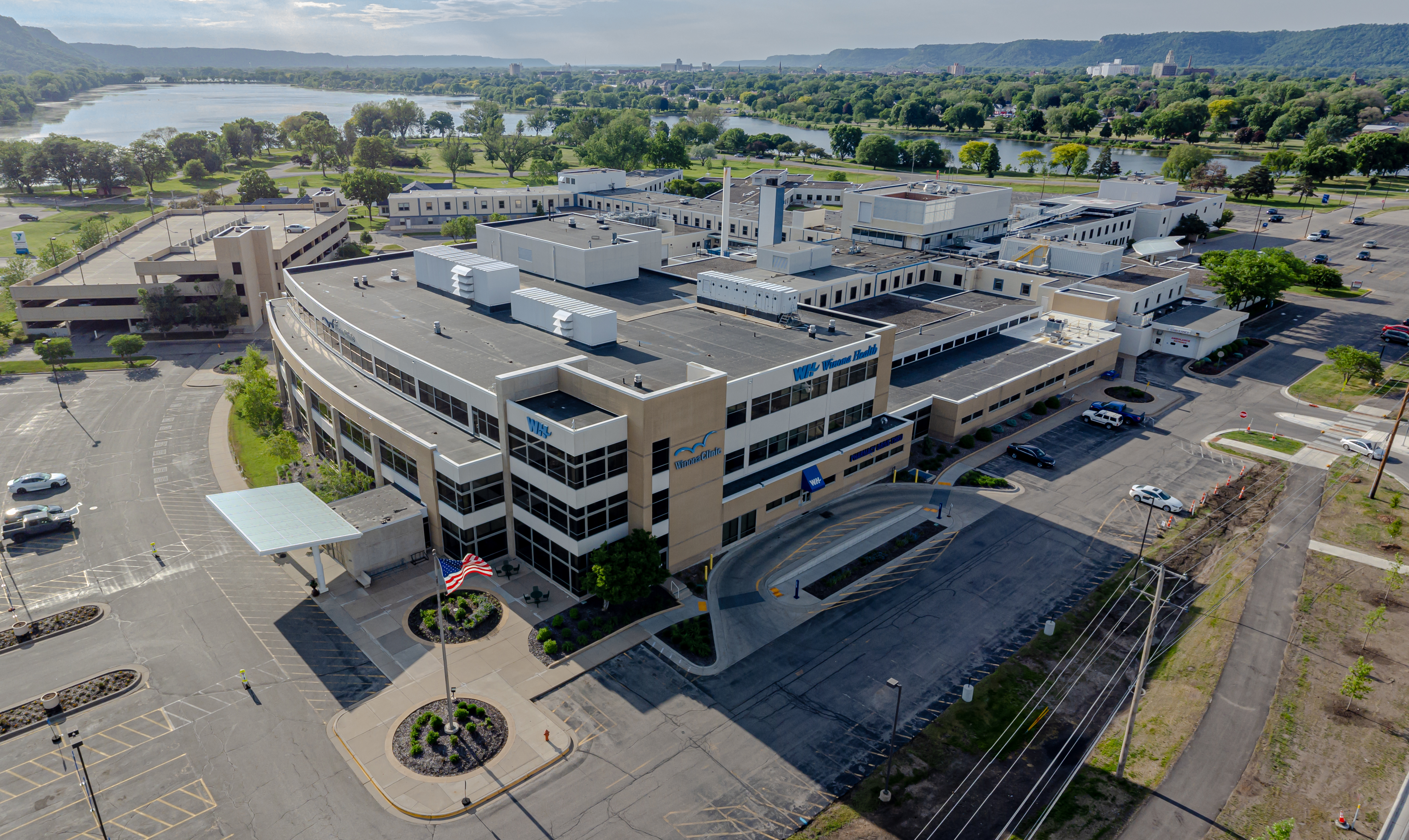

Geography
- Location: 855 Mankato Avenue, Winona, Winona County, Minnesota, United States
- Coordinates: 44°2′0″N 91°37′24″W

Organization
- Type: General
- Affiliated university: Winona State University

Services
- Emergency department: Level IV trauma center
- Beds: 49

History
- Former name: Winona General Hospital
- Constructed: 1894
- Opened: 1894; 132 years ago

Links
- Website: www.winonahealth.org
- Lists: Hospitals in Minnesota

Winona Health is a hospital in Winona County, Minnesota, United States. It is located in the city of Winona and includes a licensed 49-bed acute care hospital. Other facilities of Winona Health in Winona County include a 110-bed long-term care facility, 60-apartment assisted living community, two 10-room memory care living facilities, hospice, homecare, multi-speciality clinic in Winona, physician clinic in Rushford, Minnesota, orthopedic clinic, inpatient and outpatient mental health services, rehabilitative care (physical & occupational therapy, cardiac rehabilitation), inpatient and outpatient surgery, and dialysis.

Winona Health was founded in 1894 when local citizens and physicians raised $4,500 to remodel the former Langley Home into the 18-bed Winona General Hospital. It is one of the largest employers in Winona.

- key people = Rachelle Schultz, EdD, President & Chief Executive Officer
- number of employees = over 1,000 plus over 350 volunteers

== Awards and recognition ==
Winon Health has received the following recognitions:

- One of the Top 100 Rural and Community Hospitals by The Chartis Center for Rural Health in 2017, 2018, 2019, and 2020.
