= Immanuel St. Joseph's =

Mayo Clinic Health System - Mankato
- Mayo Clinic

Geography
- Location: Mankato, Blue Earth County, Minnesota, United States
- Coordinates: 44.16502°N 93.98419°W

Organization
- Type: General

Services
- Beds: 239

History
- Former name: Immanuel-St. Joseph's Hospital
- Opened: 1898 (St. Joseph's Hospital); 1906 (Immanuel Hospital); 1969 (merger); 1996 (affiliation with Mayo)

Links
- Website: mayoclinichealthsystem.org/locations/mankato
- Lists: Hospitals in Minnesota

Mayo Clinic Health System - Mankato, formerly known as Immanuel-St. Joseph's Hospital, is a general medical and surgical hospital in Mankato, Minnesota, United States. It has been a part of Mayo Clinic since 1996. Immanuel-St. Joseph's was formed in 1969 from a merger between two Mankato hospitals, Immanuel Hospital (established 1906) and St. Joseph's Hospital (established 1898). The 239-bed hospital currently employs 3,302 employees, and is one of the largest employers in Mankato. On May 23, 2011, the hospital's name was changed from Immanuel-St. Joseph's Hospital to Mayo Clinic Health System - Mankato.

MCHS-Mankato is a regional hub and the only hospital that provides acute care, primary care, continuous emergency care, a level II nursery, critical care, advanced trauma care, and specialized medicine in Southwestern or South Central Minnesota. MCHS-Mankato is the most capable hospital in all of Southern Minnesota other than the Mayo Clinic in Rochester. MCHS-Mankato is a designated level III trauma center by the American College of Surgeons, the toughest trauma credentialing agency in the world.

Construction was completed in spring of 2024 on a 121-bed expansion that includes a new and expanded Intensive Care Unit, as well as a Progressive Care Unit to care for the most critically ill patients, a new Family Birth Center, including Labor and Delivery, Postpartum and Triage rooms, and cesarean surgical suite and a Level 2 nursery. With the expansion, the hospital has 239 beds, a figure that accounts for about two dozen older beds that will be phased out.

== Services ==
Inpatient services provided include: birthing rooms, adult heart catheterization and diagnostics, hospice, pain management, cancer treatment, and psychiatric emergency services. Outpatient services include: chemotherapy, trauma center, chiropractic treatment, dentistry care, kidney dialysis, physical rehabilitation, substance abuse treatment, and urgent care. Diagnostic equipment available include: CT scanner, a diagnostic radioisotope facility, magnetic resonance imaging, Multislice spiral CT, single photon emission CT, and ultrasound.

== Mayo Clinic Health System Regional Coverage Map ==
Mayo Clinic Health System Regional Coverage Map
