= Essentia Health =

American healthcare system

- Type: Private
- Founded: 2004; 22 years ago
- Headquarters: United States
- Area served: North Dakota, Wisconsin, Minnesota
- Website: www.essentiahealth.org/Main/Home.aspx

Essentia Health is an integrated healthcare system with facilities in Minnesota, Wisconsin, and North Dakota. As of December 2024 it has over 15,600 employees, including 971 physicians, 1,421 advanced practitioners, and 4,876 registered nurses & licensed practical nurses. The network includes 14 hospitals, 79 clinics, six long-term care facilities, six assisted and independent living facilities, and one research & education institute. Essentia Health was accredited as an Accountable Care Organization by the National Committee for Quality Assurance in 2013.

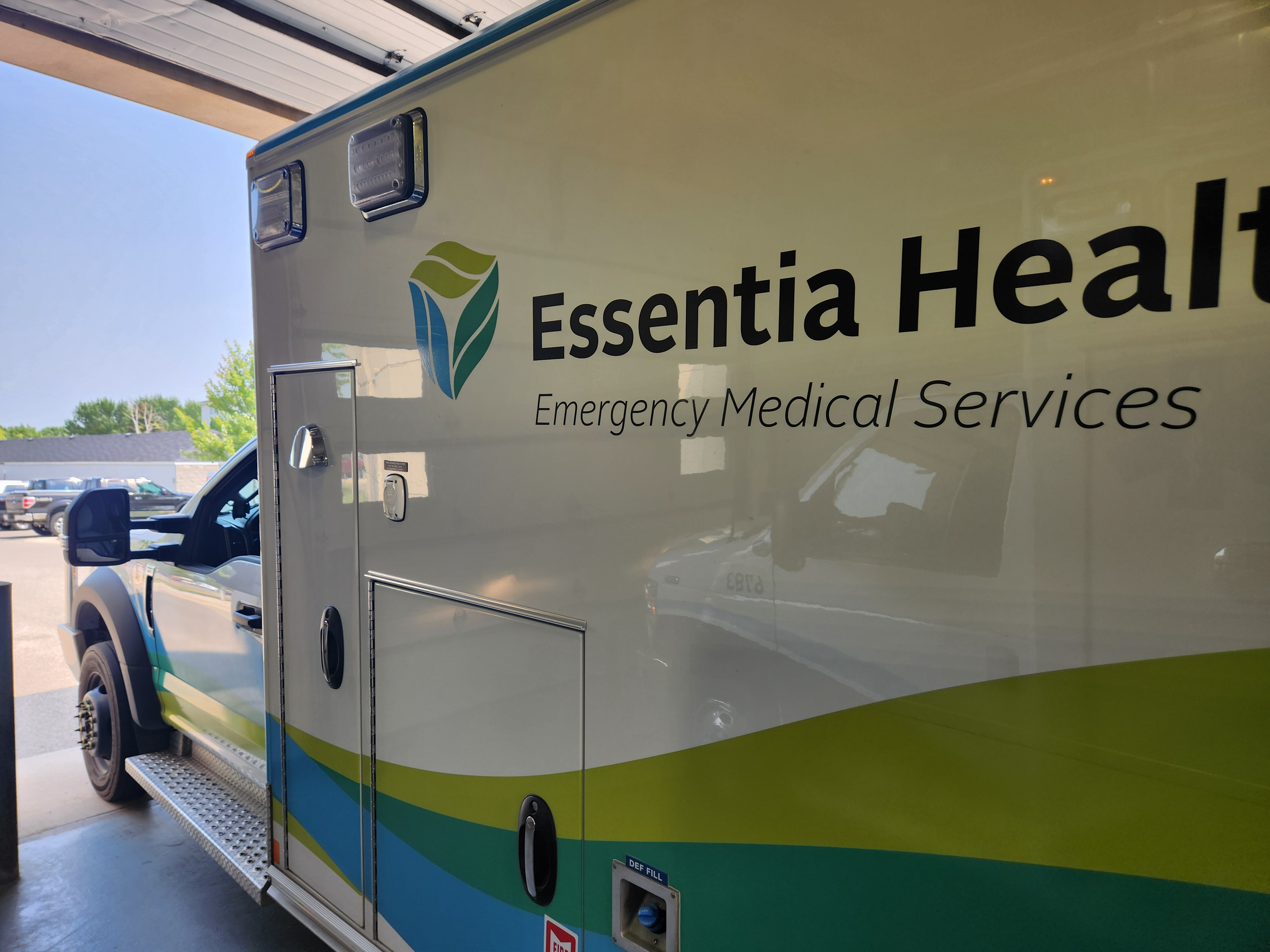
Essentia Health Type 1 Ambulance departing Fargo facility

== History ==
Essentia Health was formed in 2004, as the parent company of the partnership between the Benedictine Health System and St. Mary's/Duluth Clinic Health System (SMDC). Essentia Health acquired Dakota Clinic/Innovis Health in January 2008. In 2010, Essentia Health integrated the resources of all of its member organizations – SMDC Health System, Innovis Health, Brainerd Lakes Health, Essentia Community Hospitals and Clinics, and Essentia Institute of Rural Health – and united them under the one name, Essentia Health.

In 2022, Essentia Health acquired Mid Dakota Clinic. The merger gave Essentia Health four facilities, 25 advanced practitioners, and 280 additional staff members. In October 2022, Essentia Health and Marshfield Clinic Health System announced merger discussions. A Memorandum of Understanding was signed to evaluate how the two organizations might combine to form an integrated regional health system. After almost two years of discussion, the merger was called off in January 2024, although the leaders did not rule out future collaboration attempts.

Essentia Health has more than two dozen Catholic-sponsored clinics, hospitals, and other facilities. The roots of Essentia's Catholic facilities trace back to a group of Benedictine nuns who established St. Mary's Hospital, Essentia Health's oldest hospital, in Duluth in 1888.

== Vision Northland ==
In 2018, Essentia Health announced plans to build a new medical facility that would be replacing the current St. Mary's Medical Center in Duluth. The project was initially set at $800 million, but an additional $100 million was required to add an additional patient floor and outpatient care spaces. Changes in market conditions were also a cause for the increase. The building early 2023, with 98% completed in February. In July 2023, they completed the moving of patients from the old location. The new facility includes 344 patient rooms, 16 operating rooms, and a pneumatic tube system. The 942,000 sq. ft. building includes 500 miles of data cable, high-efficiency plumbing that is 20% more efficient than LEED V4 baseline, and took over 2.8 million union worker labor hours to make it all possible.

== See also ==
- List of hospitals in Minnesota
- List of hospitals in North Dakota
- List of hospitals in Wisconsin
