= CentraCare Health =

CentraCare
- Established: 1995
- Merger of: Carris Health
- Type: Not-for-profit
- Headquarters: St. Cloud, Minnesota
- Region served: Central Minnesota
- Leader: Kenneth Holmen
- Board of directors: CentraCare Board of Directors
- Key people: David Anfinson CPA Bobbie Bertram, APRN CNP Jeff Gau James Hebl, MD Kenneth Holmen, MD Michelle Johnson Father Tom Knoblach Steve Laraway Bryan Rolph, MD Christian Schmidt, MD Bob Thueringer Joe Uphus Richard Wehseler, MD Tim Wensman
- Subsidiaries: Carris Health
- Revenue: $82 million
- Staff: >12,300 (2021)
- Volunteers: >1,500 (2021)
- Website: centracare.com
- Formerly called: CentraCare Health Carris Health

CentraCare is an integrated health care system in Central Minnesota. The nonprofit includes six hospitals, seven senior care facilities, 18 clinics, four pharmacies and numerous inpatient and outpatient specialty care services.

== Major entities ==
=== St. Cloud Hospital ===
Founded in 1886 by the Sisters of the Order of St. Benedict, St. Cloud Hospital is a Catholic, not-for-profit hospital located in St. Cloud, Minnesota. It offers inpatient and outpatient services, including care for heart disease and cancer, preventive health screenings and behavioral health services.

The teaching hospital employs more than 4,900 staff, 450 physicians and 1,000 volunteers. It serves 690,000 people in the surrounding 12-county area and ranks among the 100 TOP Hospitals nationwide according to Truven Health Analytics, a national healthcare rating agency.

=== CentraCare — Long Prairie ===
- Long Prairie Clinic, family medicine
- Long Prairie Hospital, 25 beds
- Long Prairie Care Center, 70 beds, long-term care

CentraCare — Long Prairie serves Todd County, Minnesota and employs more than 250 staff (2014). The Minnesota Department of Health certified CentraCare Clinic — Long Prairie as a designated health care home site through November 2015 and accredited Long Prairie Hospital as an Acute Stroke Ready Hospital. CentraCare — Long Prairie's long-term care facility was also among the 10 percent of Minnesota care centers awarded five stars on the Centers for Medicare and Medicaid Services (CMS) Nursing Home Compare rating system.

=== CentraCare — Melrose ===
- Melrose Clinic, family medicine
- Melrose Hospital, 25-bed critical access hospital with retail pharmacy
- Pine Villa Care Center, 75-bed long-term care facility with Alzheimer's unit
- Park View Center, 61-unit senior apartment building with assisted living services
- CentraCare Radiation Oncology (Alexandria)

This network serves 10,000 residents in and around western Stearns County, Minnesota and employs more than 280 staff. The Diabetes Self-Management Education (DSME) program at CentraCare — Melrose is certified by the American Diabetes Association, and Melrose Clinic is a health care home-certified site through November 2015, per Minnesota Department of Health guidelines.

=== CentraCare — Monticello ===
- Monticello Hospital, 25-bed hospital with Acute Inpatient Rehabilitation and Level IV Trauma Center
- Monticello Care Center, 89-bed long-term care facility
- Monticello Medical Group
- Monticello Cancer Center

=== CentraCare — Sauk Centre ===
- Sauk Centre Clinic, family medicine
- Sauk Centre Hospital, 25-bed critical access hospital
- Sauk Centre Care Center, 60-bed long-term care facility
- Lakeshore Estates, 30-unit independent living senior housing

CentraCare — Sauk Centre serves 10,000 residents in and around western Stearns County, Minnesota and employs more than 230 staff.

=== CentraCare — Paynesville ===
- Family medicine clinics in Cold Spring, Eden Valley, P
- Paynesville and Richmond
- Paynesville Hospital
- Koronis Manor Care Center, long-term care facility
- Stearns Place, retirement apartments
- Washburne Court, assisted living apartments

=== CentraCare Clinic ===
CentraCare Clinic operates more than 30 clinics and several specialty clinics in Central Minnesota and employs about 1,000 staff. CentraCare Clinic includes more than 260 providers who practice 25 medical specialties and offer outreach services in 40 communities. CentraCare eClinic provides an online diagnosis option. Clinic sites include:

- Albany Clinic
- Becker Clinic
- Big Lake Clinic
- Cold Spring Clinic
- Eden Valley Clinic
- Family Health Center, St. Cloud
- Health Plaza Endocrinology, St. Cloud
- Health Plaza Family Medicine, St. Cloud
- Health Plaza Internal Medicine, St. Cloud
- Health Plaza Obstetrics & Women's Health, St. Cloud
- Health Plaza Pediatrics, St. Cloud
- Health Plaza Pediatrics Walk-In Care, St. Cloud
- Little Falls Specialty Clinic
- Long Prairie Clinic
- Melrose Clinic
- Monticello Medical Group
- Northway Family Medicine, St. Cloud
- Paynesville Clinic
- Richmond Clinic
- River Campus, St. Cloud
- Sauk Centre Clinic
- St. Joseph Clinic
- Willmar Skylark Clinic

=== St. Benedict's Senior Community ===
St. Benedict's Senior Community provides nursing services, including short stay and hospice care, as well as services for those with Alzheimer’s disease or other memory-loss conditions. Senior housing offerings include retirement, assisted living and income-based apartments. St. Benedict's has locations in both St. Cloud and Monticello, Minnesota, and care center services include therapeutic recreation, nutrition, rehabilitation services, respite, hospice and spiritual care, social services and a beauty/barber salon.

=== CentraCare Foundation ===
CentraCare Foundation engages the philanthropic community in partnership to improve health and health care. The Foundation accepts charitable contributions for all CentraCare entities. In fiscal year 2014-2015, CentraCare Foundation gave more than $5 million in health care grants throughout Central Minnesota.

=== Carris Health ===
A subsidiary of CentraCare, Carris Health was formed in 2018. In June 2022, Carris Health was renamed to CentraCare.

=== Willmar's Rice Memorial Hospital ===
In April 2021, CentraCare, which owns Willmar's Rice Memorial Hospital through its affiliate Carris Health, will bear the $32 million debt associated with the hospital from the city of Willmar.

== Criticism ==
In 2015 CentraCare acknowledged mistreatment of cancer patients treated at the CentraCare Health Coborn Cancer Center between summer 2012 and autumn 2014 by over- or underexposure to radiation, with consequences that could have included a "recurrence of cancer or burns and tissue damage that could have contributed to death".

In 2017 the US Federal Trade Commission, settling charges that CentraCare's acquisition of St. Cloud Medical Group, also known as SCMG, would be anticompetitive, required CentraCare "to allow a number of adult primary care, pediatric, and OB/GYN physicians to leave the health system and work for other local providers or establish a new practice in the area, and to provide certain financial incentives to a number of departing physicians".

In 2023 CentraCare told St. Cloud Orthopedics, which had for decades provided orthopedic trauma care at St. Cloud Hospital, that its doctors would no longer be on call for trauma care in the hospital's emergency department, significantly reducing the number of patients seeking follow-up care with St. Cloud Orthopedics. St. Cloud Orthopedics said that Centracare was trying to "strongarm them out of business".

A class action lawsuit alleging that CentraCare violated the federal Employee Retirement Income Security Act of 1974 (ERISA) by "failing to comply with their fiduciary duties under ERISA to the Plans and to the Plans' participants in the management, operation, and administration of the Plan" reached a settlement after extensive negotiation in 2024.

CentraCare is not accredited by the Better Business Bureau (BBB). The BBB registered 12 complaints about CentraCare in the three years to 5 April 2025; six had been closed in the previous twelve months.
