= February 1924 =

Month of 1924

| << | February 1924 | | | | | >> |
| Su | Mo | Tu | We | Th | Fr | Sa |
| | | | | | 1 | 2 |
| 3 | 4 | 5 | 6 | 7 | 8 | 9 |
| 10 | 11 | 12 | 13 | 14 | 15 | 16 |
| 17 | 18 | 19 | 20 | 21 | 22 | 23 |
| 24 | 25 | 26 | 27 | 28 | 29 |

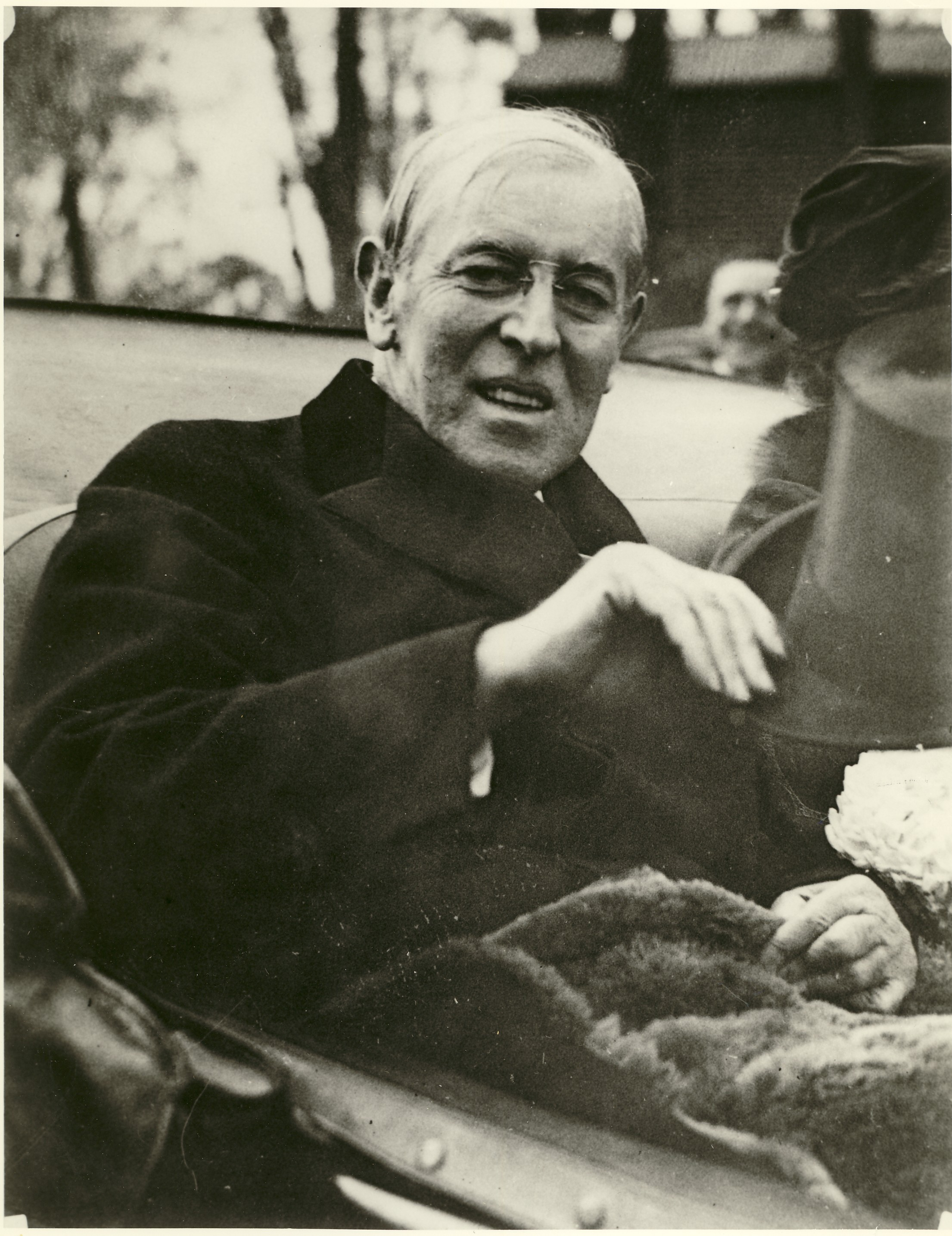
February 3, 1924: Former U.S. President Woodrow Wilson dies at age 67

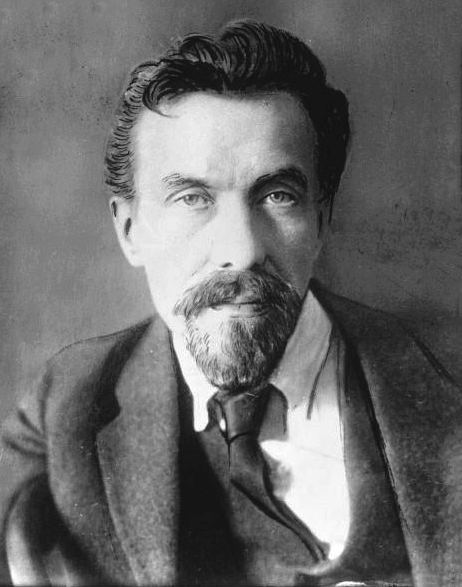
February 2, 1924: Alexei Rikov emerges as the new Premier of the Soviet Union

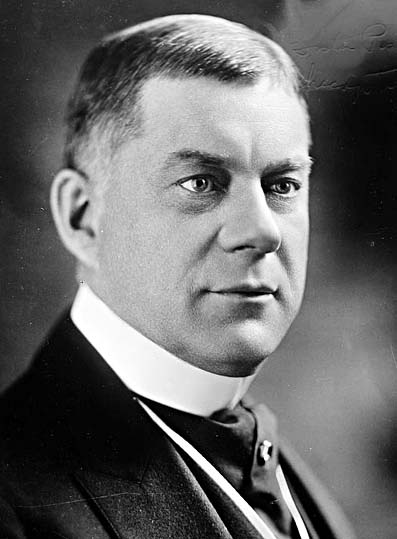
February 15, 1924: U.S. Senator Frank Greene seriously wounded in crossfire between bootleggers and Prohibition agents

The following events occurred in February 1924:

== February 1, 1924 (Friday) ==
- The British government formally recognized the Soviet Union and began diplomatic relations with Robert M. Hodgson as the first chargé d'affaires.
- Honduran President Rafael López Gutiérrez, who had been elected in 1919 for a 4-year term that started on February 1, 1920, refused to leave office after his term expired, citing the failure of the Honduran Congress to elect a president following the lack of any candidate to receive a majority in the 1923 presidential election.
- Born:
  - Richard Hooker, American surgeon and author who wrote MASH: A Novel About Three Army Doctors that was based on his experiences at a mobile army surgical hospital during the Korean War, and was later adapted into a successful film (1970) and an even more successful TV series, M*A*S*H (1972-1983); as Hiester Richard Hornberger Jr., in Trenton, New Jersey, United States (d. 1997)
  - Ruth Teitelbaum, American computer programmer, one of six women assigned to enter data into the U.S. Army's Electronic Numerical Integrator and Computer (ENIAC); as Ruth Lichterman, in the Bronx, New York City, United States (d. 1986)

== February 2, 1924 (Saturday) ==
- Alexei Rykov became Chairman of the Council of People's Commissars of the Soviet Union, equivalent to Prime Minister of the Soviet Union, filling the vacancy left by the death of Lenin.
- Felix Dzerzhinsky became Chairman of the Supreme Soviet of the National Economy.
- The International Ski Federation (FIS) was founded in Chamonix in France, site of France's International Ski Week, later recognized as the 1924 Winter Olympics, during a meeting of leaders of the skiing organizations of various nations.
- Woodrow Wilson fell into a coma shortly before 10:30 p.m.
- Born: Elfi von Dassanowsky, Austrian singer, pianist and film producer; as Elfriede Maria Elisabeth Charlotte Dassanowsky, in Vienna, Austria (d. 2007)

== February 3, 1924 (Sunday) ==
- Woodrow Wilson, who had served as President of the United States from 1913 to 1921, died at the age of 67 in his home at 2340 S Street NW in Washington, D.C., at 11:15 in the morning.
- The Soviet Union welcomed Britain's diplomatic recognition of the USSR as an "historic step" and pledged to "make every effort to settle all misunderstandings and develop and consolidate economic relations."
- Germany and Turkey signed a Treaty of Friendship.
- Astra Club, based in Tokyo, defeated Shukyu-Dan of Nagoya, 2 to 1, to win the Emperor's Cup in football.

== February 4, 1924 (Monday) ==
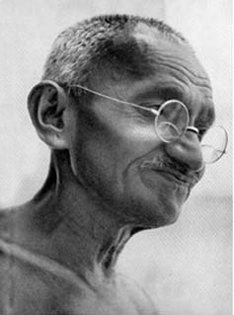
Gandhi in 1929

- Indian freedom fighter Mohandas K. Gandhi, known for his campaign of passive resistance in pursuing the independence of India from the British Empire, was released from incarceration in Ahmedabad after serving less than two years of his six-year prison sentence for sedition. The release came on the recommendation of British physicians that Gandhi should be allowed six months convalescence to recover from a serious illness.

== February 5, 1924 (Tuesday) ==
- A flash flood inside an underground iron mine drowned 41 of the 46 miners inside, after the crew conducted blasting too close to the bottom of Foley Lake near Crosby, Minnesota.
- At 17:30:00 UTC, the Greenwich Observatory in England, near London, began its service of broadcasting regular of broadcasting a time signal for the standard of the exact time of day by hour, minute and second as measured at Greenwich. According to a press release from Greenwich, "the last four seconds of the preceding minute will be heard as 'clicks' when the signal is about to be given, representing the 55th, 56th, 57th, 58th and 59th second, and the final click, which will be a little louder than the others" every minute on shortwave radio to be heard worldwide, with an announcement of the exact time.
- The Winter Olympics closed in Chamonix, France. Norway and Finland tied for the most gold medals with four each, but Norway won 17 total medals to Finland's 11.
- Mexican rebels retreated from their former stronghold of Veracruz when federal troops won a crucial victory at Córdoba.
- The Show-Off, a play by American playwright George Kelly, opened on Broadway at the Playhouse Theatre for the first of 571 performances.
- Born:
  - Patricia Lauber, American children's book author, chief editor of science for The New Book of Knowledge encyclopedia; in New York City, United States (d. 2010)
  - Robert Byron Bird, American chemical engineer and 1987 National Medal of Science recipient; in Bryan, Texas, United States (d. 2020)

== February 6, 1924 (Wednesday) ==
- The funeral of former U.S. President Woodrow Wilson was conducted. He was buried in a vault beneath the center aisle of the chapel of the Washington National Cathedral, becoming the first, and only, U.S. president to be buried in the District of Columbia.
- Demonstrators raised disturbances outside the German embassy in Washington. About 200 taxi drivers walked onto the embassy lawn, and after planting the American flag, saluted it amid cheers and pistol shots. The controversy arose after the German Embassy had refused to offer condolences or to lower flags in honor of the late President Wilson, who had led the U.S. against the German Empire during World War One from 1917 to 1918.
- Born: Sir John Richardson, British art historian; in London, England (d. 2019)
- Died:
  - Sir John Stewart, 1st Baronet, of Fingask, 46, Scottish whisky distiller; committed suicide at his home at Fingask Castle in Perthshire (b. 1877)
  - Queenie Scott-Hopper, 42-43, English children's author; committed suicide at her home in Whitley Bay, by slitting her own throat (b. 1881)

== February 7, 1924 (Thursday) ==
- Mexican rebel leader Adolfo de la Huerta and his staff withdrew by boat to Mérida, Yucatán after federal troops recaptured the key city of Veracruz.
- The Fascist government of Italy gave formal recognition of the Communist Soviet Union.

== February 8, 1924 (Friday) ==
- The first execution by lethal gas in American history was carried out in Carson City, Nevada at the Nevada State Prison. Chinese national Gee Jon, convicted of a gangland slaying, was put to death with a chemical reaction that put prussic acid into an airtight chamber.
- On the same day, the U.S. state of Texas executed five prisoners— all African-American inmates who had been convicted of murder— at the state penitentiary in Huntsville, Texas, in the state's first use of the electric chair. Starting at 12:09 a.m., Charles Reynolds was the first to die "as Warden Walter Monroe Miller threw the switch which sent 2,500 volts and 11 amperes of electricity into Reynolds's body. Over the next hour, E. L. Morris, George Washington and Mack Matthews were put to death. The fifth inmate, Melvin Johnson, was electrocuted after a one-hour stay of execution.
- The Nakhchivan Autonomous Soviet Socialist Republic was created by the Soviet Union within the Azerbaijan Soviet Socialist Republic. On January 20, 1990, it would become the first part of the Soviet Union to secede.
- U.S. President Calvin Coolidge signed a resolution ordering the Doheny and Sinclair petroleum leases to be nullified due to the Teapot Dome scandal.
- Born: Ada Sipuel Fisher, American civil rights activist and lawyer known for her successful 1948 challenge to racial segregation in the case of Sipuel v. Board of Regents of the University of Oklahoma; as Ada Lois Sipuel, in Chickasha, Oklahoma, United States (d. 1995)
- Died: Madame Sorgue, 59-60, French anarchist, feminist and labor activist referred to as "the most dangerous woman in Europe;" died of a heart attack (b. 1864)

== February 9, 1924 (Saturday) ==
- The Nakhchivan Autonomous Soviet Socialist Republic was established.
- Born:
  - Lady Wonder, American horse exhibited for her abilities to perform arithmetic and spelling while being accompanied by her owner and trainer, Claudia E. Fonda (d. 1957)
  - Major General John W. Hepfer, U.S. Air Force officer and missile development engineer who oversaw the creation of the Minuteman and Peacekeeper intercontinental ballistic missiles; in Waynesboro, Pennsylvania, United States (d. 1997)
- Died:
  - Annie Arniel, 50-51, American suffragist and women's rights activist; committed suicide (b. 1873)
  - David Dunnels White, 80, American farmer who served in the Union Army during the American Civil War, his nomination for a Medal of Honor was declined by the United States Army in 2016 (b. 1844)

== February 10, 1924 (Sunday) ==
- As the Drenica-Dukagjin Uprisings drew to a close in Kosovo, Yugoslavian troops carried out the massacre of 25 Albanian-minority civilians (including eight young children and ten women) in the Kosovan town of Dubnica, then set fire to the town.
- Mexican federal troops won a decisive battle over the rebels at Ocotlán.
- Born:
  - Bud Poile, Canadian, professional hockey player and sports administrator, inducted into the Hockey Hall of Fame as a builder of the sport; as Norman Poile, in Fort William, Ontario, Canada (d. 2005)
  - John Peterson, American children's author and creator of The Littles series; in Bradford, Pennsylvania, United States (d. 2002)
  - Marc St. Gil, Dutch-born American photojournalist; in Helmond, Netherlands (d. 1992)
  - Randy Van Horne, American singer and bandleader of the Randy Van Horne Singers known for singing the theme songs for The Flintstones, The Jetsons, and other Hanna-Barbera cartoons; in El Paso, Texas, United States (d. 2007)
  - Carlos Gonzaga, Brazilian singer; as José Gonzaga Ferreira, in Paraisópolis, Minas Gerais, Brazil (d. 2023)
  - Max Ferguson, English-born Canadian radio show host for the CBC; in Crook, County Durham, England (d. 2013)
- Died: Alfred Verhaeren, 83, Belgian painter (b. 1840)

== February 11, 1924 (Monday) ==
- The United States Senate voted, 47 to 34, to demand that President Coolidge remove Edwin Denby, who was under investigation for the Teapot Dome scandal, as Secretary of the Navy. Coolidge said in a statement that evening that, "As soon as special counsel can advise me as to the legality of these leases and assemble for me the pertinent facts in the various transactions, I shall take such action as seems essential for the full protection of the public interests".
- The five-day Negro Sanhedrin opened in Chicago with 250 delegates from trade unions, civic groups and fraternal organizations in an attempt to create a program to protect the legal rights of African-American tenant farmers.
- The Greek government deposited the instrument of ratification of the treaty of Lausanne, the peace treaty between Turkey and the Allied Powers, that was concluded on July 24, 1923.
- Born: Budge Patty, American tennis player who won the French Open and Wimbledon in 1950, later inducted to the International Tennis Hall of Fame; as Edward Patty, in Fort Smith, Arkansas, United States (d. 2021)
- Died: Jean-François Raffaëlli, 73, French painter, sculptor, and printmaker (b. 1850)

== February 12, 1924 (Tuesday) ==
- Howard Carter and his archaeological team had the lid of Pharaoh Tutankhamun's stone sarcophagus raised, revealing his solid gold mummy case. The case itself would not be opened until October 28, 1925.
- The George Gershwin musical composition Rhapsody in Blue premiered at the Aeolian Hall in New York City.
- The play Beggar on Horseback, by George S. Kaufman and Marc Connelly, opened on Broadway.
- L'Unita began a 67-year run as the official newspaper of the Italian Communist Party, before becoming an independent leftist periodical after the dissolution of the PCI. The paper would cease publication entirely in 2017.
- Born:
  - Ray Vasquez, American Latin-jazz singer and trombonist; in Los Angeles, United States (d. 2019)
  - David Rowland, American industrial designer known for inventing the first compactly stackable chair, the 40/4 Chair; in Los Angeles, United States (d. 2010)
- Died: Ernest Joy, 46, American stage actor (b. 1878)

== February 13, 1924 (Wednesday) ==
- German nationalists attacked the headquarters of Rhineland separatists in Pirmasens, smashing their way into the building and setting it ablaze, while snipers outside shot at the separatists. The fighting and the blaze killed 36 people, most of them separatists, an elderly woman bystander was killed by a stray bullet.
- The first fascist event ever held in public in the United Kingdom took place at the Hotel Cecil in London, as about 500 members of the British Fascisti and Italian expatriates attended.
- The day after testifying in the trial of Shoeless Joe Jackson, former Chicago White Sox outfielder Oscar "Happy" Felsch was arrested for perjury in testimony given as a rebuttal witness for Jackson. The arrest came after lawyers for the Chicago White Sox produced letters that contradicted Felsch's statements. Felsch posted his own $2,000 bail and was released.
- Howard Carter abruptly suspended work on Tutankhamun's tomb and had it resealed, "owing to the impossible restrictions and discourtesies on the part of the public works department and its antiquity section." The dispute was reportedly about media access rights.

== February 14, 1924 (Thursday) ==
- The Computing-Tabulating-Recording Company (CTR) renamed itself the International Business Machines Corporation, or IBM.
- Mexican federal troops inflicted another defeat on rebels near Paloverde southwest of Pénjamo.
- The planned city of Longview, Washington, was incorporated after being designed by city planner George Kessler for the Long-Bell Lumber Company to house 11,000 residents who were employees and their families.
- Part 1 of the Fritz Lang fantasy film Die Nibelungen premiered at the Ufa-Palast am Zoo in Berlin.
- Born: Juan Ponce Enrile, Philippine politician who served as Minister of National Defense from 1970 to 1986, President of the Senate of the Philippines from 2008 to 2013, and Chief Presidential Legal Counsel from 2022 until his death in 2025; as Juanito Furagganan, in Gonzaga, Cagayan, Philippine Islands (present-day Philippines) (d. 2025)

== February 15, 1924 (Friday) ==
- U.S. troops began their intervention in the civil war in Honduras, with 167 U.S. Marines and nine officers landing at Ampala after being brought by the battle cruiser USS Milwaukee.
- U.S. Senator Frank L. Greene of Vermont was seriously wounded when he was shot in the head by a stray bullet during a shootout between Prohibition enforcement agents and bootleggers. Senator Greene had been walking along Washington's Pennsylvania Avenue with his wife and was left partially paralyzed.
- The jury in the Joe Jackson-White Sox case awarded Jackson over $16,000 in unpaid salary. However, Judge Gregory declared that the plaintiff's case was based on perjury and declared a mistrial. Jackson was triumphant at the verdict despite it being set aside.
- In Germany, the enabling act of December 8 expired under its own terms, after having allowed Chancellor Wilhelm Marx and his cabinet to issue emergency decrees. In the first session of the Reichstag afterward, legislators began the process of attempting to repeal the Marx cabinet decrees.
- Born: Helmut Oberlander, Nazi war criminal who was a member of the Einsatzgruppen death squad in the occupied Soviet Union during World War II, and immigrated to Canada in 1954; in Halbstadt, Ukrainian SSR, Soviet Union (present-day Molotschna, Ukraine) (d. 2021)
- Died: Lionel Monckton, 62, English composer for stage musicals (b. 1861)

== February 16, 1924 (Saturday) ==
- Nearly 200,000 British dock workers went on strike.
- German artist George Grosz was fined 500 gold marks (6,000 marks) when a collection of his drawings depicting the decadence of Berlin society was ruled obscene by the court.
- Born:
  - Colin Hayes, Australian racehorse trainer; in Semaphore, South Australia, Australia (d. 1999)
  - Ray Gunkel, American amateur and professional wrestler who was fatally injured during a match; in Chicago, United States (d. 1972)
  - Nguyen Khac Chinh, South Vietnamese anti-Communist novelist and playwright who was imprisoned for almost 17 years between 1975 and 1992; in Quang Nam province, French Indochina (present-day Vietnam) (d. 2016)
- Died:
  - Henry Bacon, 57, American architect best known for designing the Lincoln Memorial; died of cancer (b. 1866)
  - John William Kendrick, 70, American railroad executive (b. 1853)
  - Wilhelm Schmidt, 65, German engineer and inventor who developed the technology for superheated steam (Heissdampf) for steam engines and founded the company Schmidtsche Heissdampfgesellschaft (b. 1858)
  - Tony Boeckel, 31, American major league baseball infielder from 1917 until his death; died after being seriously injured in a car accident (b. 1892)

== February 17, 1924 (Sunday) ==
- A referendum on employment protection was held in Switzerland. Voters rejected a proposed amendment to the federal employment protection law.
- The Western film The Night Hawk starring Harry Carey was released.
- Herma Szabo of Austria won the women's competition of the World Figure Skating Championships held in Oslo, Norway.
- Born:
  - Margaret Truman, American classical soprano singer, daughter of U.S. President Harry S. Truman and Bess Truman; as Mary Margaret Truman, in Independence, Missouri, United States (d. 2008)
  - Lasse Sandberg, Swedish cartoonist and children's book illustrator; in Stockholm, Sweden (d. 2008)

== February 18, 1924 (Monday) ==
- A series of explosions at the W. P. Gilbert trench warfare filling factory killed 12 young women and a male foreman who were employees in south east London at the borough of Slade Green, near Dartford.
- The popular U.S. comic strip Boots and Her Buddies, by Edgar Martin, was published for the first time and would run for 44 years until ending on October 6, 1968.
- American jazz cornet player and composer Bix Beiderbecke (Leon Bismark Beiderbecke) made his recording debut as he and his band The Wolverines created the 78 rpm record "Fidgety Feet" for Gennett Studios, with "Jazz Me Blues" on the opposite side.
- British Prime Minister Ramsay MacDonald warned against profiteers extracting "unjust prices" during the dock worker's strike.
- The cost of a four-pound loaf of bread went up a halfpenny to eightpence-halfpenny as a result of the dock strike.
- Born:
  - Sam Rolfe, American screenwriter best known for co-creating the TV western series Have Gun – Will Travel; as Samuel Rosenbaum, in New York City, United States (d. 1993)
  - Harold Finger, American aeronautical nuclear engineer director of the Space Nuclear Propulsion Office; in Brooklyn, New York, United States (alive in 2026)
- Died: Victor Capoul, 84, French operatic tenor (b. 1839)

== February 19, 1924 (Tuesday) ==
- After less than four weeks in office, Eleftherios Venizelos resigned as Prime Minister of Greece because of bad health and was succeeded by Agriculture Minister Georgios Kafantaris.
- An initial outline of the Dawes committee's financial plan was presented to French Prime Minister Raymond Poincaré in Paris.
- Born: Lee Marvin, American film and television actor, winner of the 1965 Academy Award for Best Actor for Cat Ballou; as Lamont Walton Marvin Jr., in New York City, United States (d. 1987)

== February 20, 1924 (Wednesday) ==
- The Volga German Autonomous Soviet Socialist Republic was set up for the ethnic German minority in the Soviet Union, with a capital city of Kosakenstadt, now Engels in the Saratov Oblast. It would exist until its abolition by the USSR on September 7, 1941 in response to the invasion by Nazi Germany.
- French military leaders objected to a clause in the Dawes proposal that would return the railroads in the occupied Ruhr region to German control.
- Born:
  - Gloria Vanderbilt, American fashion designer and socialite, mother of journalist Anderson Cooper; in New York City, United States (d. 2019)
  - Gerson Goldhaber, German-born American particle physicist, co-discoverer of the J/psi meson subatomic particle confirming the existence of the "charm quark" in 1974; in Chemnitz, Germany (d. 2010)
  - Lis Mellemgaard, Danish spy for the Holger Danske resistance group during World War II; as Liss Wognsen, in Copenhagen, Denmark (d. 2019)
- Died: Louis Péringuey, 68, South African entomologist who specialized in insects and reptiles and director of the South African Museum in Cape Town (b. 1855). The genus Peringueyella of katydids is named in his honor, as are the reptile species Peringuey's leaf-toed gecko (Cryptactites peringueyi) and Peringuey's adder (Bitis peringueyi) and the black cocktail ant (Crematogaster peringueyi).

== February 21, 1924 (Thursday) ==
- British dock workers rejected the terms offered to them for a settlement of the strike. Their employers had offered them an immediate 1 shilling-per-day raise with another shilling to be added June 1.
- The Republic of Austria gave formal recognition to the Soviet Union and opened diplomatic relations.
- The D. W. Griffith-directed film America premiered at the 44th Street Theatre in New York City.
- Born:
  - Robert Mugabe, Zimbabwean revolutionary and politician, served as the Prime Minister of Zimbabwe from 1980 to 1987 and as the President of Zimbabwe from 1987 to 2017; in Kutama, Southern Rhodesia (present-day Zimbabwe) (d. 2019)
  - Krishna Prakash Bahadur, Indian writer and philosopher; in Allahabad, United Provinces of Agra and Oudh, British India (present-day Prayagraj, Uttar Pradesh, India) (d. 2000)
- Died:
  - Annie R. Tinker, 39, American suffragist and philanthropist who left as her legacy the funding for financial of assistance of elderly women, the Annie R. Tinker Memorial Fund; died from surgical complications after a tonsillectomy (b. 1884)
  - Salvatore Auteri-Manzocchi, 78, Italian opera composer (b. 1845)

== February 22, 1924 (Friday) ==
- Calvin Coolidge became the first President to make a radio broadcast from the White House when he gave a national address on the occasion of George Washington's birthday.
- The Treaty of Rome signed on January 27 between the Kingdom of Italy and the Kingdom of Serbs, Croats and Slovenes took effect after being ratified by representatives of both parties, dissolving the Free State of Fiume and dividing it between the two kingdoms.
- A bill to provide for automatic U.S. citizenship for Native American peoples was introduced by U.S. Representative Homer P. Snyder, a Republican for the state of New York. The text of the Indian Citizenship Act stated "Be it enacted by the Senate and House of Representatives of the United States of America in Congress assembled, That all non citizen Indians born within the territorial limits of the United States be, and they are hereby, declared to be citizens of the United States: Provided That the granting of such citizenship shall not in any manner impair or otherwise affect the right of any Indian to tribal or other property."
- Born:
  - Jack Pierce, Canadian oil executive of Ranger Oil, co-lead the 1974 discovery of the 1.2 billion barrel Ninian Oil Field in the North Sea; as John Michael Pierce, in Westmount, Quebec, Canada (d. 1991)
  - Vincent Marotta, American inventor who co-invented the first automatic drip coffee maker, marketed as "Mr. Coffee"; in Cleveland, United States (d. 2015)

== February 23, 1924 (Saturday) ==
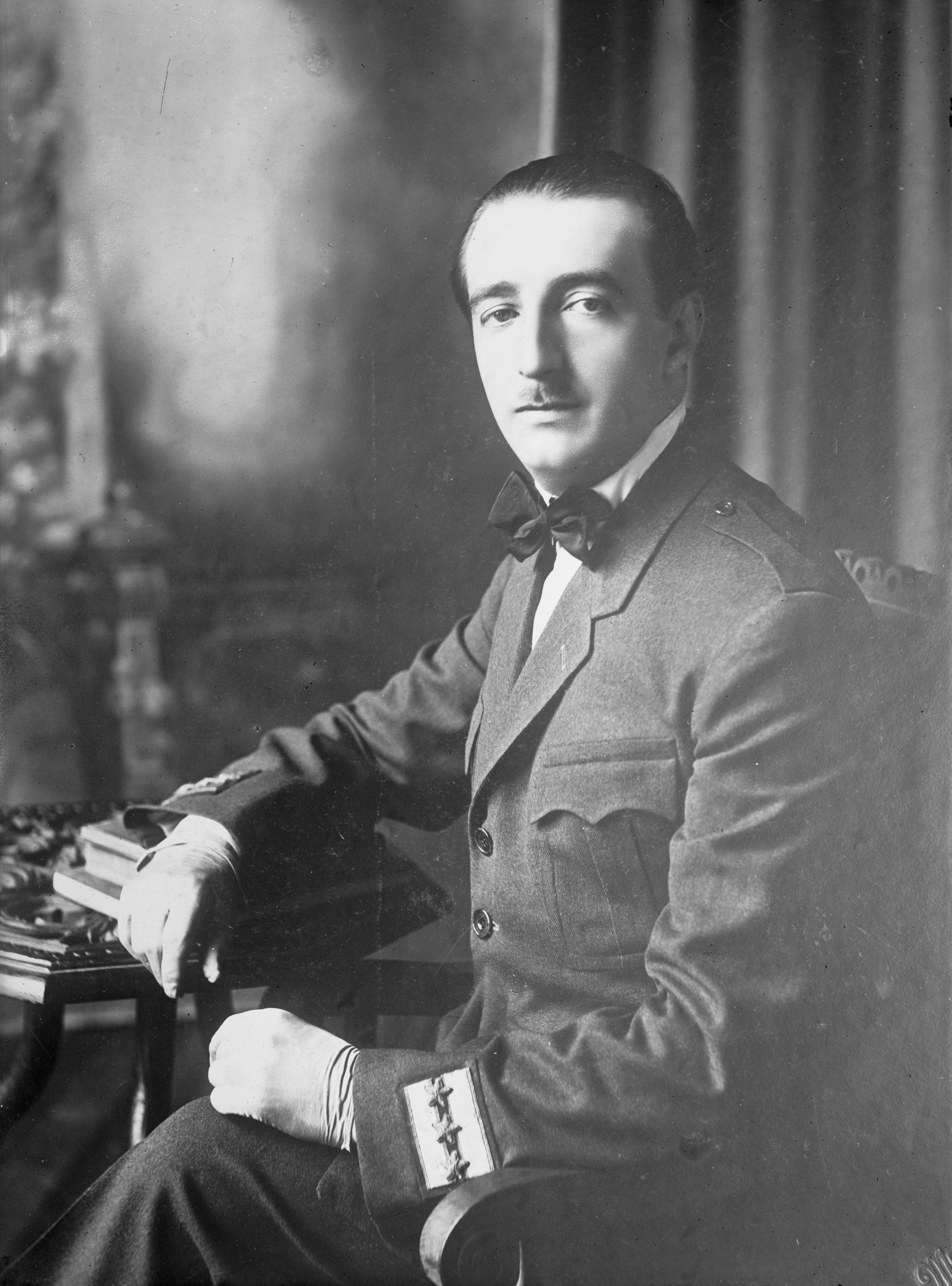
Prime Minister Zogu

- Albanian Prime Minister Ahmet Zogu was shot twice by anarchist Beqir Valteri after entering the Albanian Parliament building just before a parliamentary session. Zogu survived the assassination attempt, but was seriously wounded, and stepped down from his position for more than 10 months before returning the following January 6.
- The Royal Navy intervened in the dock worker's strike to move 4,500 bags of American mail.
- Born:
  - Allan McLeod Cormack, physicist and recipient of the Nobel Prize in Physiology or Medicine; in Johannesburg, Union of South Africa (present-day South Africa) (d. 1998)
  - Karel Hubáček, Czech architect known for designing the Ještěd Tower; in Prague, Czechoslovakia (d. 2011)
  - Ruben F. Mettler, American businessman, served as the CEO and chairman of TRW Inc. conglomerate from 1977 to 1988; in Shafter, California, United States (d. 2006)

== February 24, 1924 (Sunday) ==
- Designed by Henry Berliner and his father Emile Berliner, the Berliner gyrocopter Model No. 5, capable of flying at a speed of 40 miles per hour (64 km/h), to hover at an altitude of 15 feet (4.6 m), and to turn within a radius of 15 feet (4.6 m), was given its first successful demonstration. U.S. Army Lieutenant Harold R. Harris flew the machine for 1 minute and 20 seconds at College Park Airport near the University of Maryland, in front of U.S. Navy officials and members of the press.
- Mexican federal troops defeated rebels in a battle fought in an oil region in the state of Tamaulipas.
- The Beverly Hills Speedway hosted its final race, attended by 85,000. The track was torn down afterward because the rapidly increasing real estate values had rendered the track an uneconomical use of property. Harlan Fengler broke the world record for a 250-mile race, averaging 116.6 miles per hour (187.6 km/h).
- British dock workers voted to accept the offer of their employers to receive a rise of 1 shilling-per-day plus an additional shilling on June 1.
- Born: Ted Arison, Israeli businessman, co-founder of Norwegian Cruise Lines and founder of Carnival Cruise Lines; as Theodore Arison, in Tel Aviv, British Mandate for Palestine (present-day Israel) (d. 1999)

== February 25, 1924 (Monday) ==
- In the Soviet Union, the Politburo of the Soviet Communist Party began the task of National delimitation in Central Asia, setting specific boundaries for Soviet socialist republics for ethnic minorities. Among the changes was to partition the Turkestan ASSR into what are now the nations of Turkmenistan, Uzbekistan, and later forming Tajikistan and Kyrgyzstan, while what is now Kazakhstan was set aside in 1936.
- The Western film Ride for Your Life was released.
- The Cuban strike was settled.
- Born: Kurt Amplatz, Austrian radiologist, invented two devices that corrects atrial septal defect in infants; in Weistrach, Austria (d. 2019)

== February 26, 1924 (Tuesday) ==
- The trial of Adolf Hitler, Erich Ludendorff, and eight other Nazis for charges of treason arising from the Beer Hall Putsch of November 9, 1923, began in Munich. Security was heavy and onlookers were thoroughly searched for weapons before being allowed in.
- The Transport and General Workers Union dock workers ended their strike.
- Born:
  - Freda Betti, French mezzo-soprano singer; as Frédérique Thérèse Augusta Betti, in Nice, France (d. 1979)
  - Noboru Takeshita, Japanese politician, served as the Prime Minister of Japan from 1987 to 1989; in Unnan, Shimane Prefecture, Empire of Japan (present-day Japan) (d. 2000)
- Died: George Randolph Chester, 55, American fiction author and film director; died of a heart attack (b. 1869)

== February 27, 1924 (Wednesday) ==
- The government of Prime Minister Georges Theunis fell in Belgium over a vote on a Franco-Belgian import-export bill. The news caused the ailing French franc to immediately drop to a new low, 24.50 to the U.S. dollar.
- Gillis Grafström of Sweden won the men's competition in the World Figure Skating Championships in Manchester, England.
- Born:
  - Dr. Vijayalakshmi Ramanan, Indian surgeon and the first woman to be commissioned as an officer in the Indian Air Force; in Madras, Presidency of Fort St. George, British India (present-day Chennai, Tamil Nadu, India) (d. 2020)
  - Cleve Backster, American interrogation specialist for the CIA; as Grover Cleveland Backster Jr., in Lafayette, New Jersey, United States (d. 2013)
  - Harry Likas, American tennis player, 1948 NCAA tennis champion and inductee to the Intercollegiate Tennis Association Hall of Fame; as Henry Edward Likas Jr., in San Francisco, United States (d. 2017)

== February 28, 1924 (Thursday) ==
- The Kingdom of Yugoslavia increased its troop presence on its border with Bulgaria across from Pernik, in response to raids from Macedonian irregulars from the area.
- Born: Christopher C. Kraft Jr., American engineer and NASA administrator, served as the Flight Director for the Mercury Program; in Chesapeake City, Virginia, United States (present-day Phoebus, Virginia) (d. 2019)

== February 29, 1924 (Friday) ==
- Erich Ludendorff took the stand in his defense in the trial at Munich. He gave a long justification of the reasons for attempting the putsch, explaining, "We want a Germany free of Marxism, semitism, and papal influences."
- Born:
  - Carlos Humberto Romero, Salvadorian politician, served as the President of El Salvador from 1977 to 1979; in Chalatenango, El Salvador (d. 2017)
  - Al Rosen, American professional baseball player, 1953 American League MVP and AL home run leader in 1950 and 1953; as Albert Leonard Rosen, in Spartanburg, South Carolina, United States (d. 2015)
  - Agustín Hernández Navarro, Mexican sculptor, poet, and architect; in Mexico City, Mexico (d. 2022)
