= University of Minnesota Hospital =

University of Minnesota Hospital may refer to:

- University of Minnesota Children's Hospital, on west bank of the Mississippi River in Minneapolis
- University of Minnesota Medical Center, the main university hospital for the University of Minnesota Medical School, located in Minneapolis
- University of Minnesota Veterinary Teaching Hospital
- University of Minnesota Veterinary Medical Center's Small Animal Hospital
