= Bethesda Hospital (Saint Paul, Minnesota) =

Coordinates: 44°57′30″N 93°6′11″W

- M Health Fairview
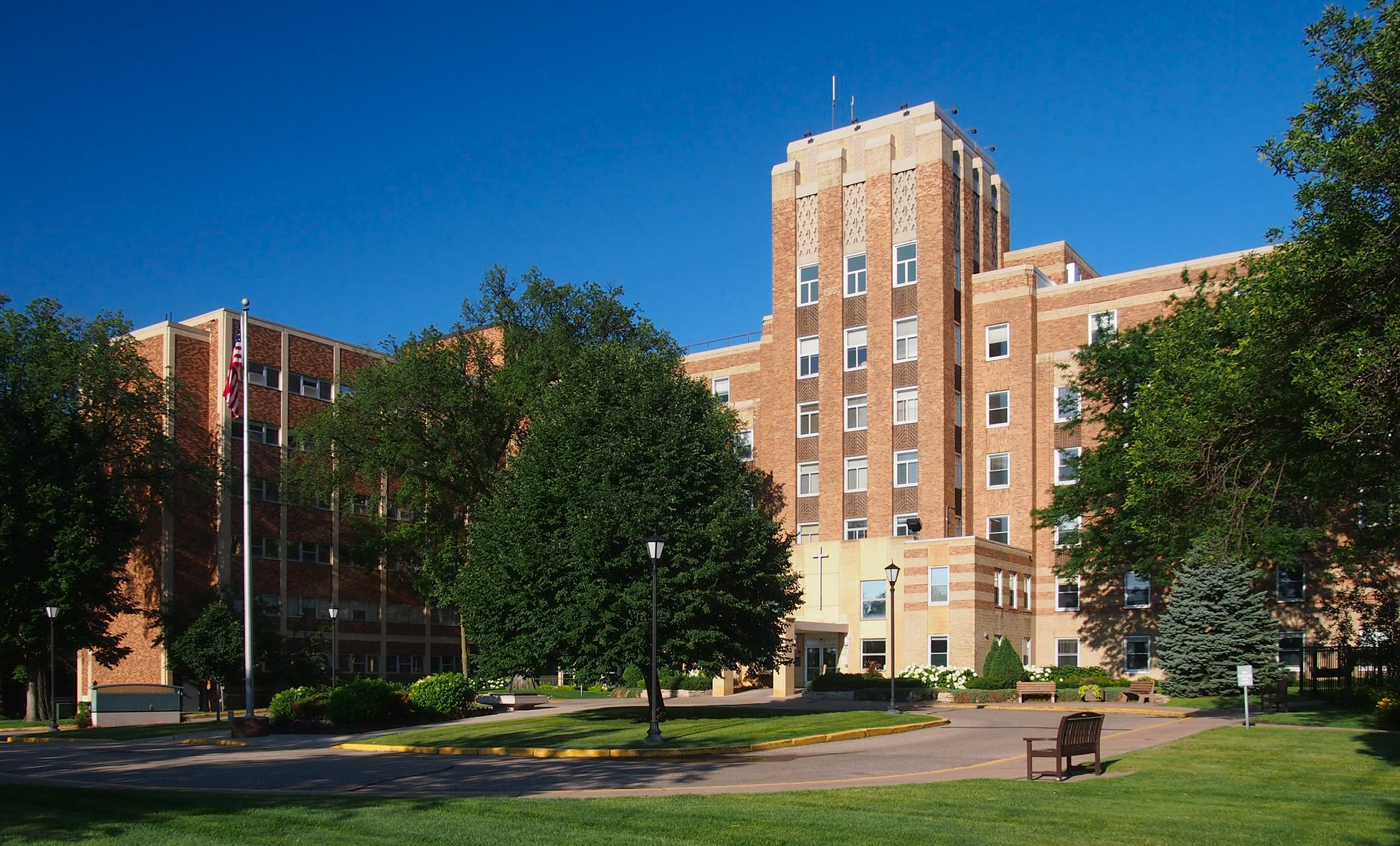
- Former Bethesda Hospital campus located at 559 N Capitol Blvd. from the northeast.

Geography
- Location: 45 West 10th Street, Saint Paul, Minnesota, United States

Organisation
- Type: Specialist

Services
- Standards: Accredited by Joint Commission and CARF
- Beds: 103
- Speciality: Respiratory Care; Complex Medical Care; Brain Injury Care; Medical Behavioral Services

History
- Constructed: 1931
- Founded: 1883
- Closed: 2020
- Demolished: 2023

Links
- Website: M Health Fairview, Bethesda Hospital

Bethesda Hospital was a long-term acute care hospital in St. Paul, Minnesota, United States. It was accredited by the Joint Commission and the Commission on Accreditation of Rehabilitation Facilities (CARF). Previously a part of the HealthEast Care System, Bethesda Hospital was a part of the M Health Fairview care system at the time of its closure.

It was demolished in 2023, to make way for a New Behavioral Health Hospital licensed for 144 inpatient beds on the same site.

Bethesda Hospital was one of only two long-term acute care hospitals (LTACHs) in Minnesota. Long-term acute care hospitals deliver specialized, extended, aggressive medical care for patients who have experienced a life-changing illness or injury like stroke, multiple organ failure following major surgery, traumatic accidents involving spinal cord damage or brain injury, etc.

== History ==
Bethesda Hospital opened its doors in 1883 as a community hospital in St. Paul, Minnesota. It was founded by the Rev. A.P. Monten, D.D., pastor of the first Swedish Lutheran Church in St. Paul, with the sponsorship of the Tabitha Society of the Swedish Lutheran Minnesota Conference. Bethesda treated generations of neighborhood families until January, 1989, when it transformed from a short-term community hospital to a long-term acute care hospital (LTACH). There are approximately 400 such facilities throughout the country.

In 2021, Bethesda Hospital services were relocated to the former St. Joseph's Hospital campus (now the Fairview Community Health and Wellness Hub) in St. Paul, Minnesota.

== Care and services ==
LTACH patients usually have medically complex diagnoses or multiple medical conditions which require hospitalization in excess of 25 days. As a specialty hospital, Bethesda served more than 2,000 individuals annually in its inpatient programs of Respiratory Care; Complex Medical Care; Brain Injury Services; and Medical Behavioral Services. Examples of the scope of these services are as follows:

Respiratory Care patients suffer from severe respiratory failure or chronic respiratory disability; they may come directly from a community hospital's intensive care unit for ventilator weaning. They receive intensive services from respiratory therapists and undergo physical, occupational and speech therapy as indicated by the individual patient's treatment plan. All care is supervised by pulmonologists.

Bethesda Hospital had vent weaning success rates that consistently exceed national industry benchmarks, with 65% of its patients weaned from a ventilator (after failing vent weaning in a short term acute care hospital) compared with a national score of 59.9%.

Complex Medical patients generally arrive with multiple system failure. These patients can require infusion therapy. Many of them receive specialty wound care using the latest technology to treat and heal wounds which often requires frequent and complex dressing changes that are overseen by physicians, nurse practitioners and staff nurses who specialize in wound care. Bethesda Hospital used MIST therapy for some of its most challenging wound cases.

Brain Injury Services patients comprise about 20 percent of the population admitted to Bethesda Hospital. Their brain injury could either be traumatic (resulting from a fall or a blow to the head) or vascular (the result of a stroke). Bethesda utilizes the Functional Independence Measure (FIM) score to assess the quality of care in this program. FIM is a disability assessment on 18 functional items. Patients receive a score of 18 – 126. The hospital's current FIM improvement score is 31.7 compared with a national score of 23.6.

Medical Behavioral Services patients are admitted with complex medical problems and medication management issues compounded by Alzheimer's disease or dementia. The average length of stay in this program is 30 days.

Outpatient services include Alzheimer's & Memory Loss Care, Brain Injury Care, Capistrant Center for Parkinson's Disease and Movement Disorders, Concussion Clinic, Nutrition Services, Physical Medicine Services and Psychology Services.

Bethesda Hospital offered a wide range of therapies including a healing arts program, animal-assisted therapy and Virtual reality therapy (also known as “Wii-hab”).

== Operational data for 2009 ==
Staffed Beds: 102

Number of Employees: 704

Average Daily Census: 95

Patient Admissions: Respiratory (47%), Complex Medical (20%), Medical Behavioral (16%), Brain Injury (14%)

== Awards ==
Bethesda Hospital received the following awards:

- National Alliance on Mental Illness (NAMI) Exemplary Psychiatrist: Awarded to Robert Sevenich, MD, JD and Medical Director for brain injury services at Bethesda Hospital (2009)
- Eleven Who Care: KARE-11 TV award to John Mastel, former patient, for his long-term volunteer contributions in stroke support (2009) and to Eleanor Jahnke for 75 years of employed and volunteer service (2008)
- National Association of Long-Term Hospitals Goldberg Innovation Award: For integrated model of care (2007)
- American Psychological Association: Best practices honor for BRAVOe, an employee engagement program (2007)
- HealthCare Hero Award: Presented by Twin Cities Business magazine to John Mastel for his 25+ years as support group leader and creator of peer visitors program (2009)
- Innovations in Healthcare Awards: Rahul Koranne, MD and Medical Director of Bethesda Hospital, served as physician lead on HealthEast's Care Navigation Strategy to transform current health delivery system. Received designation from HealthPartners (2009) and Minnesota Hospital Association (2010)
