= Woodwinds Health Campus =

- M Health Fairview

Geography
- Location: Woodbury, Minnesota, Minnesota, United States
- Coordinates: 44.921877°N 92.976239°W

Organization
- Care system: M Health Fairview
- Type: Community
- Affiliated university: Northwestern Health Sciences University
- Network: M Health Fairview

Services
- Standards: JCAHO certified
- Emergency department: Level IV trauma center
- Beds: 86 beds

History
- Founded: 2000

Links
- Website: www.fairview.org/locations/Woodwinds-Health-Campus
- Lists: Hospitals in Minnesota

Woodwinds Health Campus is a hospital in Woodbury, Minnesota. It is currently part of M Health Fairview and a former member of the HealthEast Care System. It was recognized as innovative for successfully blending integrative health services with traditional medicine. Woodwinds is a full-service 86-bed hospital, located on 30-acres of wetlands. It was one of three hospitals nationally recognized by the U.S. Department of Health & Human Services’ Agency for Healthcare Research and Quality (AHRQ), for its evidence-based healing environment and hospital design. It is a collaboration between M Health Fairview and Children’s Minnesota.

== History ==
Woodwinds Health Campus opened in August 2000 and is the first and only hospital in Woodbury, Minnesota. Woodwinds Health Campus includes The Natural Care Center by Northwestern Health Sciences University and offers non-traditional treatments such as chiropractic and acupuncture. It also has a community resource center open to community members, patients, visitors and staff.

== Care and services ==
Woodwinds is one of the leading orthopaedic care centers in the Twin Cities and has created an Orthopaedic Learning Center where doctors from around the world can learn new orthopaedic techniques. It's also one of the first hospitals in the Twin Cities to offer computer-assisted knee surgery for people undergoing total joint replacement and one of the first hospitals to offer artificial disc surgery for patients with lower back pain. It's one of the first hospitals in the nation to have acupuncturists on staff who make daily rounds and provide acupuncture to patients to reduce pain, nausea and anxiety, whether they having a baby, undergoing surgery or emergency care.

Woodwinds includes a Level 4 trauma center, Certified Stroke Care Center, and Heart & Lung Care. Its Maternity Care Unit has had the highest patient satisfaction in the nation according to Press Ganey.

Woodwinds nurses have achieved the highest employee engagement scores ever recorded by Gallup.

== Awards ==
In 2010, Becker's Hospital Review named Woodwinds as one of the Top 100 Best Places to Work in Healthcare in the country. HealthGrades rates Woodwinds’ orthopaedic program as the best in the state and named Woodwinds an Outstanding Patient Experience award winner in 2010-2011 based on patient satisfaction data as measured by NRC Picker Soliant Health named Woodwinds one of the Top 20 Most Beautiful Hospitals in the country. In 2009, Woodwinds was named a Thomson Reuters 100 Top Hospital. Blue Cross Blue Shield Association awarded Woodwinds a Blue Distinction for its expertise in hip and knee replacement as well as spine care. Also in 2009, Minnesota Hospital Association named Woodwinds the 2009 Best Minnesota Hospital Workplace for its holistic model of care and healing environment.
