= Skylab VIII =

Studio album by Rogério Skylab
- Released: July 29, 2008
- Recorded: September 2007
- Studio: Estúdio Cia. dos Técnicos
- Genre: Experimental rock; art rock; noise rock; samba rock; MPB
- Length: 1:14:18
- Label: Self-released
- Producer: Rogério Skylab

Rogério Skylab chronology
| Skylab VII (2007) | Skylab VIII (2008) | Skylab IX (2009) |

Professional ratings
Review scores
| Source | Rating |
|---|---|
| Just One More Night | (favorable) link |

Skylab VIII is the eighth studio album by the Brazilian musician Rogério Skylab, the eighth in his series of ten eponymous, numbered albums. It was self-released on July 29, 2008; to promote the album's release, Skylab made an exclusive performance at the Cine Lapa in Rio de Janeiro. Skylab VIII's liner notes state that it was dedicated to Marcos Petrillo, a long-time friend of Skylab who executive-produced his first two releases; he is also mentioned in the lyrics of "Meu Diário". Petrillo died on April 26, 2026, at the age of 67. Skylab has once claimed that while he doesn't think of Skylab VIII as one of his best albums, its cover art was one of his favorites.

A music video was made for the track "Eu Tô Sempre Dopado", directed by Amílcar Oliveira.

The track "Bat Masterson" is a parody of the Portuguese-language version of the theme song of the eponymous TV series, as sung by Carlos Gonzaga. "Casas da Banha" was re-recorded from his 1992 debut, Fora da Grei.

The album can be downloaded for free on Skylab's official website.

== Critical reception ==
Blog Just One More Night gave the album a favorable review, stating that "Skylab has considerably evolved since [the release of] Skylab [I]", and that "he and his band reach their creative peak with Skylab VIII".

== Track listing ==
All tracks are written by Rogério Skylab, except for "Tira Tudo" by Skylab and Alexandre Guichard.

| No. | Title | English title | Length |
|---|---|---|---|
| 1. | "Tira Tudo" | Take It All Off | 6:13 |
| 2. | "Eu Não Tô Entendendo" | I Don't Get It | 5:21 |
| 3. | "Bat Masterson" | | 4:11 |
| 4. | "Eu Tô Sempre Dopado" | I'm Always High | 4:07 |
| 5. | "Samba Bem Quente" | Really Hot Samba | 4:26 |
| 6. | "Eu Preciso de Você Comigo" | I Need You by My Side | 4:00 |
| 7. | "Batman" | | 4:11 |
| 8. | "Eu Estou Só" | I'm All Alone | 7:24 |
| 9. | "Ladrão É Polícia" | Cops Is Robbers | 4:50 |
| 10. | "Casas da Banha" | Lard Houses | 2:17 |
| 11. | "Peida, Peida" | Fart, Fart | 2:53 |
| 12. | "Cheirando Mal" | Stinking | 3:32 |
| 13. | "Eu Sou Cliente de Lá" | I'm a Regular There | 5:54 |
| 14. | "O Ar" | The Air | 7:09 |
| 15. | "Meu Diário" | My Diary | 2:47 |
| 16. | "Um Furo" | A Hole | 4:57 |

== Personnel ==
- Rogério Skylab – vocals, production
- Thiago Amorim – electric guitar
- Alexandre Guichard – classical guitar
- Rodrigo Saci – bass guitar
- Bruno Coelho – drums
- Gabriel Muzak – electric guitar (tracks 1 and 5)
- Vânius Marques – recording, mixing
- Ricardo Garcia – mastering
- Solange Venturi – photography
- Carlos Mancuso – cover art
