= M Health Fairview University of Minnesota Masonic Children's Hospital =

M Health Fairview Masonic Children's Hospital
- M Health Fairview

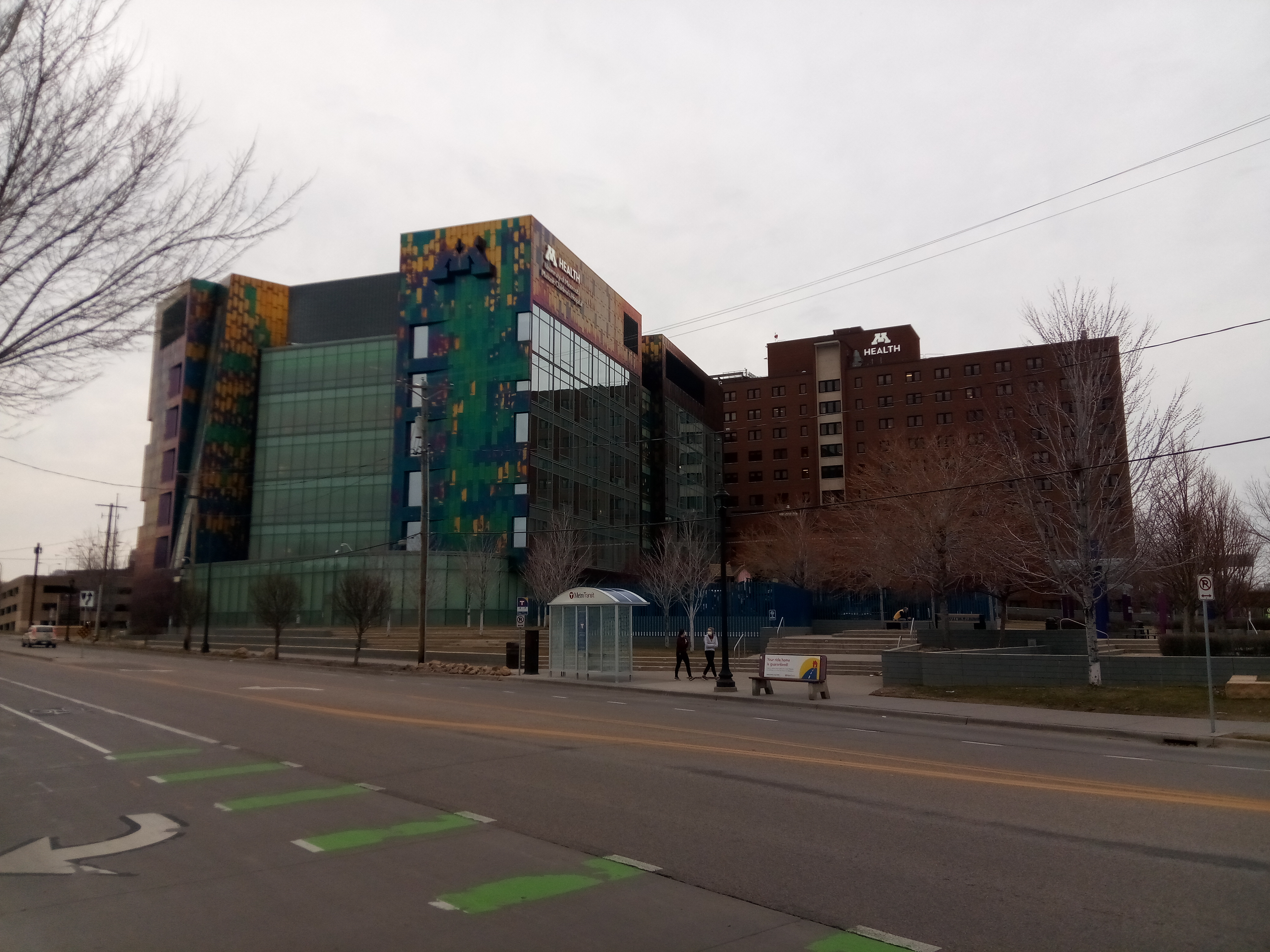

Geography
- Location: Minneapolis, Minnesota, United States
- Coordinates: 44°58′2″N 93°14′15″W

Organization
- Type: Specialist
- Affiliated university: University of Minnesota Medical School

Services
- Emergency department: Level III trauma center
- Beds: 212
- Specialty: Pediatric care

History
- Former names: Kurt Amplatz Children's Hospital, University-Variety Hospital for Children
- Opened: 1986

Links
- Website: www.mhealth.org/childrens
- Lists: Hospitals in Minnesota

M Health Fairview University of Minnesota Masonic Children's Hospital (formerly known as Amplatz Children's Hospital) is a non-profit pediatric acute care hospital located in Minneapolis, Minnesota. The hospital has 212 beds and is affiliated with University of Minnesota Medical School. The hospital provides comprehensive pediatric specialties and subspecialties to pediatric patients aged 0–21 throughout Minnesota and the Midwest United States. Masonic Children's Hospital is also a state designated Level III Trauma Center.

== History ==
The history of a University of Minnesota pediatric program went as far back as the 1930s when the first pediatric cardiology unit was opened. In 1951, this unit later expanded into a 40-bed pediatric unit at Variety Club Heart Hospital along with a playroom and classrooms. In 1986, pediatric services were brought together in a new general university hospital. The new hospital included 3 pediatric units: a neonatal intensive care unit, a pediatric intensive care unit (PICU), and a pediatric bone marrow transplant unit. The new facility was named University-Variety Hospital for Children. On the other side of town, Fairview Health (before merge) first opened its own dedicated pediatric unit in 1955. In 1997, M Health merged with Fairview.

The modern day children's hospital first opened in 2011 at a cost of $25 million and was initially named University of Minnesota Amplatz Children's Hospital. In 2014, the hospital was renamed to University of Minnesota Masonic Children's Hospital after a large donation from the Minnesota Mason's Charities. The hospital is 6 stories tall and includes multiple different inpatient units.

In 2025, ProPublica reported on a controversy related to the child abuse team at the children's hospital. The team was accused of overzealousness in accusing parents of child abuse and conclusively attributing symptoms as the result of child abuse when the causes of those symptoms were inconclusive and ambiguous.

== Services ==
Masonic Children's Hospital also features a level 4 neonatal intensive care unit.

It provides pediatric programs including pediatric general surgery, imaging, and neonatal and pediatric intensive care to cardiac and oncology services, blood and marrow transplant, bone marrow, and organ transplantation. The hospital also includes Minnesota's only children's behavioral inpatient unit and programming that focuses on children ages 12 and younger.

== See also ==
- M Health Fairview University of Minnesota Medical Center
- Shriners Children's
