= Michael Gonzalez-Wallace =

- Born: 25 February 1975; Madrid, Spain
- Occupations: Fitness Expert, Personal Trainer, Speaker, Medical Consultant
- Years active: 1993-Present
- Height: 6ft (183 cm)
- Website: http://www.superbodysuperbrain.com

Michael Gonzalez-Wallace (born February 25, 1975, in Madrid) is a personal trainer who developed a fitness programme called Super Body, Super Brain.

== Personal Trainer ==
In 2002 Gonzalez-Wallace became a personal trainer and created the exercise program Super Body, Super Brain, a mind-body exercise program incorporating fitness with neuroscience along with a physician-endorsed workout regimen. Over the past ten years he has created workout and fitness plans for top magazines across the United States. O magazine, [MSNBC|MSNBC.com], Redbook, and Prevention magazine among others.

== Background ==
Michael Gonzalez-Wallace played semi-pro basketball in Spain, where his team, Club Estudiantes de Baloncesto, won the Spanish National Competition. He graduated from the Autonomous University of Madrid.

In 2002, he became a personal trainer for New York Sports Club.

== Books and DVDs ==
In 2006 Gonzalez-Wallace launched The Brain Muscle Workout. In 2007 he started working with a neuroscientist, John Martin, from Columbia University. He found the exercises required no coordination patterns, by challenging posture and balancing limb movement.

In 2010 he published his first book with Harper One, Super Body, Super Brain that reached the Best Selling List in Amazon after being featured in CBS The Early Show.

== School Program ==
In October 2008 his program was introduced to the New York City Department of Education starting with an Elementary School in the Bronx, PS 277 Michael Gonzalez-Wallace designed the individualized fitness program with the supervision of Child Psychiatrist Dr Gregory Lombardo MD, PH.D. The school fitness program incorporates intense brain activity through movements requiring balance and coordination to improve concentration and attention while performing challenging exercises. The exercises are structured to advance gradually. In January 2009 WABC-TV featured the school fitness program in their local channel.

== Hospitals ==
In 2010 the Center for Parkinson and Movement Disorders at Bethesda Hospital started to use Super Body, Super Brain as part of their treatment program for Parkinson's disease. Other hospitals have used the program for their employees, while Englewood Hospital has a pilot program underway for staff and breast cancer patients.
