= Itapeva =

Itapeva may refer to the following places in Brazil:

- Itapeva, Minas Gerais
- Itapeva, São Paulo
