= Fernão Dias Environmental Protection Area =

Protected area of Minas Gerais, Brazil

- Área de Proteção Ambiental Fernão Dias
- IUCN category V (protected landscape/seascape)
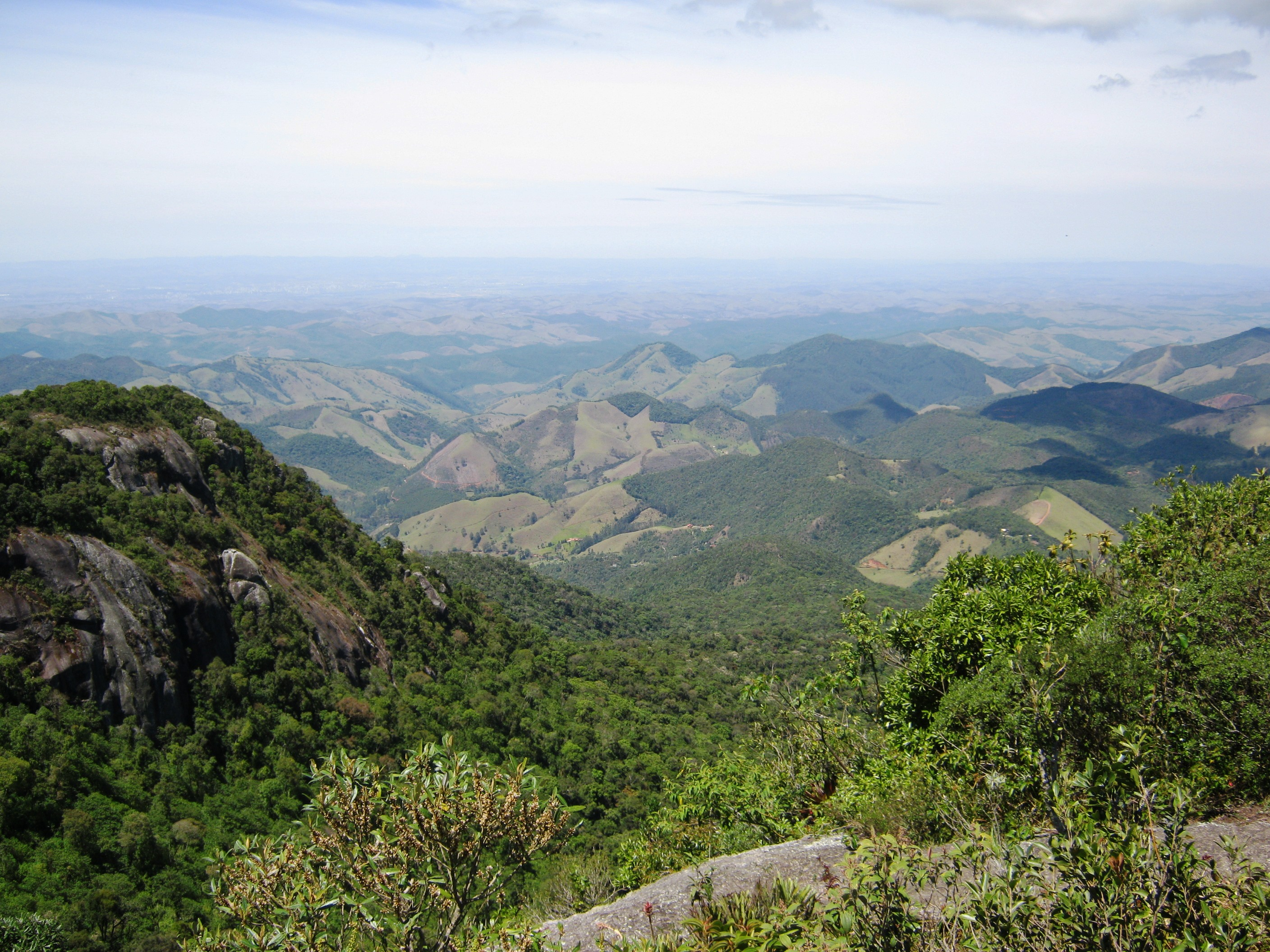

- Location within Brazil
- Nearest city: Camanducaia, Minas Gerais
- Coordinates: 22.748163°S 46.025482°W
- Area: 180,373 hectares (445,710 acres)
- Designation: Environmental protection area
- Created: 17 July 1997

The Fernão Dias Environmental Protection Area (Portuguese: Área de Proteção Ambiental Fernão Dias) is an Environmental protection area in the state of Minas Gerais, Brazil.

== Location ==
The Fernão Dias Environmental Protection Area (APA) is divided between the municipalities of Sapucaí-Mirim, Brasópolis, Camanducaia, Extrema, Gonçalves, Itapeva, Paraisópolis and Toledo in Minas Gerais. It has an area of 180,373 hectares (445,710 acres). It covers part of the basin of the Jaguari River in the municipalities of Sapucaí-Mirim, Camanducaia, Itapeva, Extrema and Toledo, and the basins of the Sapucaí-Mirim and Sapucaí rivers in the municipalities of Sapucaí-Mirim, Gonçalves, Paraisópolis and Brasópolis.

== History ==
The Fernão Dias Environmental Protection Area was created by state decree 38.925 on 17 July 1997 to protect areas of ecological interest in the basins of the Jaguari, Sapucaí-Mirim and Sapucaí rivers. As well as conserving the landscape and regional culture, the APA aims to preserve the remaining Atlantic Forest fragments and associated wildlife through control over use of natural resources and incentives for regional eco-development.

The APA was created under an agreement between the São Paulo and Minas Gerais governments to share environmental management in the border region between the two states. The same agreement covered creation of the Sapucaí Mirim Environmental Protection Area in São Paulo, protecting the headwaters of the Sapucaí River. The APA is part of the Mantiqueira Mosaic of conservation units, established in 2006.

== Sources ==
- APA Fernão Dias (in Portuguese), ISA: Instituto Socioambiental
- APA Sapucaí-Mirim (in Portuguese), ISA: Instituto Socioambiental
- o mosaico mantiqueira (in Portuguese), Mosaico Mantiqueira, archived from the original on 2016-09-27
