= Simon Reisman =

Canadian civil servant

- Born: 19 June 1919; Montreal, Quebec
- Died: 9 March 2008 (aged 88); Ottawa, Ontario
- Education: McGill University (BA 1941, MA 1942); London School of Economics (1945)
- Spouse: Constance Augusta Carin (m. 1942)
- Military career
- Allegiance: Canada
- Branch: Canadian Army
- Service years: 1942–1946
- Rank: Captain
- Unit: Royal Regiment of Canadian Artillery
- Conflicts: World War II

Sol Simon Reisman OC (19 June 1919 – 9 March 2008) was a Canadian civil servant, and the country's chief negotiator for the Canada-United States Free Trade Agreement.

== Biography ==
Born in Montreal, Quebec, the son of Kolman and Manya Reisman, Reisman graduated from Baron Byng High School before receiving a Bachelor of Arts degree in economics and political science in 1941 and a Master of Arts degree in 1942 from McGill University. He was a veteran of the Second World War, having served in Italy, the Netherlands and Germany with the Royal Canadian Artillery. After the war, he studied at the London School of Economics.

In 1946, he entered public service joining the Department of Labour. Reisman was a member of Canada's delegation to the inaugural session of the General Agreement on Tariffs and Trade in the late 1940s. He made major contributions toward the drafting of the Canada-U.S. Auto Pact. Reisman rose to senior positions in the public service, including deputy minister in the Department of Finance and the Department of Industry before retiring in 1975. Following the election of Brian Mulroney, Reisman sent the new prime minister a memo advocating free trade negotiations with the United States. Mulroney accepted Reisman's plan and, in 1985, tapped him to lead Canada's trade negotiations with the United States. Between 1991 and 2000, Reisman served as the Chairman of the Board of Ranger Oil Limited.

Reisman was made an Officer of the Order of Canada in 1978 and received the Outstanding Public Service Award in 1974.

He was married to Constance Carin for 65 years. They had three children, Joe, Anna, and Harriet, and nine grandchildren. He is uncle to Heather Reisman of Indigo Books of Toronto.

He died at Ottawa, Ontario on March 9, 2008, at the age of 88.
