= M Health Fairview University of Minnesota Medical Center =

Hospital in Minneapolis, Minnesota, US

- M Health Fairview
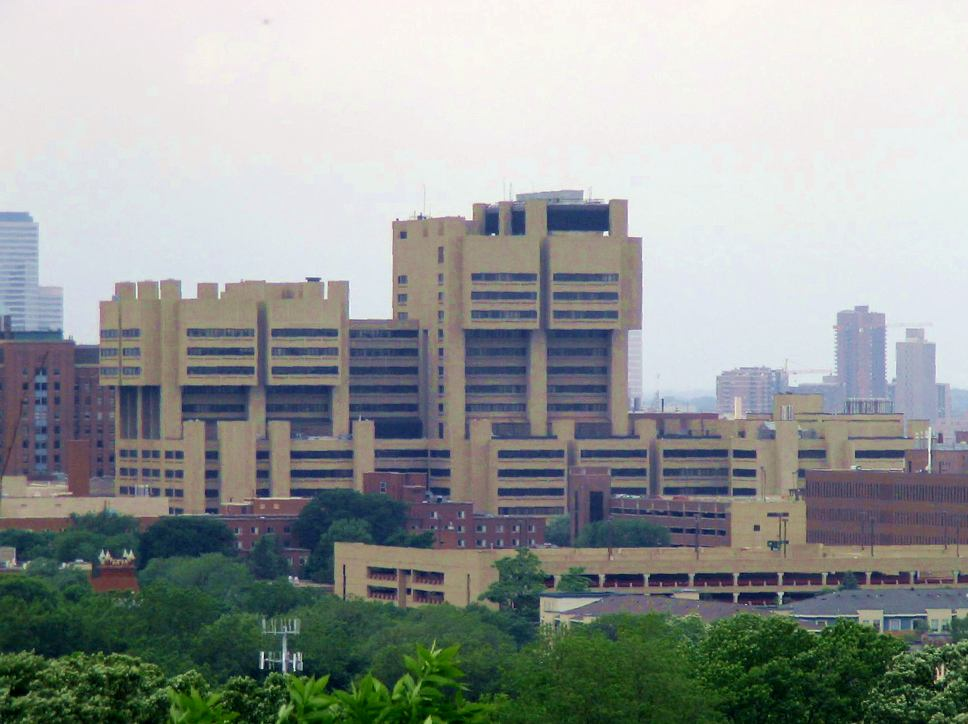
- Phillips-Wangensteen, Moos Tower and other buildings in the East Bank complex

Geography
- Location: 2450 Riverside Ave, Minneapolis, Minnesota, United States
- Coordinates: 44.967372°N 93.237035°W

Organization
- Type: Teaching
- Affiliated university: University of Minnesota

Services
- Emergency department: Level III Trauma Center
- Beds: 1700
- Speciality: Teaching

Helipads
- Helipad: FAA LID: MY65

History
- Former name: University of Minnesota Medical Center
- Opened: 1911

Links
- Website: www.mhealthfairview.org
- Lists: Hospitals in Minnesota

M Health Fairview University of Minnesota Medical Center (UMMC) previously known as University of Minnesota Medical Center, is a 1,700-bed non-profit, tertiary, research and academic medical center located in Minneapolis, Minnesota, servicing the entire region. UMMC is the region's only university-level academic medical center. The hospital is operated by the M Health Fairview Health System and the largest hospital in the system. UMMC is affiliated with the University of Minnesota Medical School. UMMC is also an ACS designated level III trauma center. Attached to the medical center is the Masonic Children's Hospital that treats infants, children, adolescents, and young adults up to the age of 21.

There are two campuses: one located on the East Bank of the Mississippi River and the other located on the West Bank. The West Bank campus was previously Saint Mary's Hospital and Fairview-Riverside Medical Center. M Health Fairview University of Minnesota Medical Center is a teaching institution.

== Facilities ==
The 1700-bed M Health Fairview University of Minnesota Medical Center split between the East Bank and West Bank hospitals includes inpatient and outpatient facilities and is connected with six community clinics and many specialty clinics. Services range from "primary care", "emergency care" and the delivery of thousands of babies each year to care of patients. Areas of specialization includes organ and blood and marrow transplantation, neurosciences, pediatrics and behavioral illnesses.

=== Masonic Children's Hospital ===
M Health Fairview University of Minnesota Masonic Children's Hospital (formerly known as Amplatz Children's Hospital) is a non-profit pediatric acute care hospital located in Minneapolis, Minnesota. The hospital has 212 beds and is affiliated with University of Minnesota Medical School. The hospital provides comprehensive pediatric specialties and subspecialties to pediatric patients aged 0–21 throughout Minnesota and midwest United States. Masonic Children's Hospital is also a state designated Level III Trauma Center.

== History ==
The medical center and University of Minnesota Children's Hospital, were created in 1997 as a result of the merger of the University of Minnesota Hospitals and Clinics with Fairview Health Services. In 2014, Children's Hospital was renamed University of Minnesota Masonic Children's Hospital in recognition of the financial support that Minnesota Masonic Charities has given the medical center over the past 60 years. In 2018, the medical center announced a $111 million renovation and expansion project.

The hospital's merger with M Health Fairview was called into question when Fairview planned a merger with Sioux Falls-based Sanford Health. Having the flagship state institution for medical training operated by an out-of-state corporation with its own unranked medical school raised red flags both within the University medical community and the state government. Fairview agreed to spin off the University hospital in 2023, but as of March 18 it was uncertain whether it would be a charitable gift or a sale

The world's first open heart surgery and the first bone marrow transplant were done at the University of Minnesota Medical Center.

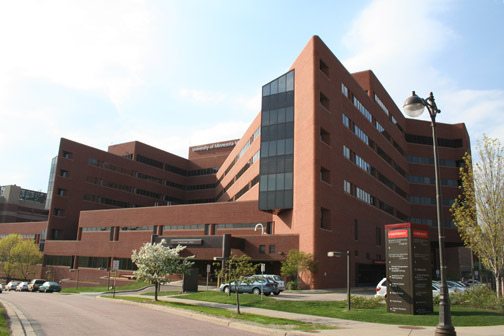
East Bank Hospital, M Health Fairview University of Minnesota Medical Center
