= Sapucaí-Mirim =

Coordinates: 22°44′S 45°45′W

- Municipality
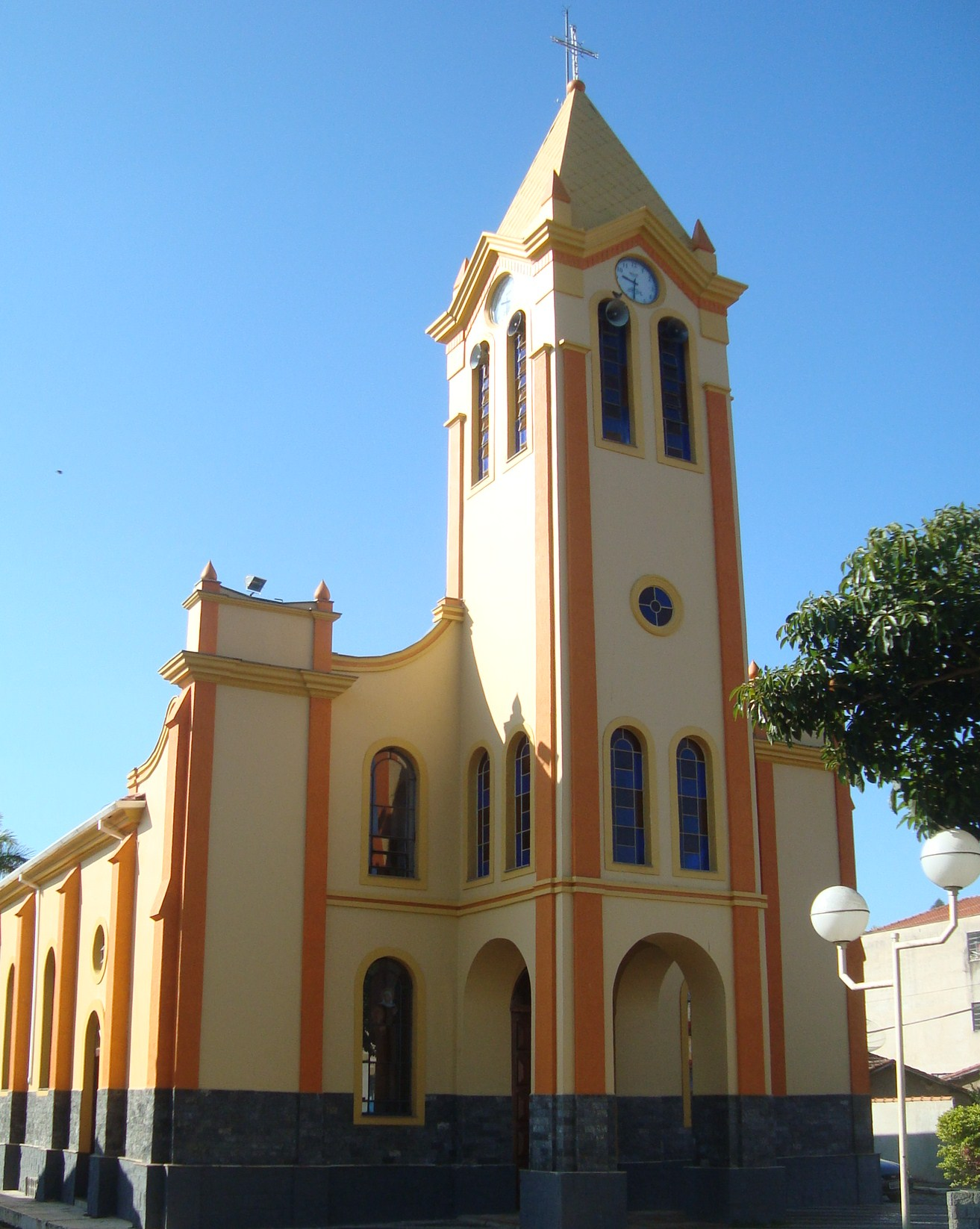
- Saint Anne church in downtown Sapucaí-Mirim

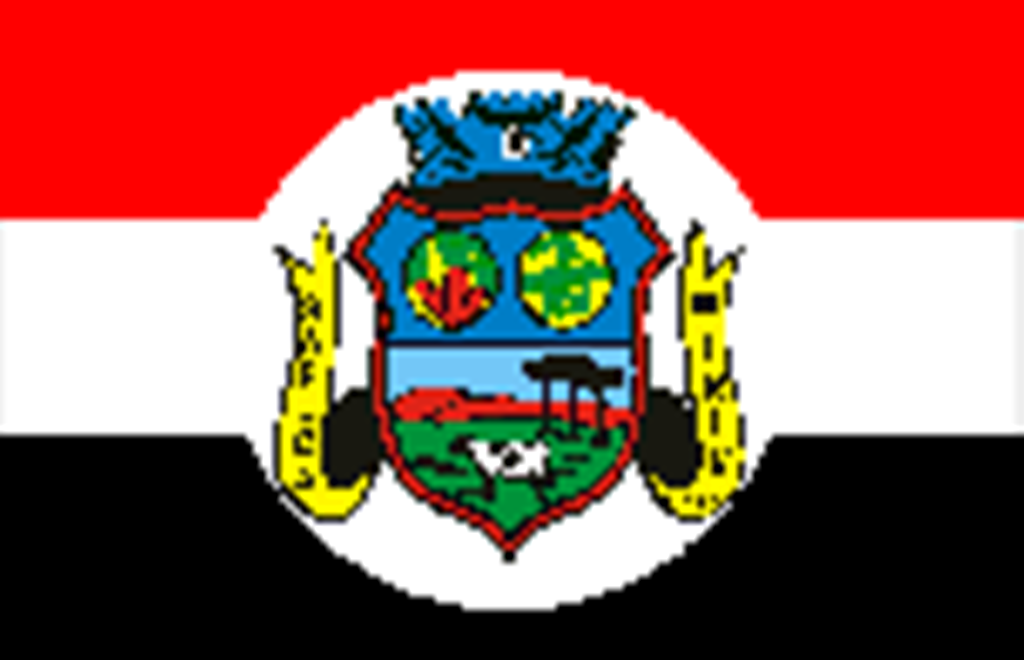
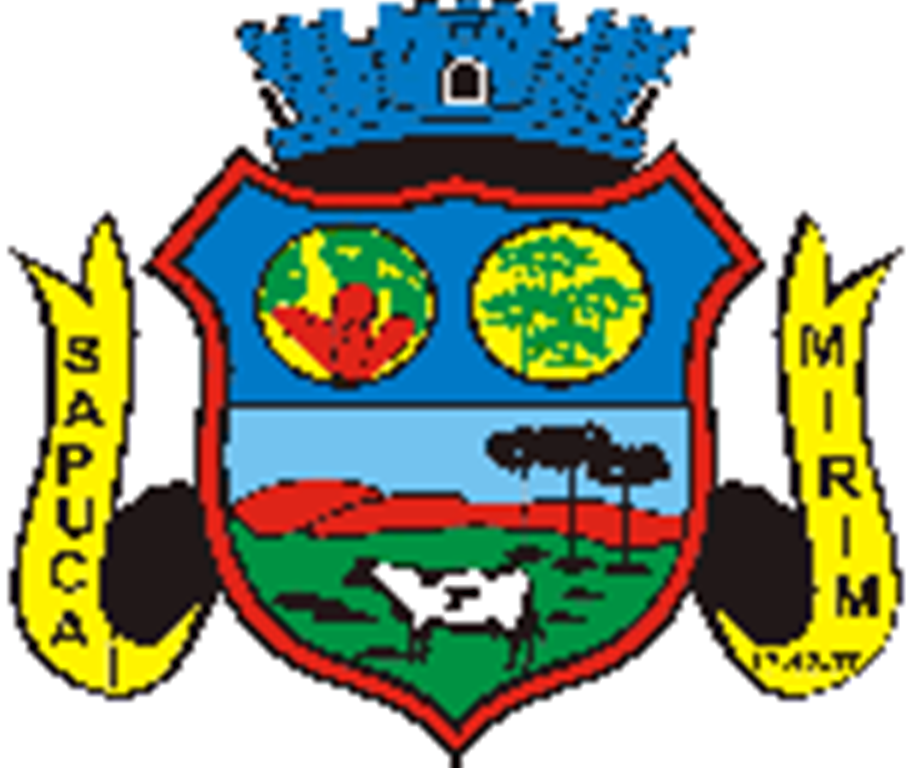
- Flag Coat of arms
- Interactive map of Sapucaí-Mirim
- Country: Brazil
- Region: Southeast
- State: Minas Gerais
- Mesoregion: Sud/Sudoeste de Minas

Population (2020)
  - Total: 6,989
- Time zone: UTC−3 (BRT)

Sapucaí-Mirim is a municipality in the state of Minas Gerais in the Southeast region of Brazil.

The municipality contains part of the 180,373 hectares (445,710 acres) Fernão Dias Environmental Protection Area, created in 1997.

== See also ==
- List of municipalities in Minas Gerais
