= Toledo, Minas Gerais =

Coordinates: 22°44′34″S 46°22′19″W

- Municipality
- Interactive map of Toledo, Minas Gerais
- Country: Brazil
- Region: Southeast
- State: Minas Gerais
- Mesoregion: Sud/Sudoeste de Minas

Population (2020)
  - Total: 6,297
- Time zone: UTC−3 (BRT)

Toledo, Minas Gerais is a municipality in the state of Minas Gerais in the Southeast region of Brazil.

The municipality contains part of the 180,373-hectare (445,710-acre) Fernão Dias Environmental Protection Area, created in 1997.

== See also ==
- List of municipalities in Minas Gerais
