= Extrema, Minas Gerais =

Coordinates: 22°51′18″S 46°19′04″W

Extrema
- Municipality
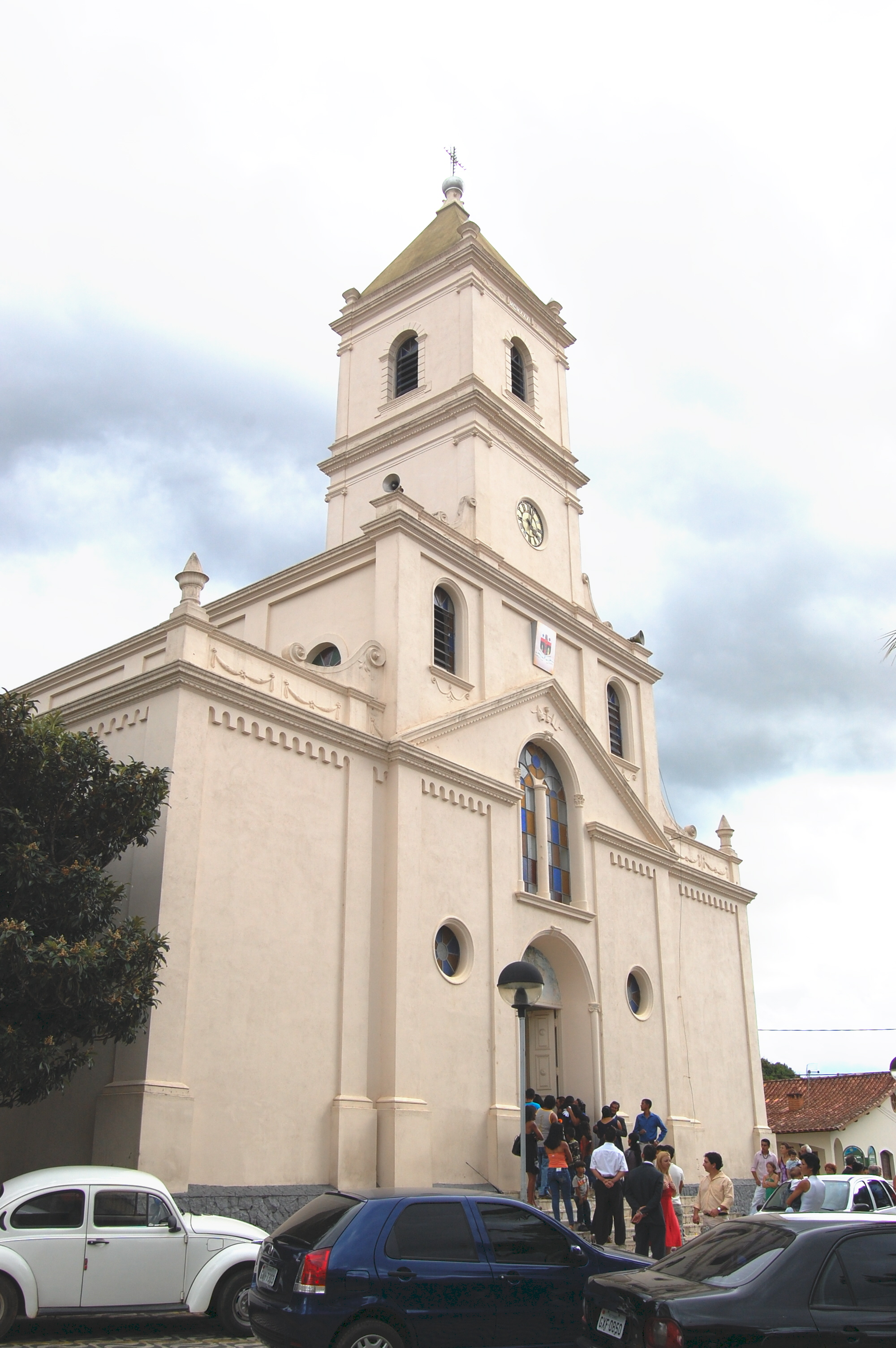

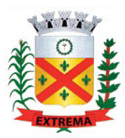
- Flag Coat of arms
- Interactive map of Extrema
- Country: Brazil
- Region: Southeast
- State: Minas Gerais
- Mesoregion: Sud/Sudoeste de Minas

Population (2020)
  - Total: 36,951
- Time zone: UTC−3 (BRT)

Extrema is a municipality in the state of Minas Gerais in the Southeast region of Brazil.

The municipality contains part of the 180,373-hectare (445,710-acre) Fernão Dias Environmental Protection Area, created in 1997.

== History ==
Extrema was discovered on 26 December 1788. It became a municipality on 16 September 1901.

== Climate ==
Extrema is classified as temperate climate (Köppen climate classification: Cfb).

== See also ==
- List of municipalities in Minas Gerais
