= HealthEast Care System =

Former American non-profit health care provider

- Company type: Nonprofit Health Care Provider
- Industry: Health Care
- Founded: 1986
- Defunct: 2019 (became part of M Health Fairview
- Headquarters: St. Paul, Minnesota
- Website: fairview.org

HealthEast Care System was a non-profit health care provider organization located in St. Paul, Minnesota, and the surrounding suburban area. It included four hospitals, 14 clinics, medical transportation and a variety of other outpatient services. Founded in 1986, it was named one of the top ten health care systems in the United States by Thomson Reuters in 2009. In May 2017, it was approved for HealthEast Care System and the Minneapolis-based Fairview Health Services to merge. In October 2019, it officially became part of M Health Fairview.

== Hospitals ==
Former HealthEast hospitals, now M Health Fairview include:

- Bethesda Hospital (a long-term acute care hospital)
- St. John's Hospital
- St. Joseph's Hospital
- Woodwinds Health Campus

== Clinics ==
HealthEast Clinics provide primary and specialty care services and cover the east metro area of St. Paul, Minnesota. Its 14 locations include:

- Cottage Grove
- Downtown St. Paul
- Grand Avenue, St. Paul
- Hugo
- Maplewood
- Midway, St. Paul
- Oakdale
- Rice Street, St. Paul
- Roselawn, St. Paul
- Roseville
- Stillwater
- Tamarack, Woodbury
- Vadnais Heights
- Woodwinds, Woodbury
