= St. Joseph's Hospital (St. Paul, Minnesota) =

St. Joseph’s Hospital
- M Health Fairview
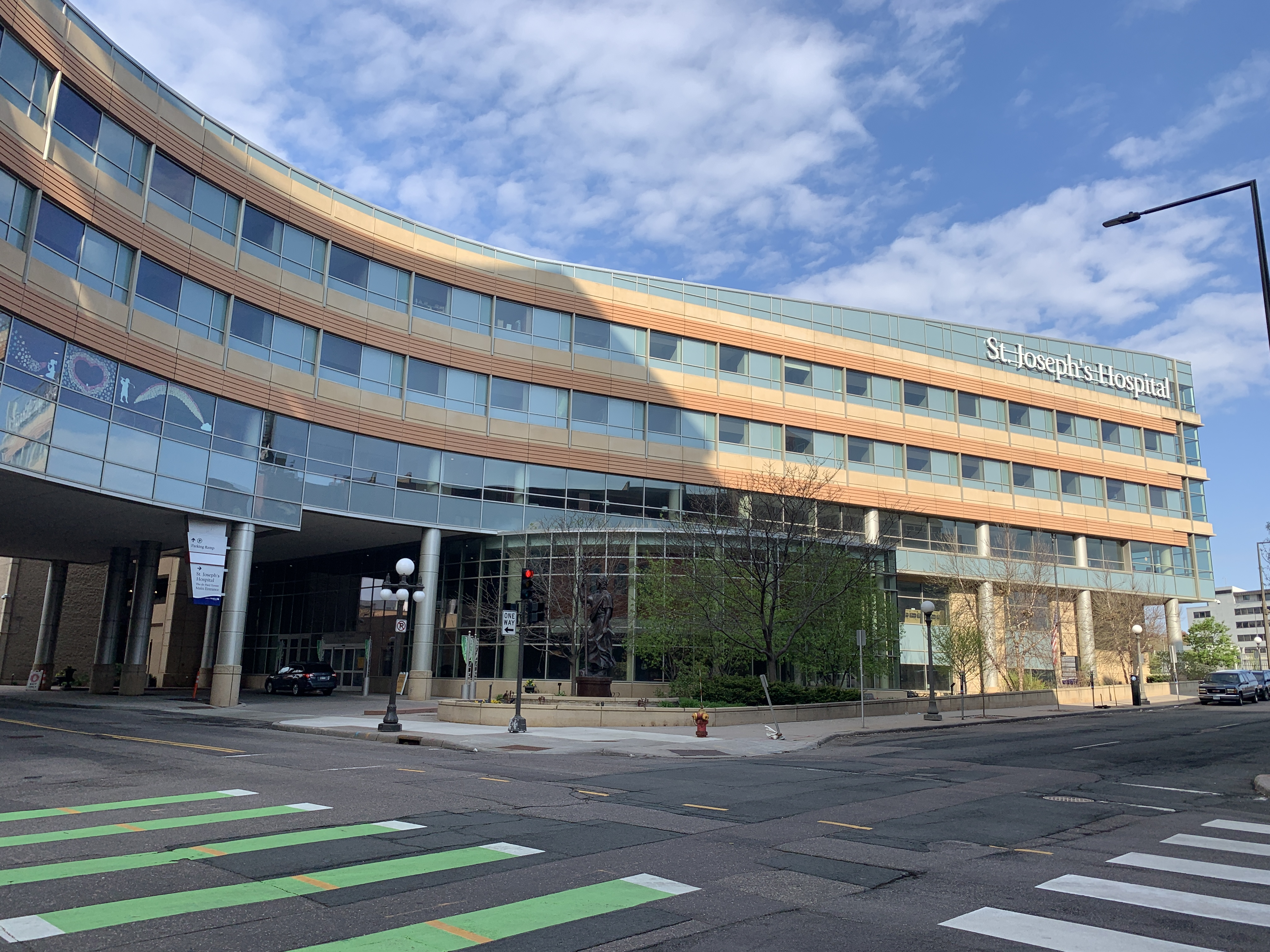

Geography
- Location: 45 West 10th Street, Saint Paul, Minnesota, Minnesota, United States
- Coordinates: 44°56′57″N 93°6′0″W

Organization
- Type: Community Hospital and Tertiary Care
- Affiliated university: University of Minnesota

Services
- Standards: JCAHO certified
- Emergency department: Level IV trauma center
- Beds: 253

History
- Opened: 1853
- Closed: 2020-->

Links
- Website: www.healtheast.org
- Lists: Hospitals in Minnesota

St. Joseph's Hospital was a 253-bed hospital in downtown St. Paul, Minnesota. It was one of three tertiary hospitals located in St. Paul and the oldest hospital in Minnesota. It was part of M Health Fairview. Closed as a hospital in 2020, the building that once housed St. Joseph’s opened as Fairview’s “Center for Community Health Equity”. Fairview announced the hospital would close by year's end in October 2022. All hospital patient care has moved to other locations.

== History ==
St. Joseph's Hospital was founded in 1853 in Saint Paul, Minnesota as Minnesota's first hospital. The Sisters of St. Joseph of Carondelet founded the facility in response to the outbreak of cholera in the community.

St. Joseph's Hospital became one of the founding members of the HealthEast Care System when it was created in 1986.

A significant expansion was completed in 2008 with the opening of the de Paul Tower, a five-story addition to the hospital housing inpatient and outpatient programs, followed in 2010 by a new emergency room. The hospital is a member of the University of Minnesota's Family Medicine and Community Health residency program.

St. Joseph's was a member of the M Health Fairview family of care.

== Care and services ==
Within HealthEast Care System, St. Joseph's Hospital was the center for the cardiac catheterization (cath) lab and open heart surgery. St. Joseph's was named among the nation's “100 Top Hospitals for Cardiac Care”.

The National Brain Aneurysm Center at St. Joseph's Hospital was a regional center that provides diagnostic services and treatment for complex neurovascular conditions, including aneurysms and strokes. The center's work was profiled by WCCO-TV, the CBS affiliate in Minneapolis and St. Paul, during a series in 2008. A survivor of 13 aneurysms began a blog to help other patients after her successful treatment at St. Joseph's.

St. Joseph's was nationally recognized for its low rate of Cesarean section births, an achievement hospital officials attribute to the partnership between physicians and certified nurse-midwives. The Cesarean rate at St. Joseph's is approximately 10 percent, compared to 26 percent in Minnesota and 32 percent in the United States.

== Future and Closing ==
Fairview announced the closure of St. Joseph’s Hospital in October 2020, closing everything except for certain mental health and addiction services, in December of the same year. Fairview also announced the intention to turn the old hospital into the Fairview Community Health & Wellness Hub, described as “a hub for research and wellness programs”.

The Hub will provide “M Fairview Center for Community Health Equity” with additional space, expanding its efforts researching state-wide health disparities and promote new and existing health and wellness programs. Also located at the Wellness Hub will be Minnesota Community Care, offering primary care services like medical, dental, and vision care. They will also help residents find and apply for social services and act as a base for health education in the community. In addition to health care for local residents, a location for senior day programs is also planned. “Food is Medicine”; a group focused on helping the vulnerable find access to food programs and community education on the importance of nutrition also plans to make the old hospital a base of operations.

== Awards ==
St. Joseph's had been named among the nation's “100 Top Hospitals for Cardiac Care.”

== See also ==
- List of the oldest hospitals in the United States
