= Jack Pierce (oilman) =

Canadian oilman (1924–1991)

- Born: 11 February 1924; Westmount, Quebec
- Died: 8 June 1991 (aged 67); Turner Valley, Alberta
- Education: McGill University (BSc '48)
- Spouse: Erna-May Haenni
- Military career
- Branch: Royal Air Force
- Service years: 1943–45
- Unit: No. 45 Group RAF
- Conflicts: World War II

John Michael "Jack" Pierce (22 February 1924 – 8 June 1991) was a Canadian oilman. Pierce was the president and chairman of Ranger Oil, a petroleum exploration and production company based in Calgary. He is known best for co-leading the 1974 discovery of the 1.2 billion barrel Ninian Oil Field in the North Sea. The Pierce Field, in blocks 23/22a and 23/27a of the North Sea, is named in his honour.

== Biography ==
John Michael Pierce was born in Westmount, Quebec on 22 February 1924 to Ashkenazi Jewish parents Richard Moses Pierce (1880–1947) and Flora Elizabeth Asch (1891–1975). Richard Pierce was born in Kaltinėnai, Lithuania, and immigrated with his family to Winnipeg. When the family arrived in Canada, they anglicised their surname from Poyours to Pierce. During World War I, Richard served at the rank of Captain with the 106th Regiment (Winnipeg Light Infantry) as a rifle instructor. After the War, Richard settled in Montreal and ran the Pierce Fur Company. Flora Asch (shortened from Ascherenka) was born in Rotterdam. Richard and Flora married in Montreal in 1918.

Jack graduated from Westmount High School in 1942. He had learnt to fly when he was 15, and during World War II he served in the Royal Air Force as a pilot in 45 Group, RAF Ferry Command. During 1943 and 1944 Pierce lectured in navigation and meteorology for the McGill University Air Training Corps (UATC). Following the War Pierce entered McGill as a student. In 1945 he served as the first McGill Veterans' Liaison Officer and as the McGill delegate at the First National Conference of Student Veterans. That same year he acted as a witness before the Special House of Commons Committee on Veterans' Affairs. In 1948 Pierce graduated Bachelor of Science in geology and economics.

Pierce's first job out of university was with Sun Oil in Beaumont, Texas. He then moved to Tulsa, Oklahoma to work for a small independent oil company. In April 1950 Pierce was one of the founders of Ranger Oil Company Limited in Lusk, Wyoming. Around 1953 Pierce moved to Calgary and in 1954 became the vice president of West Maygill Gas and Oil Limited. West Maygill had been incorporated in Ontario on 21 August 1950 as the Maygill Petroleum Company, and on 13 May 1954 changed its name to West Maygill Gas and Oil Limited. In 1955 Pierce assumed the presidency. In October 1956 West Maygill purchased controlling stock of Ranger from American Leduc Petroleums Limited of New York. Upon the acquisition by Maygill, Pierce was elected a director of Ranger. In 1958 Maygill merged with Ranger and on 5 August 1958 became Ranger Oil (Canada) Limited.

In the early 1970s Pierce partnered with British Petroleum in a North Sea exploration project. In January 1974 the BP-Ranger 3/8-1 well discovered crude in the Ninian Field. The reserves in this field were estimated at 1.2 billion barrels, which equaled a quarter of Canadian domestic conventional reserves. After five years of preparation, production began on 23 December 1978. In 1978 Pierce also assumed the chairmanship of Ranger and held this until his death. He relinquished the presidency in 1985. In 2000 Ranger was acquired by Canadian Natural Resources Limited.

In February 1988 Pierce was made the Honorary Lieutenant Colonel of the Calgary Highlanders. He held this position until his death. Pierce was the founder of the Glenmore Sailing Club and served as its first Commodore. He was a member of several Calgary clubs including the Calgary Petroleum Club, the Ranchmen's Club, and the Glencoe Club.

Pierce was married to Erna-May Haenni. They had five children: Richard, Michael, Caroline, Andrea, and Robert. For many years Pierce lived on the Turner Valley Ranch (now White Moose Ranch) in Turner Valley and flew his plane into the city to work. On 8 June 1991 Pierce died at age 67 while on a cattle round-up. A memorial service for Pierce was held on 17 June at Mewata Armoury by the Highlanders. Pierce was buried with his parents in the Shaar Hashomayim Cemetery in Outremont.
