= John Hepfer =

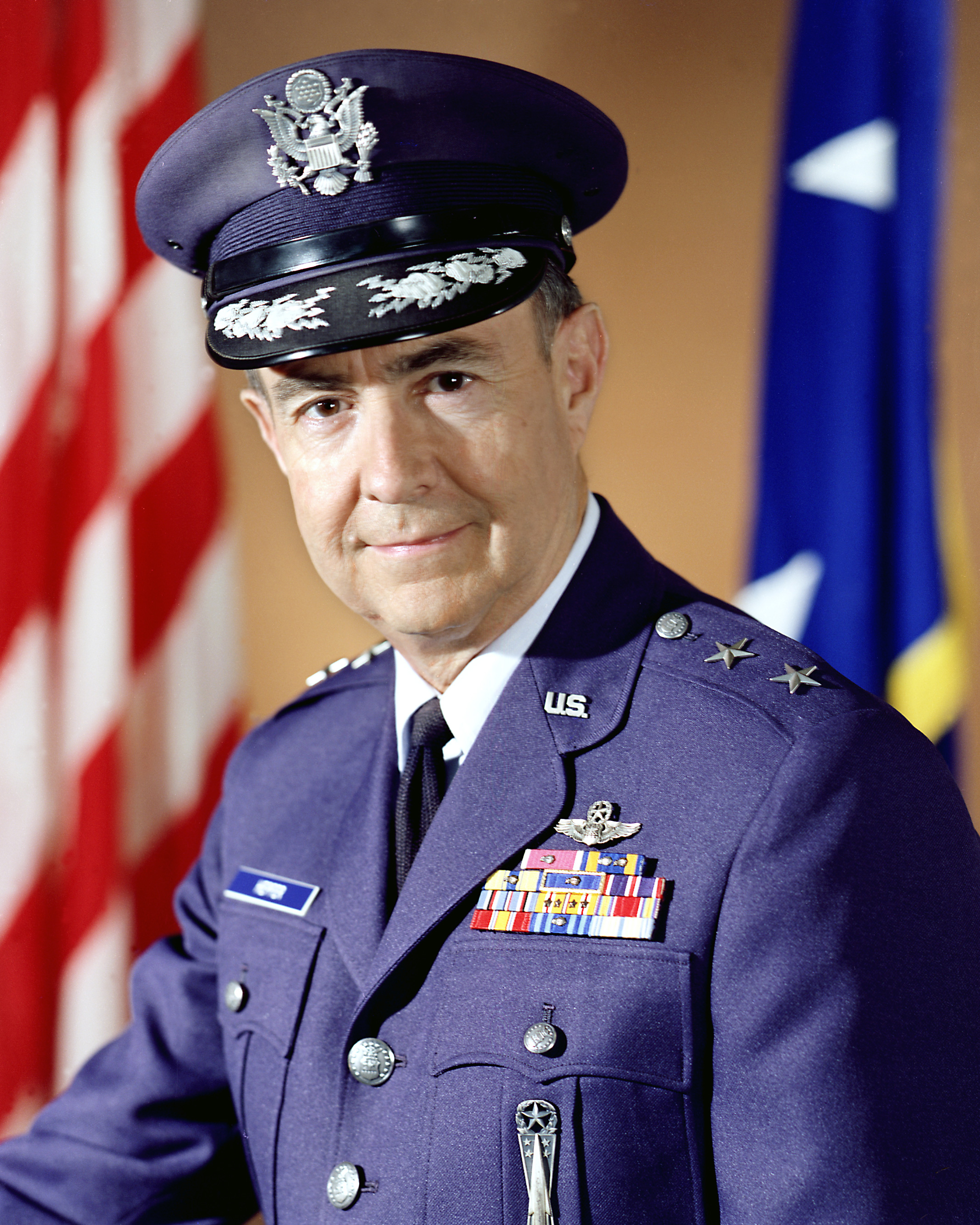
- Born: 9 February 1924; Waynesboro, Pennsylvania, US
- Died: 25 April 1997 (aged 73); Punta Gorda, Florida, US
- Burial place: Florida National Cemetery
- Military career
- Allegiance: United States
- Branch: United States Army (1942–1945); United States Air Force (1950–1980)
- Service years: 1942–1945, 1950–1980
- Rank: Major General
- Commands: Rome Air Development Center
- Conflicts: World War II; Southwest Pacific Area; Korean War; Vietnam War
- Awards: Defense Distinguished Service Medal; Air Force Distinguished Service Medal; Legion of Merit (2); Air Medal (7); Air Force Commendation Medal

John William Hepfer (9 February 1924 – 25 April 1997) was a leading missile development engineer who played an important role in the development of the Minuteman and Peacekeeper missiles. During World War II he flew 44 combat missions in the Southwest Pacific Area as a navigator of Consolidated B-24 Liberator bombers. He left the Army after the war but was recalled to active duty during the Korean War. From 1962 to 1965 he worked on the development of aircraft systems at the Air Research and Development Command (ARDC). After working on the design of the McNamara Line at the Defense Communications Agency during the Vietnam War, he was transferred to the Space and Missile Systems Organization (SAMSO) in June 1967, where he worked in the Systems Project Office for the Minuteman missile as the chief of guidance and control, and then as the deputy chief of engineering for systems. After a period in command of the Rome Air Development Center, he returned to SAMSO in 1974, and was in change of the guidance and navigation of the Peacekeeper missile.

== Early life ==
John William Hepfer was born in Waynesboro, Pennsylvania, on 9 February 1924, the son of John William and Alice Holtzman Hepfer. He had a sister, Arlene. He graduated from Waynesboro Area Senior High School in 1942, and married Janet L. Miller, a fellow member of his high school class. They had two sons, John William Hepfer III and Stephen Hepfer and two grandchildren Tori Hepfer and John “Jay” William Hepfer IV.

== World War II ==
On 30 July 1942, during World War II, Hepfer enlisted in the United States Army Air Corps, and he was commissioned as a second lieutenant through the wartime Aviation Cadet Training Program. He flew 44 combat missions as a navigator of Consolidated B-24 Liberator bombers the Southwest Pacific Area, for which he was awarded the Air Medal with six oak leaf clusters.

== Korean War ==
After the war ended, he left the Army and resumed his education, earning a Bachelor of Arts degree in mathematics and physics from Bridgewater College in Virginia in 1950. That year he was recalled to active duty in the United States Air Force (USAF) due to the outbreak of the Korean War. He attended a refresher course for navigators at Ellington Air Force Base in Texas and then one in radar at Mather Air Force Base in California. He was then assigned to Randolph Air Force Base in Texas as an instructor for Boeing B-29 Superfortress crews.

In 1952, Hepfer was selected to attend the Air Force Institute of Technology at Wright-Patterson Air Force Base in Ohio, where he earned a Bachelor of Science degree in electrical engineering. After graduating in 1953, he stayed on at Wright, where he worked in the Communications and Navigation Laboratory on Doppler radars, automatic star trackers and inertial guidance systems, and he was the project officer for the guidance and control system of the Navaho cruise missile.

== Missiles ==
In June 1957, Hepfer was assigned to the Air Research and Development Command (ARDC) at Andrews Air Force Base in Maryland, where he was an assistant for bombing, fire control and navigation systems. ARDC was merged with the Air Materiel Command In April 1961 to become the Air Force Systems Command (AFSC), and all research and development activities were consolidated under it. From October 1962 to mid-1965, Hepfer was the program manager for bombing, fire control and navigation systems in the AFSC's Research and Technology Division at Bolling Air Force Base in Washington, DC.

Hepfer was assigned to the Institute for Defense Analysis in Arlington, Virginia in August 1965, and he earned a Master of Arts degree in quantitative analysis at the University of Maryland in 1966. From 1966 to mid-1967, he was part of the Defense Communications Planning Group, a joint task force under the Defense Communications Agency charged with building the McNamara Line, a barrier of electronic sensors stretching across the Demilitarized Zone in the Republic of Vietnam during the Vietnam War.

In June 1967 Hepfer went to the Space and Missile Systems Organization (SAMSO), where he worked in the Systems Project Office for the Minuteman missile at Norton Air Force Base in California as the chief of guidance and control, and then as the deputy chief of engineering for systems. He graduated from the Harvard Business School's program for management development. He attended the Air War College at Maxwell Air Force Base in Alabama from August 1970 to June 1971. He then served as the assistant deputy chief of staff for systems at AFSC Headquarters until September 1973, when he assumed command of the Rome Air Development Center at Griffiss Air Force Base in New York. His final assignment, in January 1974, was at Norton Air Force Base as the deputy for intercontinental ballistic missiles at SAMSO, which was renamed was redesignated the Ballistic Missile Office on 1 October. He was promoted to major general on 1 July 1974, with seniority backdated to 1 May 1974. In this role he oversaw the design and development of the Peacekeeper missile, and is regarded by many as the "father" of the missile.

Hepfer retired from the USAF on 1 November 1980. He was the 1977 recipient of the Bernard Schriever Award, which honors excellence in military space operations and acquisition. His military decorations included the Defense Distinguished Service Medal, the Air Force Distinguished Service Medal, the Legion of Merit with oak leaf cluster, Air Medal with six oak leaf clusters and Air Force Commendation Medal with oak leaf cluster.

== Death ==
Hepfer died at the Charlotte Regional Medical Center in Punta Gorda, Florida, on 25 April 1997. He was accorded a funeral with full military honors at MacDill Air Force Base in Florida, and buried in Florida National Cemetery.
