= Carlos Gonzaga =

Brazilian singer (1924–2023)

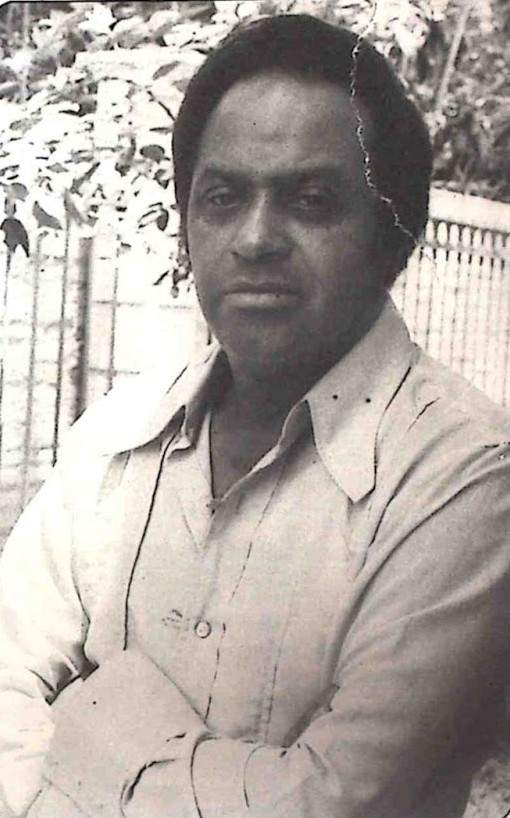
- Gonzaga in 1976

Background information
- Born: José Gonzaga Ferreira; 10 February 1924; Paraisópolis, Minas Gerais, Brazil
- Died: 25 August 2023 (aged 99) Velletri, Italy
- Genres: Rock and roll; Ballad; Pop; Country music
- Occupation: Singer
- Instrument: Voice
- Years active: 1958–20??
- Labels: RCA; BMG; Sony Music

José Gonzaga Ferreira (10 February 1924 – 25 August 2023), better known as Carlos Gonzaga, was a Brazilian singer who had national success with the 1958 version of the song "Diana".

== Life and career ==
José Gonzaga Ferreira was born on 10 February 1924 in the city of Paraisópolis, in the south of Minas Gerais, where he lived with his family throughout his childhood and adolescence. He started working early where the activity he liked to do most was carry the bags of travelers arriving in the city, from the train station to the central hotel.

In early adulthood he looked for better job opportunities in larger cities in the Paraíba Valley, such as Itajubá, Campos do Jordão, and São José dos Campos. At the end of the 1940s, he decided to move to the central region of the city of São Paulo. He settled down without many resources in the Cambuci region where he worked in a company that manufactures chairs for salons and barbershops. Despite having made some amateur musical performances in his childhood and adolescence in his hometown, it was in the city of São Paulo that he participated for the first time in a freshman program.

Encouraged by colleagues and acquaintances who were impressed with his vocal tuning, he continued to participate in freshman programs, having won first place in competitions several times. His victories began to draw attention and at that time he managed to be hired as a regular singer on Rádio Tupi in São Paulo. His recordings of versions of the songs "Oh! Carol", "Bat Masterson" and "Cavaleiros do Céu" were also successful. He resided in the city of Santo André in the state of São Paulo from the 1980s on.

Carlos Gonzaga died on 25 August 2023, at the age of 99.

== Discography ==
- Quisera Te Dizer (1958 - RCA Victor - 10", Album)
- Meu Coração Canta (1959 - RCA Victor - LP)
- Carlos Gonzaga - Diana (1959 - RCA Victor - LP)
- The Best Seller (1960 - RCA Victor - LP)
- Carlos Gonzaga Canta (1961 - RCA Victor - 10", LP)
- Carlos Gonzaga Canta vr. Digital (2002 - RCA, BMG, Brasil - CD, Album, RE, RM)
- És Tudo Para Mim (1961 - RCA Victor - LP)
- O Cantor "Hit Parade" (1962 - RCA Victor - LP)
- Para a Juventude (1963 - RCA Victor - LP)
- Hully Gully (1964 - Philips - LP)
- Os Grandes Sucessos de Carlos Gonzaga (1967 - RCA Camden - LP)
- Rapaz Solitário (1968 - RCA Victor - LP)
- Eu Só Canto Sucessos (1970 - RCA Camden - LP)
- Os Grandes Sucessos de Carlos Gonzaga vol. II (1972 - RCA Camden - LP)
- Nelson Gonçalves, Alda Perdigão, Carlos Gonzaga, Núbia Lafayette – Brasil Canta (1974 - RCA Victor - LP)
- Os Sucessos de Paul Anka e Neil Sedaka com Carlos Gonzaga (1975 - RCA Camden - LP)
- Sempre Sucesso (1977 - RCA Camden - LP)
- Sucessos de Carlos Gonzaga (1984- Arara - LP)
- Meu Eterno Querer (1985- Polydisc - LP)
- Sempre Sucesso (1989 - Polydisc - LP)
- Série Popular Brasileira (1993 - RCA - LP, CD)
- 20 Supersucessos (1997 - Philips - CD)
- Grandes Sucessosː Carlos Gonzaga (2000 - Philips - CD)
- Grandes Sucessos (2005 - RCA, Sony BMG Music Entertainment - CD)
