= Itapeva (Minas Gerais) =

- Municipality
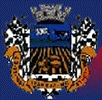
- Coat of arms

- Location in Minas Gerais state

- Location in Brazil
- Coordinates: 22°46′4″S 46°13′15″W
- Country: Brazil
- Region: Southeast
- State: Minas Gerais

Area
  - Total: 177 km^{2} (68 sq mi)

Population (2020)
  - Total: 9,881
  - Density: 55.8/km^{2} (145/sq mi)
- Time zone: UTC−3 (BRT)

Itapeva is a municipality in the state of Minas Gerais in Brazil. The population is 9,881 (2020 est.) in an area of 177 km^{2} (68 sq mi).

The municipality contains part of the 180,373-hectare (445,710-acre) Fernão Dias Environmental Protection Area, created in 1997.

== See also ==
- List of municipalities in Minas Gerais
