= Ranger Oil =

Canadian petroleum company (1950–2000)

Ranger Oil Limited
- Formerly: Maygill Petroleum Company Limited (1950–54); West Maygill Gas and Oil Limited (1954–58); Ranger Oil (Canada) Limited (1958–80)
- Traded as: TSX: RGO
- Industry: Petroleum
- Founded: 21 August 1950
- Defunct: 25 September 2000
- Fate: Acquired by Canadian Natural Resources
- Headquarters: Calgary, Alberta

Ranger Oil Limited was a Canadian independent petroleum company that operated between 1950 and 2000. Ranger was founded as the Maygill Petroleum Company Limited with the aim to develop oil leases in the Steveville, Alberta area. In 1954, Jack Piece (1924–1991), originally of Montreal, acquired control of the company and renamed it West Maygill Gas and Oil Limited. In 1956, Maygill purchased an American company Pierce had founded, the Ranger Oil Company, and in 1958 renamed itself Ranger Oil (Canada) Limited. Over the subsequent decades, Pierce built Ranger into one of Canada's most successful independent producers. During the 1970s and 1980s, Ranger played an active role in the development of the North Sea. In 2000, Canadian Natural Resources acquired Ranger.

== History ==
=== Formation ===
==== Maygill Petroleum ====
Ranger Oil's history began on 31 December 1948 when Orville V. Birkinshaw, Arthur Desilets, and Arthur Weich took out a petroleum license on Reservation No. 739 in near Steveville, Alberta. Initially, the trio had intended to acquire a lease on land near Wardlow, but Minister of Lands and Mines N. Eldon Tanner convinced them otherwise. In 1950, James William Maynard befriended the three men and acquired a 25 percent stake in the reservation. Maynard then partnered with Herbert Hyman Gillespie (1903–1992) to form a new company to manage the holding of Reservation 739 as well as Maynard's other properties in Red Deer, Turner Valley, Leduc, and Crossfield. On 21 August 1950 they incorporated Maygill Petroleum Company Limited. Simultaneously, Desilets and Weich formed Matlo Oils Limited to manage their share; Birkinshaw was also an officer of this company. In September 1950 the Maygill and Matlo sold a 50 percent interest in the lease to Sweetgrass Oil Company. On 12 January 1951, the Sweetgrass Maygill No. 1 will was spudded. In March a second well, No. 1A, was drilled 100 feet to the west and found gas.

==== Ranger Oil Company (Wyoming) ====
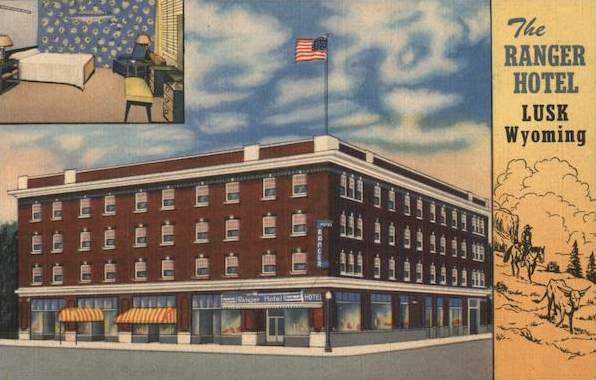
The Ranger Hotel in Lusk, Wyoming was the company's namesake.

On 12 April 1950, the Ranger Oil Company formed as a Wyoming corporation with a capitalisation of $100,000. Directors of the new company were Jack M. Pierce, John W. Agnew, William D. Miller, Roy Armstrong, and Edward S. Halsey, all of Lusk, Wyoming. The company was named after the Ranger Hotel on Main Street, Lusk, which was visible from the office where the founders met. Over the ensuing years Ranger acquired substantial holdings in Niobrara County and Converse County.

=== Pierce gains control ===
At Maygill's 1954 Annual General Meeting, held of 8 March at the Royal York Hotel in Toronto, Jack M. Pierce was elected to the board of directors. At some point in the early 1950s Pierce had moved to Calgary after having worked in the United States since 1948. The following month, on 13 April, Pierce submitted a proposal to the board whereby he would trade his working interest in 1,160 acres in Wyoming for 415,000 Maygill shares along with an issue of share warrants due one year from the date of issue. Pierce also proposed the company change its name and increase the number of directors to the maximum of 11. The following day the board moved to accept Pierce's proposals. Chairman of the Board O. V. Birkinshaw also proposed to consolidate the company's 3,180,000 shares into 318,000, and put forth the new name West Maygill Gas and Oil Limited. At a shareholder meeting in May, all proposals were written into the company's bylaws. In December 1954, Burkinshaw resigned as president, but stayed with the company as secretary-treasurer. George von Brevern, a Toronto economist, was appointed president. Brevern remained in the position only until July 1955, when the board appointed Pierce president. By the end of 1955, West Maygill had 24 producing wells.

In October 1956, Maygill announced that it had acquired control of the Ranger Oil Company from American Leduc Petroleums Limited of New York City. Ranger thus became an American subsidiary of Maygill. Following the takeover, Jack M. Pierce, Roy Chamberlain, John W. Agnew, J. D. Mason, and Dr Peter C. Badgley were elected directors.

At the 1958 Annual General Meeting, held on Thursday 26 June in Calgary, shareholders voted unanimously to change West Maygill's name to Ranger Oil (Canada) Limited. The change came into effect on 5 August of that year, while the trading name changed on 10 September. The new name did not entail any corporate changes.

=== Development and growth ===
==== Canada ====
In the 1960s Ranger acquired lands in three major producing areas. In 1964 it partnered with a group of companies to acquire four parcels in the Mitsue field, and in 1966 joined Wainoco Oil Company to acquire land in South Rainbow. Later, in 1968, it acquired holdings in the Zama field.

Through the 1970s Ranger acquired production in Viking-Kinsella, Hawkins, Edson, and Rich-Fenn. The company drilled 60 wells, 40 of which produced gas, and one of which produced oil. In 1977 Ranger began exploration in Suffield, Elmworth, Pembina West, Poco Verger, and Gold River (all in Alberta), and Gopher, Wolf, and Osbamet in British Columbia. Ranger drilled 239 wells, 90 of which produced gas and 33 of which produced oil. In 1985 Ranger added to its reserves through the acquisition of Jorcan Exploration Limited. In 1989 the company purchased a 36 percent interest in the Sikanni gas field, acquired the company Propetro, and acquired from Petro-Canada interests in Mitsui and Lobstick properties. Between 1975 and 1982 Ranger participated in coal and uranium production in British Columbia.

==== North Sea ====
In 1958 the United Nations finalised the Convention on the Continental Shelf, and in 1964 it was ratified by 22 countries. The convention divided ownership of the North Sea among seven countries. Subsequently, the United Kingdom passed the Continental Shelf Act 1964, which allowed for the commencement of mineral development in the North Sea. That year, in the first round of awards, Ranger bid on five blocks but was unsuccessful. During the bidding process, Pierce formed a relationship with a London broker named Michael Belmont who worked for the firm Cazenove. Their relationship led to the creation of Scottish Canadian Oil Transportation Limited (SCOT), which was incorporated on 15 January 1970. Any further North Sea applications by Ranger, if successful, would be held by Ranger (40 percent), SCOT (45 percent), and International Utilities Limited (15 percent).

In May 1970, the Ranger-SCOT group bid on 12 blocks as part of the third round of awards. That June, the group won licenses for four blocks: 22/19, 22/27, 23/11, and 23/27. In the fourth round, a new company joined SCOT in the group. The London and Scottish Marine Oil Company Limited (LASMO) was incorporated on 23 April 1971 to allow new investors into the project. During the fourth round of bidding, Ranger-SCOT-LASMO partnered with British Petroleum in a joint bid on blocks 3/3, 3/8, 211/16, and 9/27. It also had bidding partnerships with Canadian Pacific Oil and Gas Limited and Invent Oil Company. When the results were announced in February 1972, several Ranger bids were successful, including block 3/8 with BP.

Ranger began drilling test wells in the fall of 1972 in the various blocks it had been awarded. In early January 1974 the semi-submersible drilling rig Sea Quest discovered oil in the Ranger-BP block 3/8 at a depth of 10,572 feet. Shortly thereafter, the Burmah-Chevron group discovered oil in the adjoining block, 3/3, indicating a major field. BP named the field Ninian after the Scottish saint Ninian. Soon, the two groups joined to plan the development of the field. Ranger's share in the consortium stood at 5.192 percent. Two platforms, Ninian Central and Ninian Southern would be located in 3/3, while Ninian Northern would be in 3/8. A new 36 inch pipeline, laid by Viking Piper, would connect the field to the newly constructed Sullum Voe Terminal in the Shetland Islands. Construction of the system began in May 1975 and testing began in 1976. Production on from Ninian Southern began on 23 December 1978 and Ninian Central in April 1979. In 1988 Ranger acquired another 5.75 percent interest in Ninian from BP, and in 1996 another 8.3 percent.

==== International ====
Beginning in the 1960s Ranger explored the potential of international production. In 1969 it explored projects in Indonesia and Abu Dhabi, but abandoned both endeavours. A decade later Ranger embarked on several international projects, most of which were unsuccessful. In 1978 the company joined a project led by British Petroleum to explore in the South China Sea and Yellow Sea. In 1984 and 1985 the group drilled 14 wells, only six of which produced oil, and only at non-commercial levels. Ranger abandoned the project in 1985. Between 1981 and 1985 Ranger participated in several projects in Australia, including offshore in the North West Shelf and in several properties in Western Australia. In November 1985 it sold all of its Australian interests. Between 1981 and 1983 it participated in two wells in Guyana, and between 1985 and 1989 explored in Pakistan's Badin region. In 1978 Ranger also considered exploration in Chile and Columbia but abandoned the project. The early 1990s saw participate in projects in Algeria, Angola, and Namibia.

=== Later years ===
On 12 June 1980, Ranger Oil (Canada) Limited was continued as Ranger Oil Limited, the name it used for the duration of its existence. In 1985, burdened by his responsibilities with the company, Jack Pierce ceded the presidency to Gordon H. Bowman, while retaining the chairmanship. On 8 June 1991, while at his ranch in Turner Valley, Pierce suffered a heart attack and died at age 67. The newly elected chairman was S. Simon Reisman, who had been a chief negotiator in the 1987 Canada–United States Free Trade Agreement. At the same time, the board appointed Frederick J. Dyment the new president. Major acquisitions in the 1990s included MLC Oil and Gas Limited and Czar Resources Limited. By 1993, 50 percent of Ranger's production was domestic. In the late 1990s Ranger purchased Elan Energy Incorporated for $517 million. Elan, a pioneer of the steam assisted gravity drainage (SAGD) method, allowed Ranger to enter the heavy oil business.

=== Takeover by Canadian Natural Resources ===
In the late 1990s, Ranger's stock price was undervalued compared to its asset value. On 5 April 2000, the company announced its intention to sell. The following day, Petrobank Energy and Resources Limited, also of Calgary, released a $1.6 billion plan to take over Ranger that was financed by Barclays plc. Per the plan, Petrobank offered three of its own shares per Ranger share, or $2.50 plus two of its own shares per Ranger share. Additionally, Petrobank would also assume $412 million of Ranger debt. Ranger's president, Fred Dyment, was dismayed by the hostile takeover bid, calling it "a highly leveraged reverse takeover, offering illiquid equity from an entity with a market capitalisation of only $86 million and does not maximise value for Ranger's shareholders." In late April, Ranger filed lawsuits in New York, Alberta, Ontario, and Quebec to halt the offer from proceeding. During the lawsuits, Ranger continued to look for another buyer and opened its data rooms to interested parties. However, it barred Petrobank access, which set of another round of lawsuits.

In May, Canadian Natural Resources Limited, under the leadership of president John G. Langille, stepped forward to act as a white knight in the face of Petrobank's hostile takeover. On 29 May, CNRL entered a confidentiality agreement with Ranger and in early June entered the company's data room. On 14 June the companies signed a pre-acquisition agreement, at which time Ranger stopped discussions with other companies. On 19 June CNRL released its acquisition proposal, which offered $8.25 per Ranger share, or 0.175 CNRL shares per Ranger share. Ranger's directors recommended its shareholders accept the deal, which they did. By the fall of 2000, Ranger's operations were merged into CNRL.

== Leadership ==
=== President ===
1. Herbert H. Gillespie, 1950–1952
2. Orville V. Birkinshaw, 1952–1954
3. George von Brevern, 1954–1955
4. Jack Michael Pierce, 1955–1985
5. Gordon H. Bowman, 1985–1991
6. Frederick John Dyment, 1991–2000

=== Chairman of the Board ===
1. Jack Michael Pierce, 1978–1991
2. Sol Simon Reisman, 1991–2000

== Bibliography ==
- Penner, David G. The Story of Ranger Oil. Calgary: GRP Enterprises, 2004.
