= 1924 Swiss employment protection referendum =

Referendum in Switzerland

- 17 February 1924
- Federal Law amending Art. 41 of the Factory Law of 18 June 1914/27 June 1919

Results
Choice	Votes	%
Yes	320,668	42.37%
No	436,180	57.63%
Valid votes	756,848	98.74%
Invalid or blank votes	9,657	1.26%
Total votes	766,505	100.00%
Registered voters/turnout	995,663	76.98%

A referendum on employment protection was held in Switzerland on 17 February 1924. Voters were asked whether they approved of an amendment to the federal employment protection law. The proposal was rejected by 57.6% of voters.

== Background ==
The referendum was an optional referendum, which only a majority of the vote, as opposed to the mandatory referendums, which required a double majority; a majority of the popular vote and majority of the cantons.

== Results ==
Choice	Votes	%
For	320,668	42.4
Against	436,180	57.6
Blank votes	7,676	–
Invalid votes	1,981	–
Total	766,505	100
Registered voters/turnout	995,663	77.0
Source: Nohlen & Stöver
