= Kurt Amplatz =

Austrian radiologist and inventor (1924–2019)

- Born: Kurt Anton Amplatz; February 25, 1924; Weistrach, Austria
- Died: November 6, 2019 (aged 95); Minneapolis, Minnesota
- Education: University of Innsbruck
- Occupation: Radiologist
- Known for: Amplatzer Cribriform Occluder; Amplatzer Septal Occluder
- Spouse: Maxine

Kurt Anton Amplatz (February 25, 1924 – November 6, 2019) was an Austrian radiologist and medical device inventor. He is best known for the invention of the Amplatzer Septal Occluder as well as the Amplatzer Cribriform Occluder, which is used for closing atrial septal defect, a common congenital heart defects found in infants. These devices are inserted by percutaneous catheter placement, thus avoiding open heart surgery. In 1958, he performed one of the first percutaneous catheterizations of the heart. Amplatz spent most of his 40-year career in Radiology as the Chairman of Interventional Radiology at the University of Minnesota.

== Early life and education ==
Kurt Amplatz was born on February 25, 1924, in Weistrach, Austria. He was raised in Senftenberg and later in Innsbruck. He attended the University of Innsbruck, graduating with a medical degree in 1951. He interned at the Universitätsklinikum St. Pölten and at St. John's Hospital in Brooklyn. He completed his postgraduate work in radiology at Wayne State University School of Medicine in Detroit.

== Medical career ==
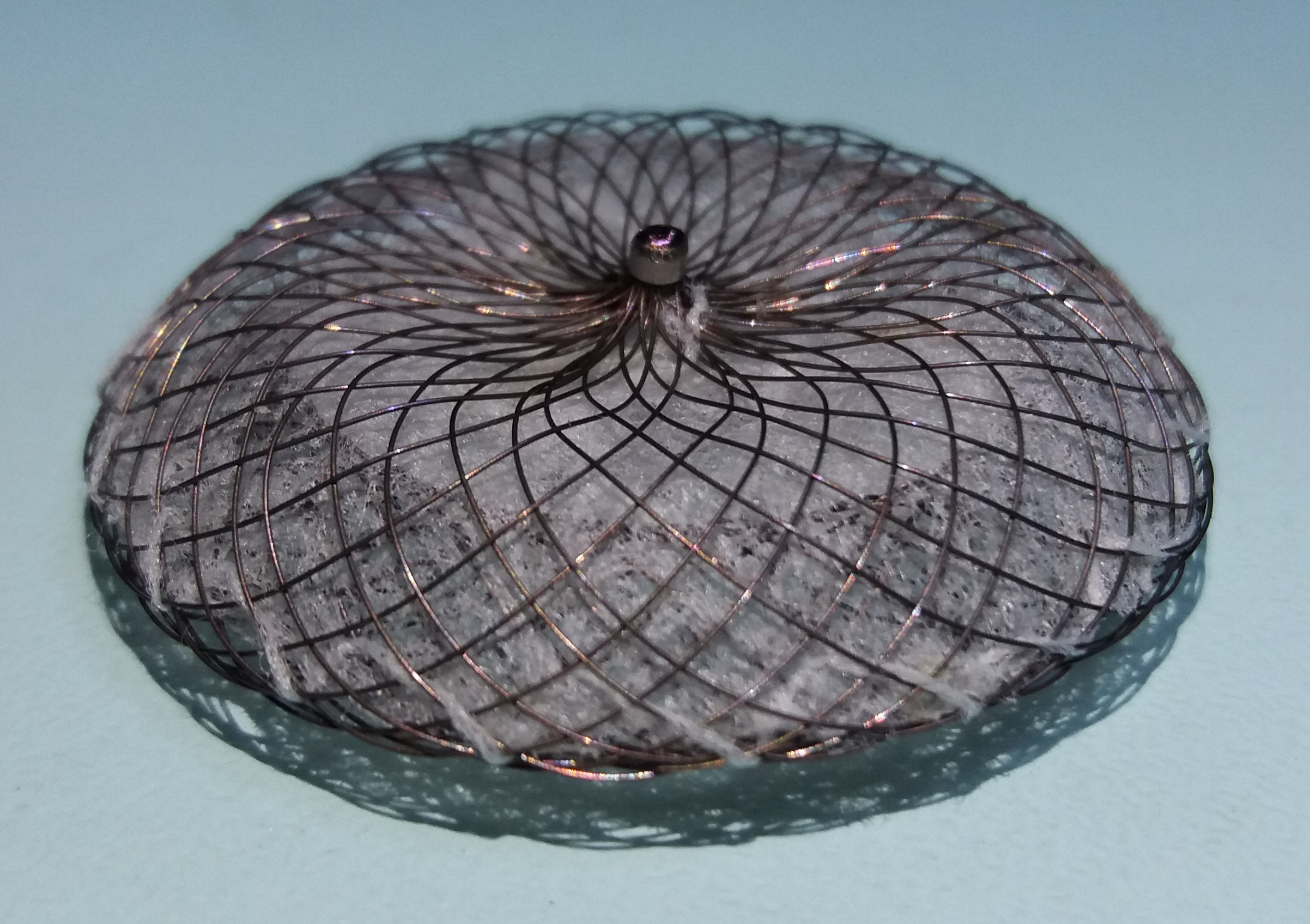
The Amplatzer Septal Occluder is a device specifically designed to close an ASD

In 1957, he began working at the radiology faculty of the University of Minnesota Medical School. There he developed a device that allowed physicians to inject dye into the heart via a catheter. He also built a chair for use in pneumoencephalography for detection of brain tumors before CT scans. With his son, Curtis, he developed the Amplatzer Occluder, which introduced a mesh via a catheter that could close holes in the heart.

Before retiring from the University of Minnesota in 1997, he formed his own company, AGA Medical. AGA designed and sold small devices that could close defects in the heart. Amplatz sold one third of the company to two partners, which ultimately led to internal conflict. Lawsuits between the partners resulted in a bidding process in which a private equity investor, Welsh, Carson, Anderson & Stowe, acquired more than half of the company. The company was sold to St. Jude Medical in 2010 for more than $1 billion.

Before leaving the company, Amplatz had accumulated more than 100 patents. He donated $1 million worth of his occluders to poor patients.

== Personal life ==
He was married to Maxine Amplatz and had four children.

Dr. Amplatz died on November 6, 2019, at the age of 95.
