= Weistrach =

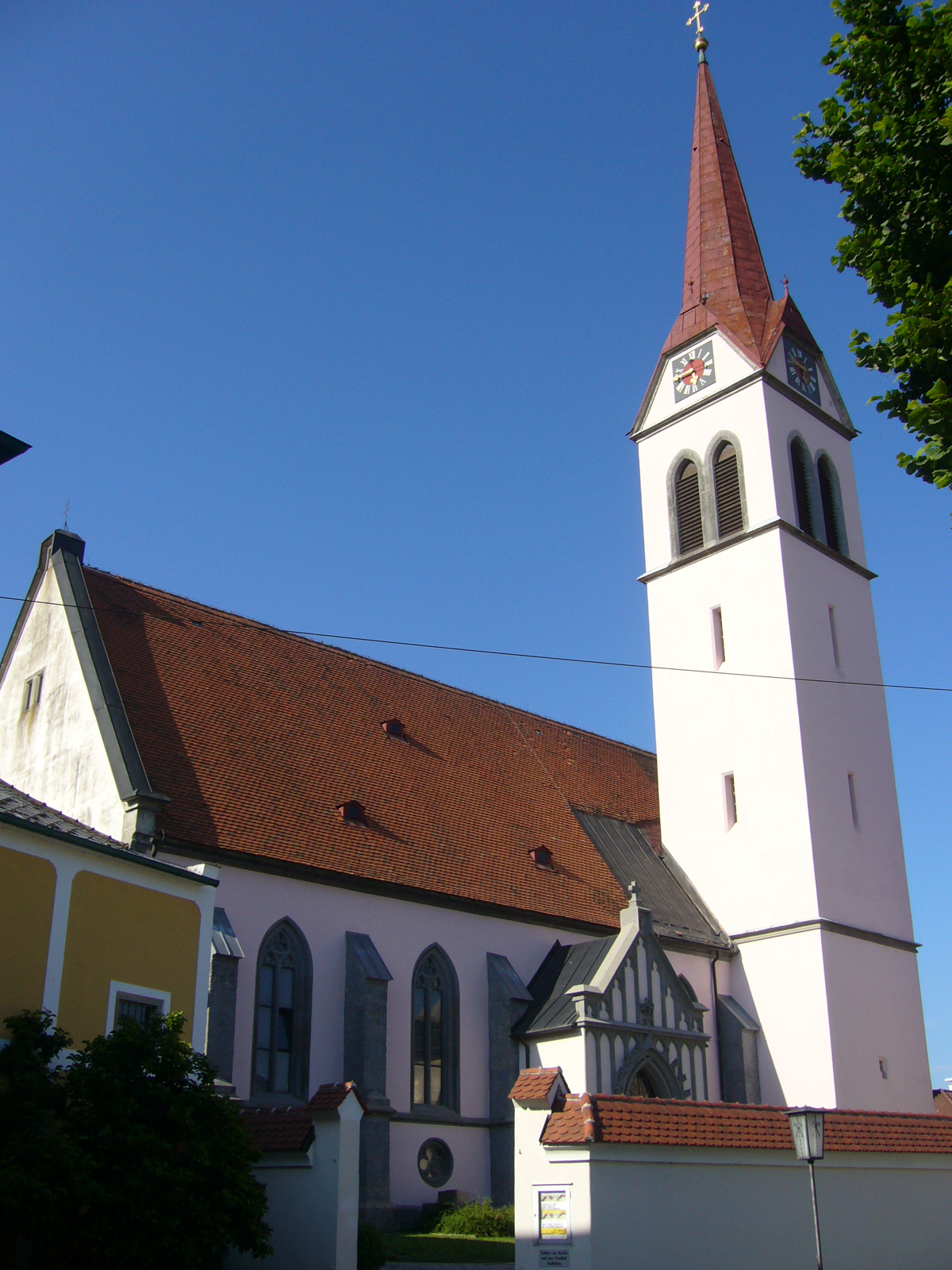
- The catholic church in Weistrach

- Coat of arms

- Location within Austria
- Coordinates: 48°2′N 14°34′E
- Country: Austria
- State: Lower Austria
- District: Amstetten

Government
  - Mayor: Erwin Pittersberger

Area
  - Total: 35.77 km^{2} (13.81 sq mi)
- Elevation: 350 m (1,150 ft)

Population (2018-01-01)
  - Total: 2,216
  - Density: 61.95/km^{2} (160.5/sq mi)
- Time zone: UTC+1 (CET)
  - Summer (DST): UTC+2 (CEST)
- Postal code: 3351
- Area code: +43 7477
- Website: www.weistrach.gv.at

Weistrach is a town in the district of Amstetten in Lower Austria in Austria.

== Geography ==
Weistrach lies in the Mostviertel in Lower Austria. About 16.48 percent of the municipality is forested.
