= Paraisópolis =

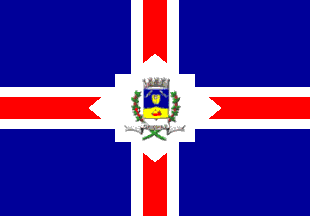
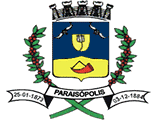
- Flag Coat of arms
- Nickname: Paraiso

- Location within Brazil
- Coordinates: 22°33′14″S 45°46′48″W
- Country: Brazil
- State: Minas Gerais
- Mesoregion: Sul/Sudoeste de Minas (IBGE/2008)
- Microregion: Itajubá (IBGE/2008)
- Established: 25 January 1873

Government
  - Mayor: Sérgio Wagner Bizarria (until 2012)

Area
  - Total: 331,510 km^{2} (128,000 sq mi)
- Elevation: 968 m (3,176 ft)

Population (2020)
  - Total: 21,221
- Demonym: paraisopolitano or paraisopolense

Paraisópolis is a city in Minas Gerais, Brazil, with a population (2020) of 21,221.

The municipality contains part of the 180,373 hectares (445,710 acres) Fernão Dias Environmental Protection Area, created in 1997.

== See also ==
- List of municipalities in Minas Gerais
