= M Health Fairview =

American healthcare network

Coordinates: 44°58′20″N 93°13′56″W

- Company type: Nonprofit
- Industry: Healthcare
- Founded: January 1, 2019
- Headquarters: Minneapolis, US
- Products: Hospitals
- Number of employees: 36,865 (2024)
- Website: www.mhealthfairview.org

M Health Fairview is a healthcare brand located in Minnesota, United States, representing the collaboration between the University of Minnesota Medical School, University of Minnesota Physicians, and Fairview Health Services. The organization offers a comprehensive range of health services, including primary and specialty care, hospital care, and pharmacy services. It operates a network of hospitals, clinics, and pharmacies throughout Minnesota.

== History ==
=== Fairview Health Services ===
Fairview Health Services is a nonprofit, integrated health system based in Minneapolis, Minnesota. It provides health care across the full spectrum of health care services. As of 2010, Fairview operated ten hospitals, including M Health Fairview University of Minnesota Medical Center.

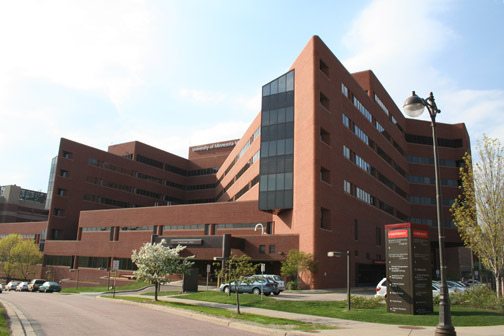
The University campus of the University of Minnesota Medical Center

In June 2010, Thomson Reuters identified Fairview Health Services as one of the top ten health care systems in the United States. In January 2011, HealthGrades listed Fairview Ridges in Burnsville and Fairview Southdale in Edina as "Distinguished Hospitals for Clinical Excellence," with each ranking in the top 5% of hospitals in the area. In October 2016, James Hereford, former COO of Stanford Health Care, became CEO of Fairview.

In May 2017, Fairview announced they were merging with HealthEast Care System which serves primarily St. Paul and the eastern suburbs of the Twin Cities. The combined Fairview/HealthEast has approximately 33,200 employees.

=== M Health Fairview ===

Starting on January 1, 2019, M Health Fairview became the name of the partnership between the University of Minnesota Medical School, University of Minnesota Physicians, and Fairview Health Services.

As of November 8, 2019, M Health Fairview had about 34,000 employees. It has ten hospitals and about 60 clinics.
