= Courage Kenny Rehabilitation Institute =

Medicine institute in Minnesota, US

- Established: 1942
- Address: 800 E 28th Street
- Location: 28th Street and Chicago Avenue, Minneapolis, Minnesota, US
- Coordinates: 44.999208°N 93.329511°W
- Website: www.allinahealth.org/couragekenny

The Courage Kenny Rehabilitation Institute is a rehabilitation medicine institute in Minneapolis, United States.

== History ==
This Allina Health facility was created in 2013 by the merger of Courage Center and Sister Kenny Rehabilitation Institute. The Sister Kenny Institute (which opened in 1942) and Courage Center (which started serving children in 1928) were both focused on physical rehabilitation for people with specific physical conditions, as well as advocacy and other support. The two organizations had been working toward similar goals for decades prior to the formal merger, and they were funded by some of the same sources such as March of Dimes and the United Way, as well as grassroots fund-raising campaigns that progressed into medical philanthropy.

Sister Kenny Institute and Courage Center also had some personnel in common, including at the highest levels. Dr. Miland Knapp (1906-1991), who along with Sister Kenny, pioneered physical rehabilitation techniques, was director of training at the Sister Kenny Institute as of when it opened in 1942, and was director of physical medicine and rehabilitation from 1948 to 1964. He was medical director at Courage Center from 1957 to 1975. He also was a senior consultant at the VA Hospital from 1948 to 1964.

By the 1980s the natural overlap between the two organizations became more evident. There were more and more patients and families who had interactions with both organizations, they also worked together on events and in other ways. Some, like Lloyd Zeise (Olympic Athlete), was treated at Sister Kenny Institute as a child and used the services of the Courage Center as an adult due to contracting polio at age 3. An increasing number had exposure to both organizations due to brain injury or spinal cord injury; they would be initially treated at the Kenny Institute within Abbott-NW Hospital, and then continue their healing at Courage Center. Managed-care health plans and other systemic changes in the US had impacts on both organizations, as their network situations and their service provisions continued to be updated.

=== Sister Kenny Institute ===
Polio is a disease that had existed throughout human history, but increased sanitation reduced immunity to it, which led to increasing incidence and increasing severity in the 20th century. The initial response by the medical community was to put splints and braces on affected limbs, in order to prevent the affected parts of the body from harming the rest of the body. Sister Elizabeth Kenny, an Australian healthcare provider who worked as a nurse during World War I, had a different approach. She spent decades in her career investigating and experimenting with treatments involving heat (to relax the muscles) and movement (to help heal the entire body). In Australia in 1932 Kenny opened the Sister Kenny Clinic in the Outpatients Building of the Rockhampton Base Hospital in Queensland, and she also set up a clinic at Royal North Shore Hospital in Sydney.

In 1942 Kenny came to the US to provide her experience for treatment of the disease. Minnesota alone was immediately receptive to her methods. Her therapeutic treatment for polio survivors resulted in less severe deformities and reduced hospital stays, and led to today’s innovative rehabilitation therapy methods. The original Minneapolis facility, initially called the Kenny clinic, was the first one established in the United States. Kenny worked closely with physicians and nurses at University Hospital and the Minneapolis General Hospital (now Hennepin County Medical Center) including providing training at the University of Minnesota". Other locations were established around the country that same decade.

In Minneapolis, the initial Sister Kenny facility was located within the Lymanhurst Health Center on Chicago Avenue and 18th Street in Minneapolis. which had served children with heart problems caused by Rheumatic fever. At first the building served both groups, but within 18 months the heart patients were moved out to make room for the growing number of polio patients. That building later became the Hennepin County Detox Center. In 1975 the Sister Kenny Institute moved to the Chicago and 27th Street location of the recently merged Abbott-Northwestern Hospital.

Sister Kenny approved of the Chicago Avenue location for her primary teaching and treatment location in the U.S. originally because of its proximity to the staff of the Minneapolis General Hospital and to the research laboratories of the University Hospital. Her clinic brought people from around the world who sought her expertise in curing the paralysis caused by polio prior to the existence of the vaccine. Her method, opposite of standard practice of splints to immobilize the limbs, was to apply heat to soothe the muscles and then encourage movement through an early form of physical therapy. That 'get up and go' approach has since become common response to many crippling illnesses and injuries.

Fundraising for the Sister Kenny Institute was varied. The Sister Kenny Foundation was established in 1943 to support Kenny and clinics throughout the United States. In addition to established sources such as March of Dimes and United Way, the institute received funds from private groups such as Crippled Child Relief, Inc., a Minnesota nonprofit which sprang from a single short advertisement in the newspaper. (Note: The ad in 1929 read: 'Anyone knowing of a crippled child financially unable to be cared for, please call Regent 1138.' Mrs. Olson of South Minneapolis received 23 calls the day the ad ran. Fourteen children at the University hospitals were identified as needing assistance. Almost 300 people contributed small amounts. Soon after that by-laws were drawn up and the organization was incorporated.) In 1945 a $5 million national drive was launched, chaired by Bing Crosby, to open additional locations and provide training for nurses in these treatment methods.

The Institute faced a fund-raising scandal in the early 1960s. In March 1960, the state of Minnesota began an investigation on the charity. The state found that between 1952 and 1959 the mail-based fundraising campaign had brought in $20 million, of which the fundraising company kept $11 million in "fees", which included both legitimate expenses and such things as kickbacks to the Institute's executive director. That director, former Minneapolis mayor Marvin L. Kline, and others involved in the scheme were convicted on fraud charges. Kline had been separately convicted of grand larceny in 1961 for illegally boosting his salary as director by creating false documentation upping his salary from $25,000 per year to $48,000.

After widespread adoption of the Polio vaccine in the mid-1950s reduced the number of cases nationwide, the clinic switched its focus to rehabilitation medicine more broadly defined. Cerebral Palsy and other birth defects as well as conditions caused by accidents all became included in the work of the Kenny Institute. In 1975 the Sister Kenny Institute merged with Abbott-Northwestern.

=== Courage Center ===
Courage Center’s predecessor organization, the Minnesota Society for Crippled Children and Adults, was founded in 1928. It had a legacy in advocating the needs of children and adults in education, by granting access to health care issues. The national organization became better known as Easter Seals, and the Minnesota Society was referred to with both names for decades. Besides the original Easter Seals campaigns themselves, funding has been provided by a variety of sources, including United Way.

Annual summer camps at Camp Kiwanis near Stillwater, Minnesota, were held in the 1940s for children with speech defects. The children were provided with brief periods of intensive training provided by speech therapists from the University of Minnesota and elsewhere. The camp site was provided by the St. Paul Kiwanis Club. Other camps were held for children with heart problems or orthopedic challenges. Expenses for those who cannot pay the costs themselves were provided by Easter Seal returns.

By 1953, 600 children had to be turned away from Camp Kiwannis summer camp sessions because the demand was so much greater than that location's capacity. Planning started for a second location at Camp Courage, with the capacity for 400 children each year.

Camp Courage in Wright County on Cedar Lake between Annandale and Maple Lake opened for its first summer session in 1955. Some of those first campers had been affected by a variety of diseases including polio, cerebral palsy, muscular dystrophy, rheumatoid arthritis. Other campers had experienced congenital deformities, physical changes from accidents, head injuries and/or blindness. The name 'Camp Courage' was so popular that the predecessor organization changed its name to Courage Center.

Courage North, which opened at Lake George near Itasca State Park in 1971, was a donation to the Society.

The Courage Center outdoor adaptive sports program in Duluth was established in 1979. It began originally as a partnership with the UMD Recreational Sports program and the United Way. The first Parasports programs were a competitive wheelchair basketball team, adapted downhill skiing (at Spirit Mountain), sailing (with the involvement of the Duluth Superior Sailing Association), swimming, and track and field. In the Twin Cities Three Rivers Park system has been one of Courage Kenny's main program partners since 2010, providing opportunities for cross-country skiing, mountain biking, kayaking, archery, geocaching, ice fishing and maple sugaring. Courage Kenny is Minnesota's main chapter of Move United, which was formed in the merger of Disabled Sports USA and Adaptive Sports USA.

The main year-round rehabilitation facility and office building was established in Golden Valley in 1973. The fitness and wellness center was rebuilt at twice its original size in 2017 through a capital campaign which raised $4.75 million. It is part of the Christopher and Dana Reeve Foundation NeuroRecovery Network (NRN), focused on people with spinal cord injuries. Additional facilities were opened in Stillwater, Burnsville and Forest Lake.

Courage Center has held events such as competitive wheelchair basketball tournaments since the 1980s, with the participation and support of various organizations including the Sister Kenny Institute.

In 2003 a survey by Twin Cities Business Monthly magazine on nonprofit reputations resulted in Mayo Clinic having the best reputation in the State of Minnesota, and Courage Center being #2.

== Services ==
The Courage Kenny Rehabilitation Institute serves people with disabilities and those recovering from serious injuries such as a brain injury, stroke or spinal cord injury. It provides physical rehabilitation therapy and a variety of independent living services, including testing services for senior drivers. Courage Center also advocates for people with disabilities at the Minnesota state legislature and in other public forums.

The Institute serves clients of all ages with a wide range of diagnoses. The Institute’s care team provides physician, therapy, community and mental health services in more than 40 locations in Minnesota and western Wisconsin.

== Locations ==
The Courage Kenny Rehabilitation Institute has facilities in the Twin Cities metropolitan area of Minnesota. Services are provided at several Allina Health hospitals. Some of the locations include:

- Abbott Northwestern Hospital in Minneapolis
- Buffalo Hospital in Buffalo
- Mercy Hospital in Coon Rapids
- Owatonna Hospital in Owatonna
- United Hospital in St. Paul
- Unity Hospital in Fridley
- Cambridge Medical Center in Cambridge
- Regina Hospital in Hastings
- River Falls Hospital in River Falls
- New Ulm Medical Center in New Ulm
- Courage Kenny Main in Golden Valley
- Courage Kenny St. Croix in Stillwater
- Courage Kenny Rehabilitation Institute - Northland in Duluth
- many community-based Courage Kenny Sports & Physical Therapy Centers located throughout the Twin Cities metro area

Courage Center had formerly operated a sports and recreation office in Duluth, and camps at Maple Lake and Lake George.

== See also ==
- Allina Hospitals & Clinics
- Camp Courage (Minnesota)
