= True Friends =

True Friends may refer to:

- Friendship, a relationship of mutual affection between people
- True Friends (film), a 1954 Soviet comedy-drama
- "True Friends" (song), by Bring Me the Horizon, 2015
- True Friends, a Minnesota nonprofit organization that operates Camp Courage
