= Commodore Hotel (Saint Paul, Minnesota) =

Historic Minnesota hotel

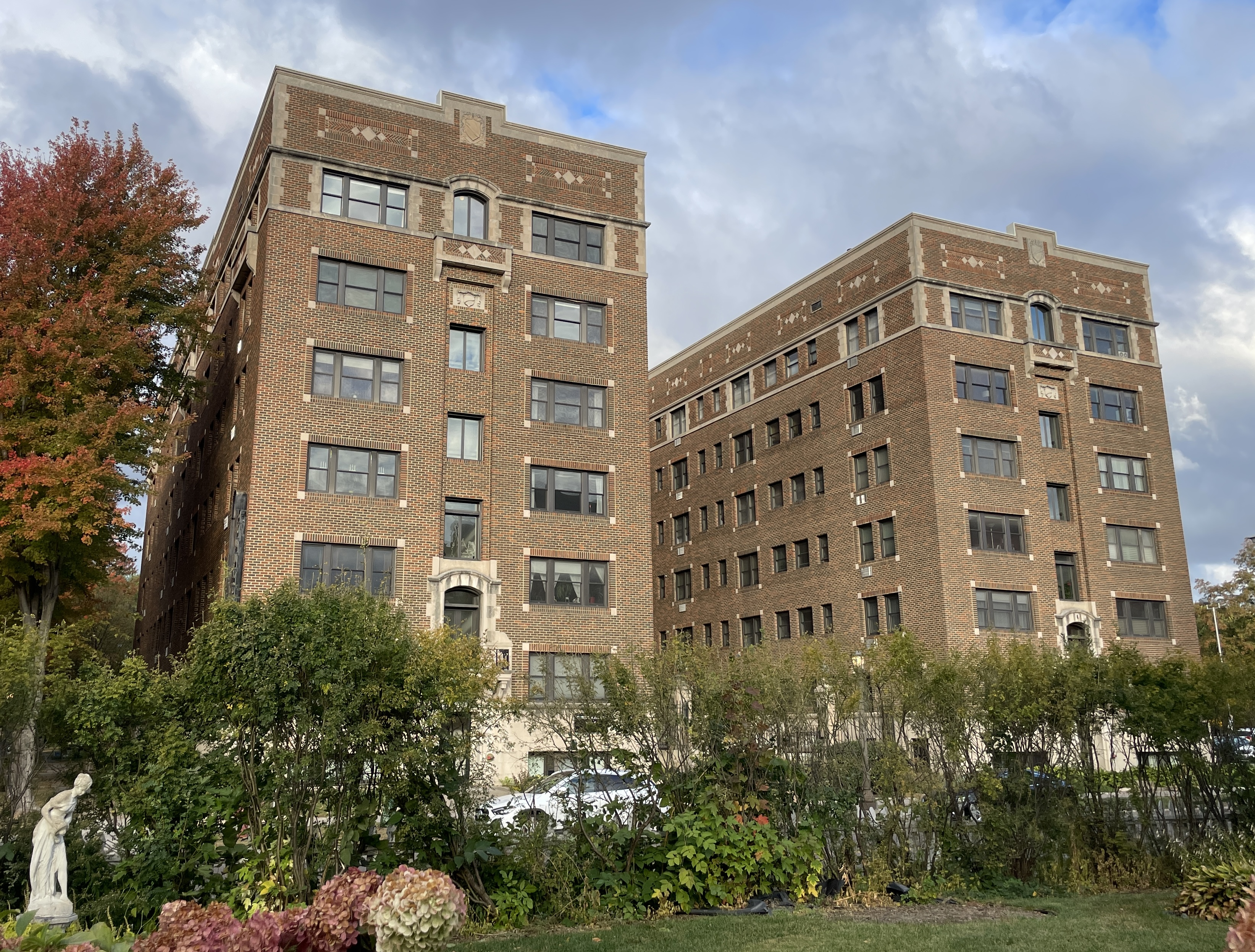
The Commodore in 2024

The Commodore Hotel was a 140-unit apartment hotel located in Saint Paul, Minnesota on the northwest corner of Western and Holly Avenues. Constructed in 1920, the building featured a dining room, ballroom, a rooftop garden, and a courtyard entrance. A cocktail lounge and coffee shop were added later. In 1976 it was listed as a contributing property to the Historic Hill District on the National Register of Historic Places. After two natural gas explosions damaged the building in 1978, the building was remodeled into a 50-unit condominium project called The Commodore Condominiums, and The Commodore Bar & Restaurant, both of which continue to operate.

== History ==
The Fleisher Construction Company built the Commodore Hotel (as well as an identical apartment hotel in Minneapolis called the Buckingham) for the Eastern Finance Company in 1920. The Commodore featured one- and two-room apartments, with and without kitchenettes, furnished or unfurnished. Rooms had telephones and concealed beds. Tenants who signed leases of four years or more could have their apartment customized.

In 1921, the Industrial Investment Company purchased the Commodore and Buckingham hotels for $1.8 million; the company was led by Harry Pence and Archie Walker, youngest son of T. B. Walker and Harriet Walker. Following the end of Prohibition, former Ziegfeld Follies set designer Werner Wittkamp designed an Art Deco bar for the hotel. In 1943, the hotel was sold. It changed hands again in 1947, 1965, and 1974. Near midnight on November 6, 1952, a four-alarm fire destroyed the rooftop garden, and approximately 200 guests were evacuated.

On February 15, 1978, two mid-day explosions occurred at the Commodore, blowing a hole in the north wall of the building. The blasts injured 71 people, including firefighters. In 1983, a judge ruled that the City of Saint Paul and Northern States Power Company were at fault for failure to inspect the gas leak that caused the explosions. After ceasing hotel operations, owner Thomand O'Brien converted the hotel to a 50-unit condominium complex and separate bar and restaurant in 1980.

== Notable guests ==
F. Scott Fitzgerald and his wife Zelda Fitzgerald were residents of the hotel in 1921 during the birth of their only child, Frances "Scottie" Fitzgerald. In a 1934 article appearing in Esquire, the Fitzgeralds wrote, "In the fall [1921] we got to the Commodore in St. Paul, and while leaves blew up the streets we waited for our child to be born." Other notable guests include Ma Barker and her family, as well as August Wilson.
