= Hennepin Avenue United Methodist Church =

Church in Minneapolis, Minnesota

Coordinates: 44°57′59″N 93°17′15″W

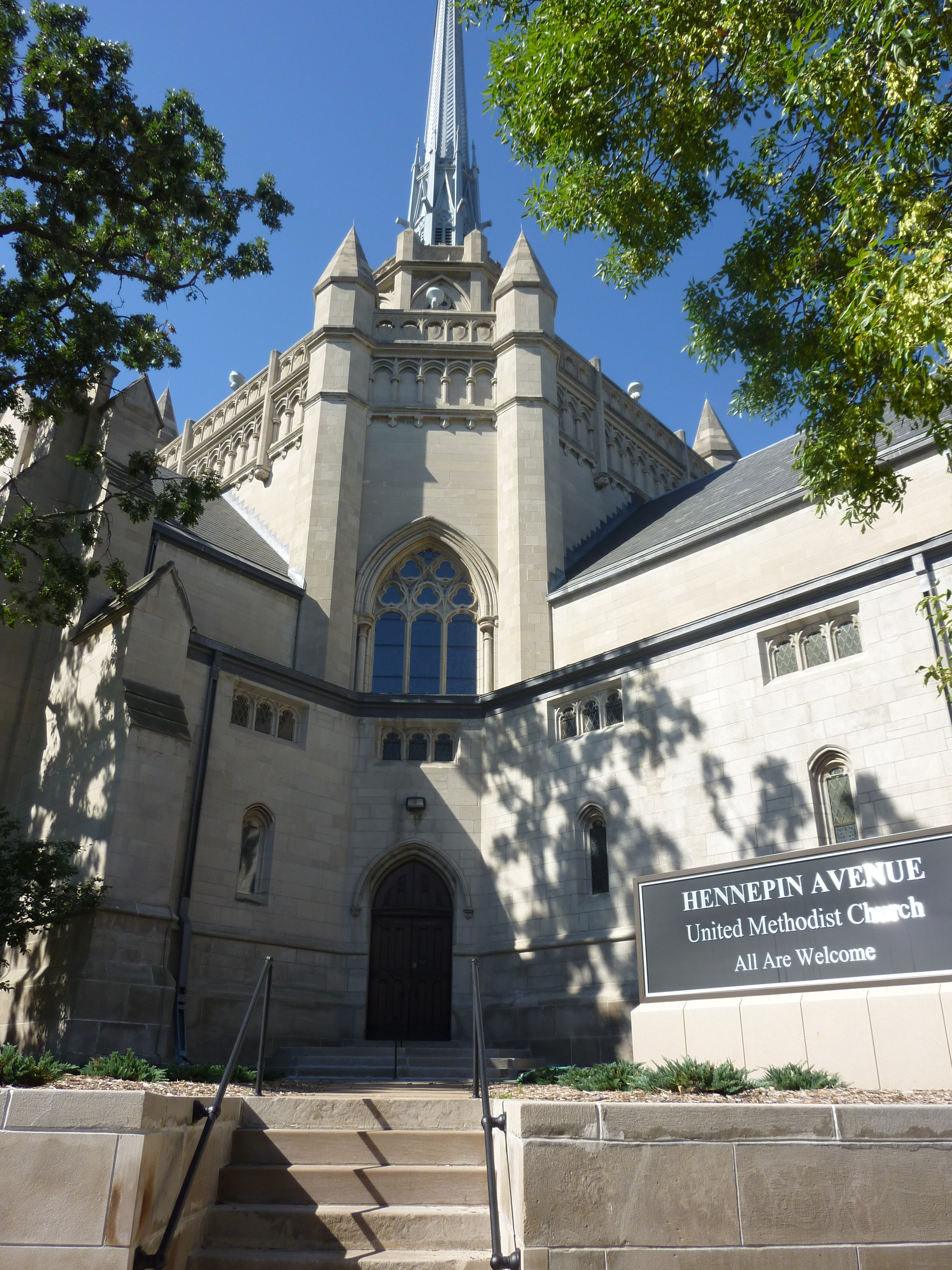

Hennepin Avenue United Methodist Church is a church across the Virginia Triangle (Hennepin Avenue/Lyndale Avenue) from the Walker Art Center in Minneapolis, Minnesota. Its address is 511 Groveland Avenue.

== History ==
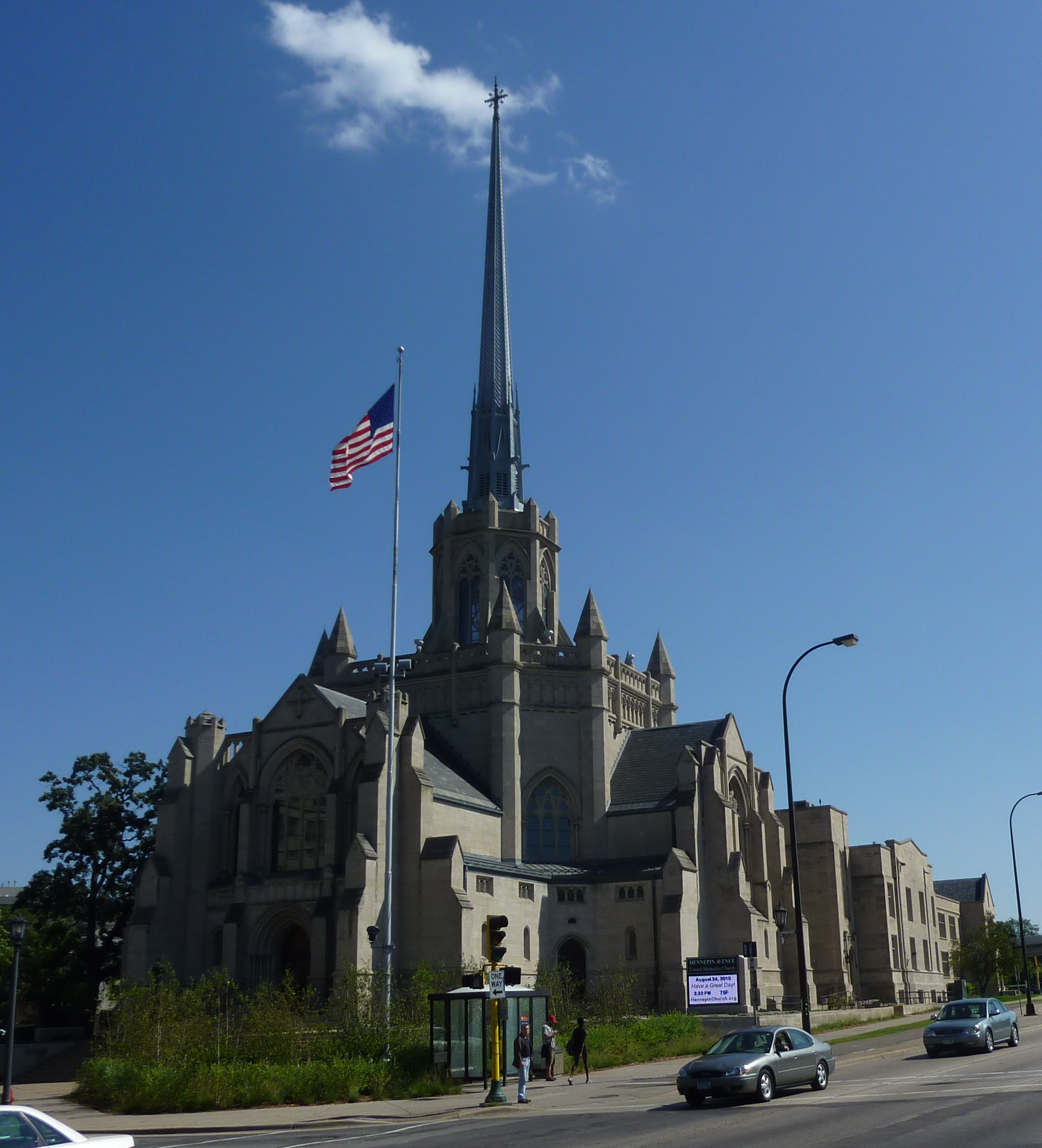
Today the church and its chapels occupy a full block on Hennepin

The church was organized as Hennepin Avenue Methodist Episcopal Church in 1875 by about ninety members of Centenary church, which at the time was the only Methodist church in the city. The Quaker church organized the Sunday school.

During the 1960s, the ground around the Lowry Hill I-94 tunnel was frozen with special refrigeration equipment to protect the church from structural damage in case the tunnel walls should collapse during construction.

The church stands on land donated by T. B. Walker, a trustee of the church. Walker also donated several paintings to decorate the Sunday school. His wife, Harriet G. Walker, was a member.

In 1993, the congregation became a reconciling ministry that specifically welcomes LGBT members (lesbian, gay, bisexual, and transgender people).

== Design ==
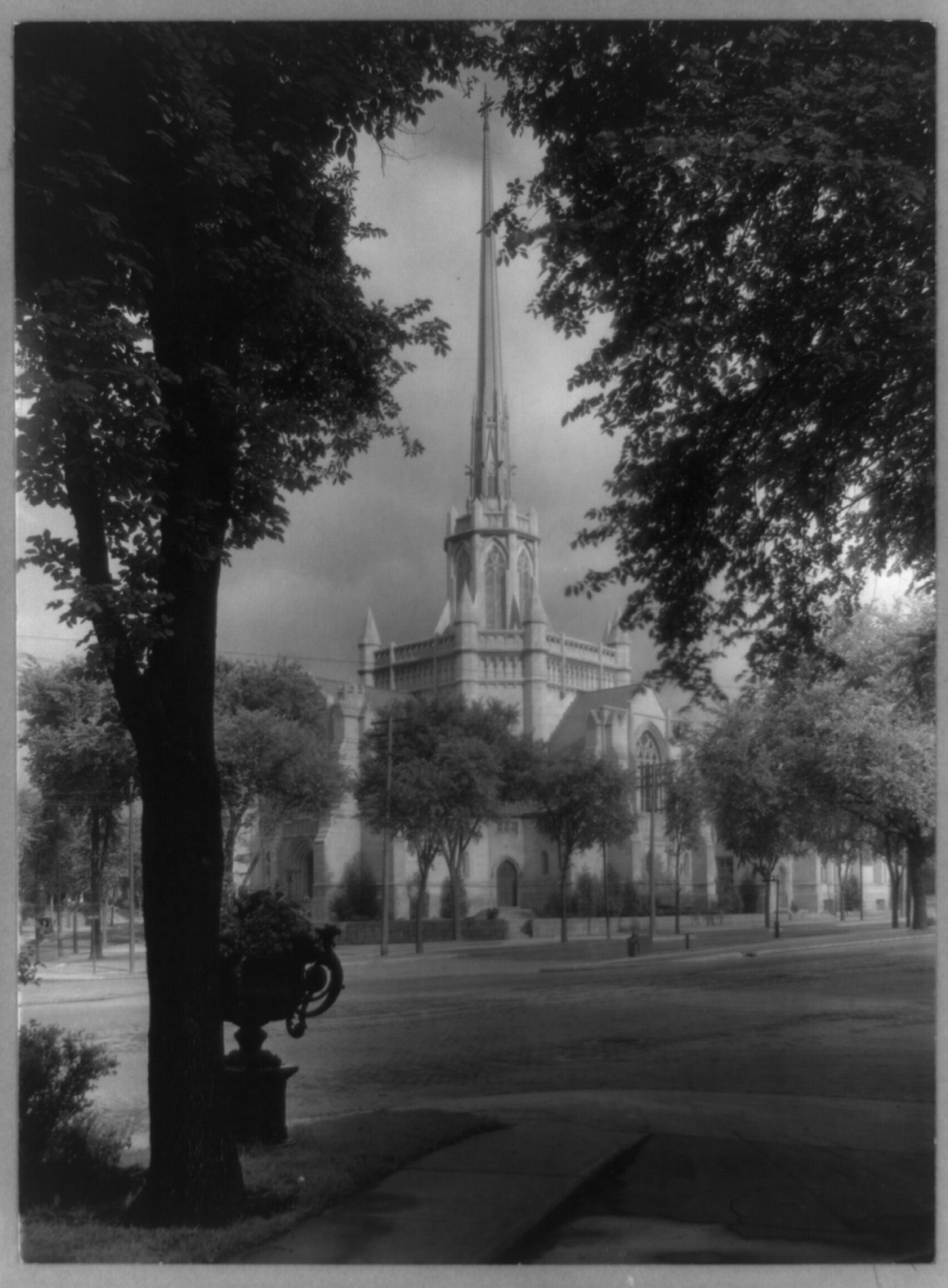
Hennepin Avenue United Methodist Church, 1917

The architects Hewitt and Brown designed the church in English Gothic style, and modeled it after Ely Cathedral. Edwin Hawley Hewitt, who had earlier built St. Mark's Episcopal Cathedral nearby on Hennepin Avenue, was a design partner who traveled to England to see Ely Cathedral before this church was built.

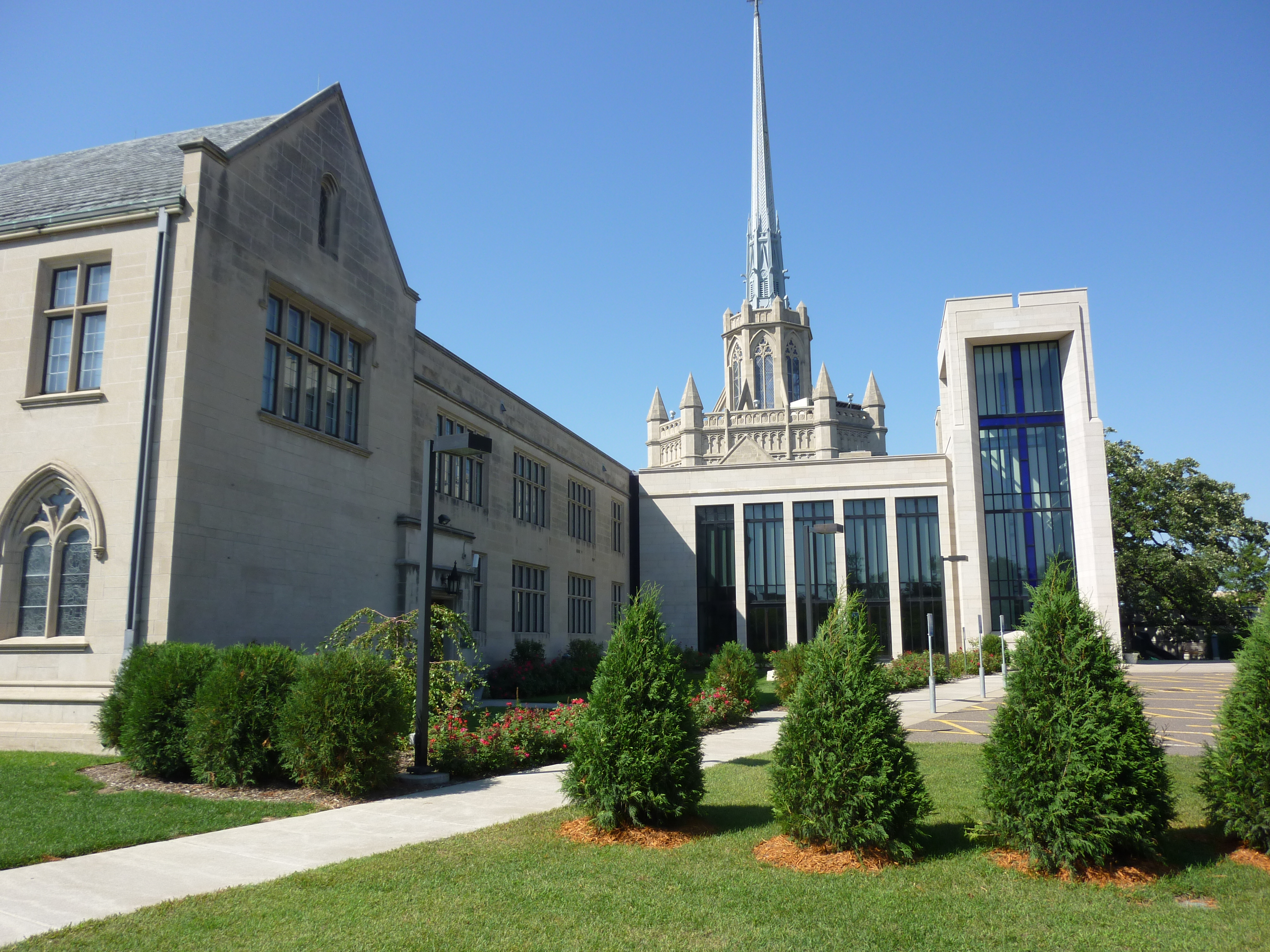
New entrance designed by Hammel, Green and Abrahamson

Completed in 1916 and measuring 238 feet from the sidewalk to the top of the spire, at the time it was the second tallest building in Minneapolis. Only the clock tower of Minneapolis City Hall was taller. The exterior face is soft gray Bedford limestone. Gustavino tile lines the interior to absorb sound. The pews, altar and balconies are built of white oak.

In 2006, HGA designed a new entry for the church that won an IES/IIDA Twin Cities Waterbury Award for outdoor lighting design.
