= Harriet G. Walker =

American hospital administrator and leader in the temperance movement

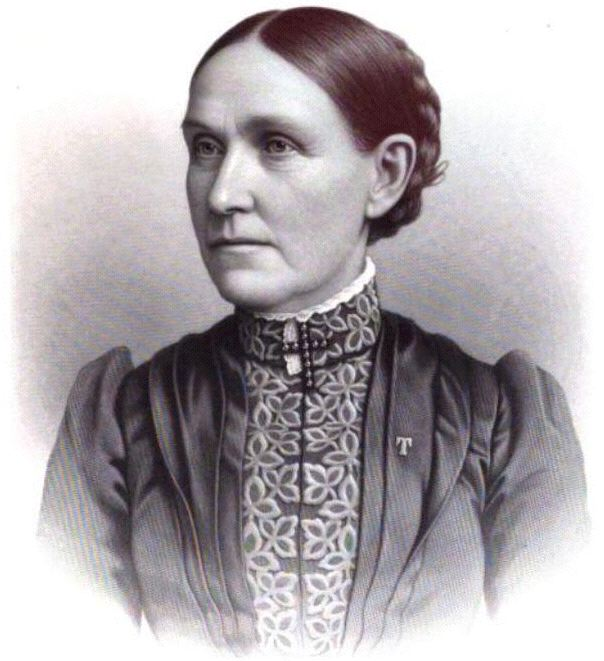
- Born: Harriet Granger Hulet; 10 September 1841; Brunswick, Ohio, U.S.
- Died: January 13, 1917 (aged 75); New York City, New York, U.S.
- Resting place: Lakewood Cemetery
- Known for: president of Northwestern Hospital, now Abbott Northwestern Hospital of Allina Hospitals & Clinics
- Spouse: T. B. Walker
- Children: Gilbert, Julia, Leon, Harriet, Fletcher, Willis, Clinton, and Archie

Harriet Granger Hulet Walker (10 September 1841 – 13 January 1917) was an American hospital administrator and leader in the temperance movement.

== Early life ==
She was born in Brunswick, Ohio in the United States. She attended Baldwin University and in 1863 married T. B. Walker. They later lived in Minneapolis, Minnesota and had eight children.

Her mother, whose last name was Granger, came from Berkshire County in Massachusetts, like Walker's father. Her mother's husband, the Honorable Fletcher Hulet, was a "prosperous businessman" who owned a quarry that sold grindstones. Later in life, Walker's husband would go to Minneapolis-Saint Paul to sell grindstones and meet James J. Hill when he was a young clerk who later was involved with the Great Northern Railway, Northern Pacific Railway, and the Chicago, Burlington and Quincy Railroad.

Her father's father served in the American Revolutionary War and participated in the Battle of Bunker Hill.

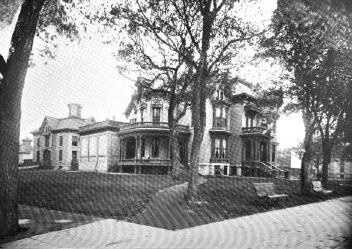
Walker home at 803 Hennepin Avenue, Minneapolis

Walker studied vocal and instrumental music at what is today Baldwin-Wallace College, and then taught music for two years. One of her classmates was Thomas B. Walker who worked for Walker's father. They were engaged and wanted to live in Minneapolis. The Reverend J. Wheeler, president of Baldwin University, married them. Wheeler was Walker's brother in law.

Her husband had to travel for his work for months at a time, so their first years were difficult. They wanted to build a home, and when their fortunes improved, they became interested in "books and art." Their home on Hennepin Avenue was remembered in the History of the City of Minneapolis, Minnesota by Isaac Atwater as a place of "refined and generous hospitality" and the nursery for their children.

== Associations ==
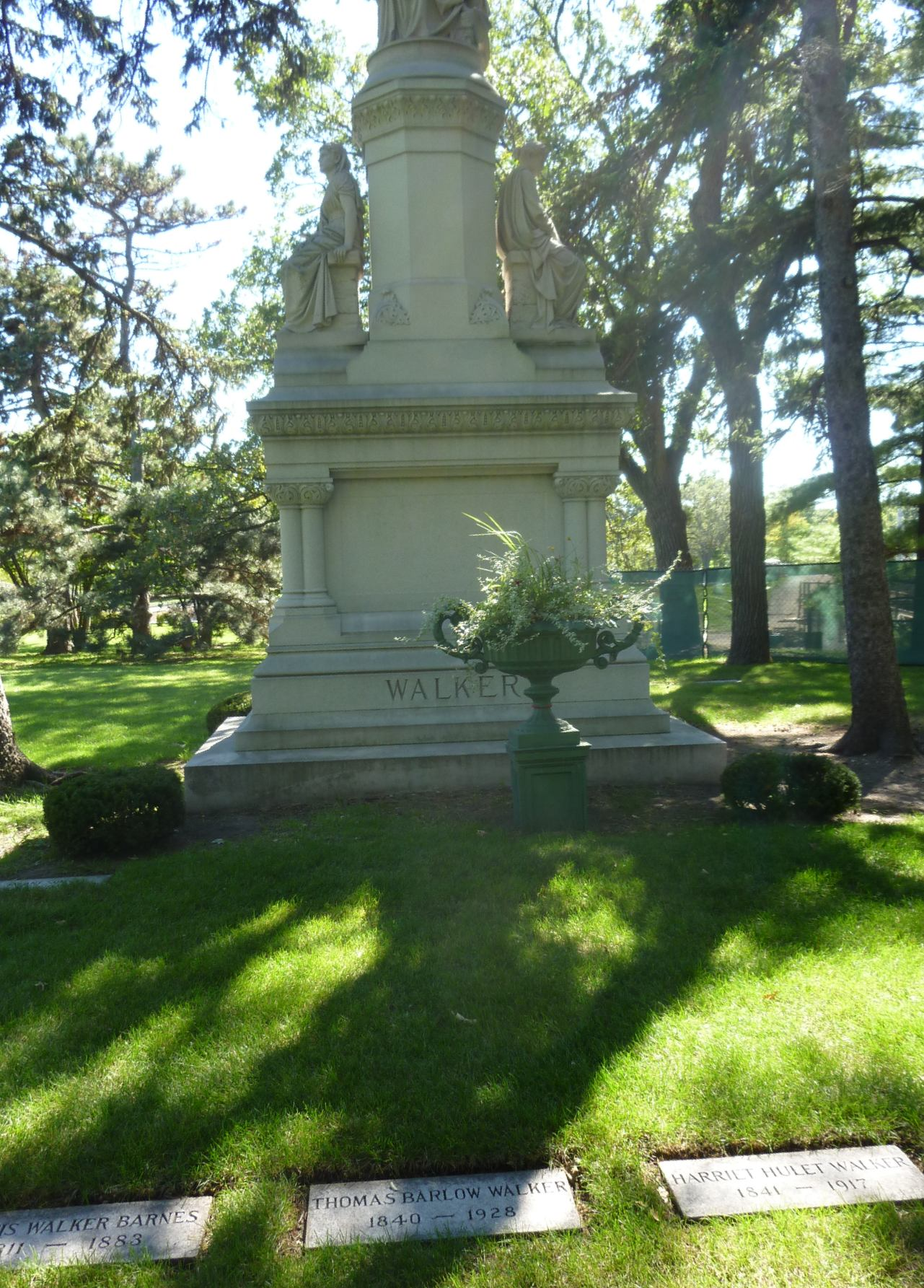
Walker memorial and graves at Lakewood Cemetery in Minneapolis

Walker was president of Northwestern Hospital, now Abbott Northwestern Hospital of Allina Health, from 1862 to 1917, president of the Bethany Home now Walker Methodist Home, and worked with or was a member of the Women's Council of the City of Minneapolis, Hennepin Avenue Methodist Church, the Non-Partisan National Women's Christian Temperance Union, and the Minneapolis Association Opposed to the Further Extension of Suffrage to Women. Walker died in New York City in 1917 and was buried in Lakewood Cemetery in Minneapolis. Her gravestone says "Harriet Hulet Walker" but she is called "Harriet G. Walker" by the Minnesota Historical Society as well as by Isaac Atwater.

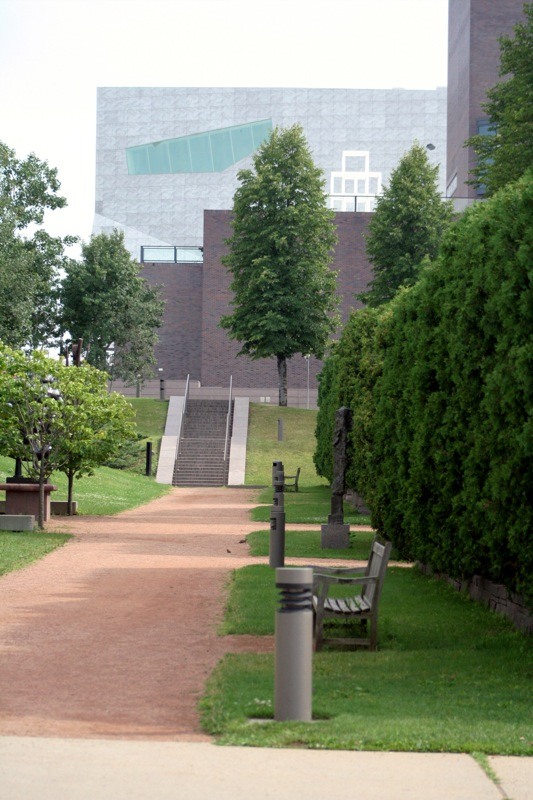
Walker Art Center at 1750 Hennepin Avenue, adjacent to the Minneapolis Sculpture Garden in 2006

The Walker home on Hennepin Avenue was a public art gallery now known as the Walker Art Center, today about a mile from the house, for many years was connected to and shared a lobby with the Guthrie Theater. The family's art gallery was in one or more other locations prior to the present one. T. B. Walker commissioned galleries to be built around the house to start with to house his extensive collection. In about 1914 the house was torn down. The State Theatre in downtown Minneapolis is on the site today, renovated with a few other theaters in the area, and is part of one of the city's entertainment districts.

== See also ==
- Women's Christian Temperance Union
