= Commodore Hotel =

Commodore Hotel may refer to:

- Hyatt Grand Central New York, formerly named Commodore Hotel
- Commodore Hotel (Portland, Oregon)
- Commodore Hotel (Saint Paul, Minnesota)
