= Penny George Institute for Health and Healing =

Coordinates: 44°57′05.3″N 93°15′42.7″W

The Penny George Institute for Health and Healing
- Founders: Penny and Bill George
- Established: 2003
- Address: 2833 Chicago Avenue
- Location: 28th Street and Chicago Avenue, Minneapolis, Minnesota, United States
- Website: allinahealth.org

The Penny George Institute for Health and Healing is an integrative medicine institute in Minneapolis, United States.

== History ==
The Institute was founded in 2003 through the support of the George Family Foundation and the Ted and Dr. Roberta Mann Foundation. It is named for Penny George, a cancer patient and a member of the George Family.

== See also ==
- Allina Health
