= Mercy Hospital (Minnesota) =

- Allina Health

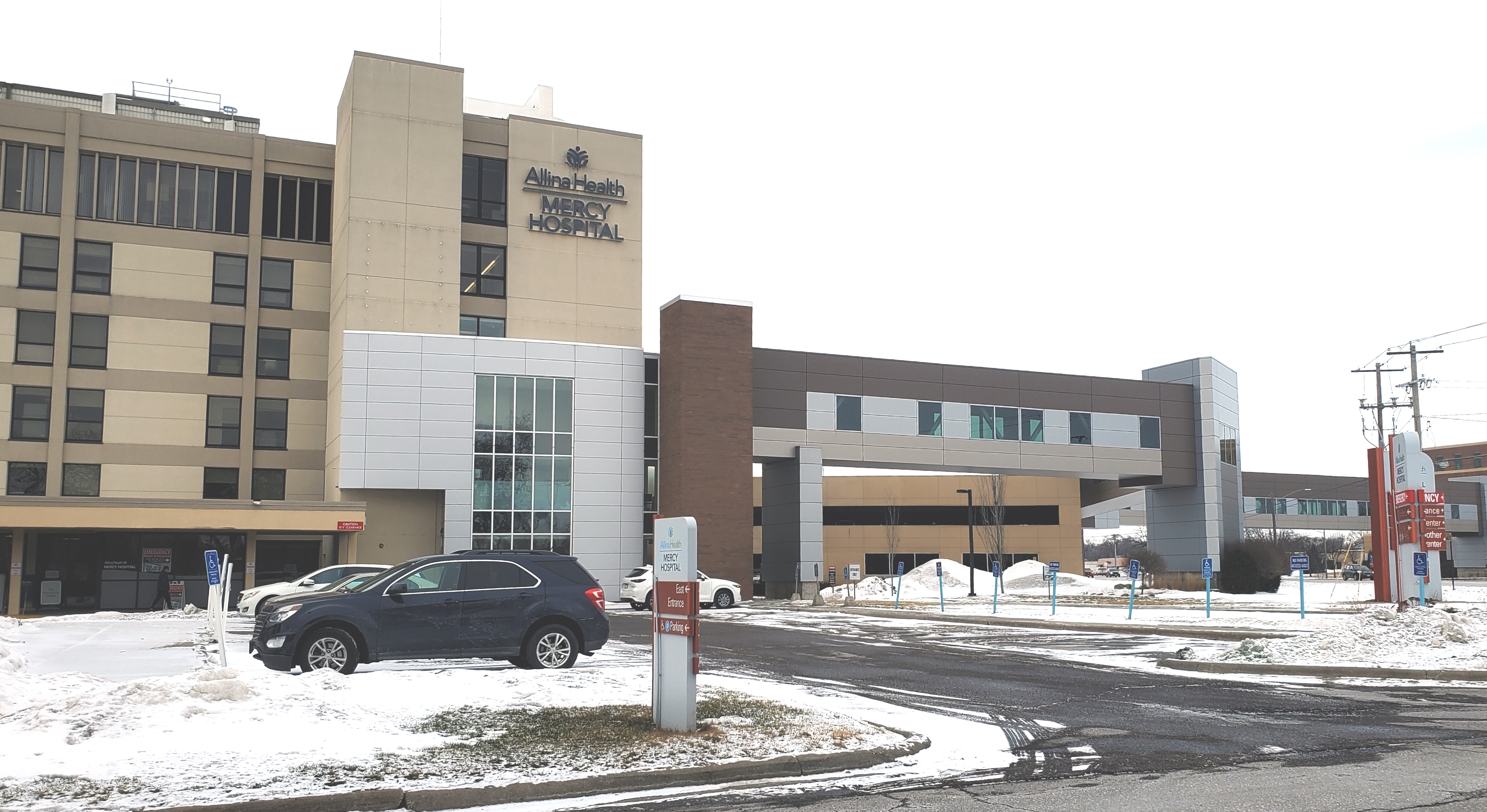

Geography
- Location: 4050 Coon Rapids Boulevard, Coon Rapids, Minneapolis–Saint Paul, Minnesota, United States
- Coordinates: 45.18289°N 93.36969°W

Services
- Beds: 471

History
- Opened: March 17, 1965

Links
- Website: allinahealth.org/mercy-hospital
- Lists: Hospitals in Minnesota

Mercy Hospital, located in Coon Rapids, Minnesota, is a 471-bed non-profit hospital that serves the northern Twin Cities metropolitan area. Mercy Hospital is a part of Allina Health.

== History ==
Mercy Hospital was first opened on March 17, 1965. There is also a Unity campus of Mercy Hospital.

== Take Heart Anoka County ==
Mercy Hospital is a part of Take Heart Anoka County, a coalition of doctors, nurses, paramedics, health educators and community leaders that aims to dramatically increase the likelihood of survival after sudden cardiac arrest by training more people in cardiopulmonary resuscitation (CPR) and placing automated external defibrillators (AEDs) in public places throughout the community. Similar approach to promoting cardiac arrest and CPR awareness is also being followed in St. Cloud, Minnesota; Columbus, Ohio and Austin, Texas.
