= Camp Courage =

Coordinates: 45.2660764°N 94.0569252°W

Camp Courage is an accessible recreational and residential camp located near Maple Lake, Minnesota, United States. The camp is owned and operated by True Friends, a Minnesota nonprofit organization serving children and adults with disabilities. Camp Courage offers year-round programs including summer camp, respite weekends, outdoor education, adaptive recreation, retreats, and team-building experiences.

Camp Courage occupies a 305-acre (1.23 km^{2}) campus consisting of the Lakeside Campus and the Woodland Campus. The camp includes accessible lodging, dining facilities, recreational spaces, horseback riding facilities, waterfront activities, and adaptive outdoor recreation amenities.

Camp Courage was established in 1953 by the Minnesota Society for Crippled Children and Adults, the predecessor to Courage Center. In 2012, Camp Courage became part of True Friends following the merger of Courage Center's camping programs with Friendship Ventures.

== Programs ==
Camp Courage provides recreational and therapeutic programming for children and adults with physical, developmental, intellectual, sensory, and neurological disabilities. Programs include summer camp sessions, family camps, respite weekends, outdoor education, adaptive horseback riding, and group retreats.
