= New Ulm Medical Center =

Coordinates: 44°18′44″N 94°28′34″W

- Allina Health

Geography
- Location: 1324 5TH STREET NORTH; New Ulm, Brown County, Minnesota, United States

Organization
- Care system: Nonprofit
- Type: General

Services
- Beds: 62 licensed

History
- Opened: November 1, 1883

Links
- Website: www.allinahealth.org/new-ulm-medical-center/
- Lists: Hospitals in Minnesota

New Ulm Medical Center is a not-for-profit hospital and clinic serving the region in and around Brown County in south central Minnesota, United States. New Ulm Medical Center is part of the Allina Health System. New Ulm Medical Center offers a variety of specialty care including orthopedics, general surgery, psychiatry and pediatrics.

== History ==
The need for a hospital in the New Ulm, Minnesota area became apparent in 1881, when a tornado killed more than ten people and injured several hundred. Since there was no hospital in the area, the Sisters of Christian Charity School opened their doors to treat the victims of the tornado. Father Berghold, organizer of the Catholic Church, recognized this arrangement was not an adequate long-term solution and launched a community campaign to raise money to build a permanent hospital. Berghold succeeded. St. Alexander Hospital, New Ulm Medical Center's oldest ancestor, accepted its first patient on November 1, 1883.

In the following years, several moves, mergers and name changes ensued. The current New Ulm Medical Center was built in 1962.

The New Ulm Medical Center was one of the top 100 critical access hospitals in the United States.
