= Owatonna Hospital =

- Allina Health

Geography
- Location: 2250 26th Street, NW; Owatonna, Minnesota, United States
- Coordinates: 44.11204°N 93.251°W

Organization
- Type: General

Services
- Emergency department: Level IV Trauma Center
- Beds: 39

History
- Opened: 1901

Links
- Website: www.allinahealth.org/owatonna-hospital/
- Lists: Hospitals in Minnesota

Owatonna Hospital is a non-profit regional medical center in Owatonna, Minnesota, United States that serves patients in and around Steele County, Minnesota. Owatonna Hospital provides a full range of inpatient, outpatient and emergency care services, as well as home and palliative care and hospice. It is owned by Allina Health System of Minneapolis.

== New location ==
A new hospital opened in October 2009 at 2250 NW 26th Street in Owatonna, Minnesota. The hospital adjoins with Mayo Clinic Health System - Owatonna, to create one multi-faceted health care campus. The former location was 903 S. Oak Ave. in Owatonna, Minnesota.

== Facts ==
Currently Owatonna Hospital has:

- 77 licensed hospital beds
- 350 employees
- Owatonna Clinic-Mayo Health System practicing physicians

In 2007 Owatonna Hospital had:

- 2,653 inpatient admissions
- 592 births
- 31,803 outpatient visits
- 15000 emergency department visits
- 6,399 surgeries

== Accreditation ==
Owatonna Hospital is accredited by the Joint Commission on Accreditation of Healthcare Organizations (JCAHO)

== Collective bargaining ==
Some service workers at the hospital are represented by the Service Employees International Union.
