= Cambridge Medical Center =

- Allina Health

Geography
- Location: 701 SOUTH DELLWOOD STREET; Cambridge, Isanti County, Minnesota, Minnesota, United States
- Coordinates: 45.5658333°N 93.2275000°W

Organization
- Type: General

Services
- Beds: 70 staffed (2019), 86 licensed (2020)

History
- Opened: 1956

Links
- Website: www.allinahealth.org/cambridge-medical-center/
- Lists: Hospitals in Minnesota

Cambridge Medical Center is a regional health care facility providing comprehensive health care services to more than 30,000 residents in Isanti County, Minnesota, United States. The medical center comprises a multi-specialty clinic and an 86-bed hospital located on one campus. A same day clinic, retail pharmacy, therapy center and eye care center are also located in the facility.

One of the unique aspects of the medical center is its size. Although located in the small community of Cambridge, Minnesota (population 5,520) the medical center has over 150,000 clinic patient visits each year, 4,000 inpatient hospital admissions and has over 100,000 outpatient visits annually.

== History ==
Cambridge Medical Center opened in 1956 as Memorial Hospital with 56 beds. In 1995 Memorial Hospital and Professional Medical Associates merged to form the Cambridge Medical Center.
