= Buffalo Hospital =

- Allina Health

Geography
- Location: 303 Catlin Street, Buffalo, Wright County, Minnesota, Minnesota, United States
- Coordinates: 45°11′40″N 93°52′15″W

Organization
- Type: General

Services
- Emergency department: Yes
- Beds: 65

History
- Opened: September 5, 1951

Links
- Website: www.allinahealth.org/buffalo-hospital/
- Lists: Hospitals in Minnesota

Buffalo Hospital is a not-for-profit regional medical center located on the western edge of the Twin Cities metropolitan area in Buffalo, Minnesota. Buffalo Hospital is part of Allina Health. Each year the hospital provides comprehensive, patient centered care to over 70,000 patients and their families.

== History ==
Buffalo Hospital was dedicated on August 26, 1951, and operations began on September 5 with 29 beds, which grew to 65 beds by 2005.
