= United Hospital =

Coordinates: 44.94319°N 93.10751°W

- Allina Health

Geography
- Location: St. Paul, Minnesota, United States

Organization
- Type: General

Services
- Standards: Joint Commission on Accreditation of Healthcare Organizations
- Emergency department: Yes
- Beds: 556

History
- Opened: 1877

Links
- Lists: Hospitals in Minnesota

United Hospital, located in St. Paul, Minnesota, is a 556-bed non-profit hospital that serves St. Paul and the eastern Twin Cities metropolitan area. United Hospital is part of Allina Health and offers specialty services including pregnancy care, birth center, behavioral health, cancer care, heart and vascular services, orthopedics and neuroscience. The hospital provides health care services to more than 200,000 people each year. United Hospital is the main hospital for the United Heart and Vascular Clinic.

== History ==
The United Hospital was first established in 1877 as St. Luke's Hospital. St. Luke's merged with Charles T. Miller Hospital in 1972 to form United Hospital.

== Peter J. King Emergency Care Center ==
United Hospital opened a new emergency department, in collaboration with Children's Hospitals and Clinics of Minnesota, in April 2011. The new emergency department includes: 27 private examination rooms, secure psychiatric rooms, a decontamination area for instances of biologic, chemical or radiation exposure, and private patient care and family areas. The center is named after Peter J. King, founder of King Capital and Peter J. King Family Foundation.
