= Allina Health =

US nonprofit health care system

Coordinates: 44°56′58″N 93°15′38″W

- Type: Nonprofit
- Industry: Health care
- Founded: 1983
- Headquarters: Midtown Exchange; Minneapolis, Minnesota
- Key people: Lisa Shannon president and CEO; Lawrence Cho executive vice president, chief strategy and growth officer; Kerri Gordon senior vice president, chief marketing, communications and public affairs officer; Sanjay Pratap Singh executive vice president, chief clinical executive; Sarah Stumme senior vice president, chief human resources officer; Dominica Tallarico executive vice president, chief operating officer; Elizabeth Truesdell Smith senior vice president, general counsel and secretary to the Allina Health Board of Directors; Doug Watson chief financial officer
- Revenue: $4 billion
- Number of employees: 29,000+
- Website: www.allinahealth.org
- Footnotes; Lisa Shannon assumes role of CEO: https://www.allinahealth.org/about-us/newsroom/2022/allina-healths-lisa-shannon-assumes-role-of-ceo

Allina Health (/əˈlaɪnə/ ə-LY-nə) is a nonprofit health care system based in Minneapolis, Minnesota, United States. It owns or operates 12 hospitals and more than 90 clinics throughout Minnesota and western Wisconsin.

Its subsidiary, Allina Medical Transportation, is accredited by both the Commission on Accreditation of Ambulance Services (CAAS), as well as the International Academies of Emergency Dispatch. Allina Medical Transportation covers eight regions and over 80 communities providing medical dispatch, 911 pre-arrival instructions, and emergency and non-emergency ambulance service. Allina’s 911 Communications Center provides 911 pre-arrival instructions and medical dispatch services to CentraCare Health EMS, Lakes Region EMS, and HealthPartners Lakeview EMS.

== History ==
In February 2012, Allina Hospitals and Clinics announced it was changing its name to Allina Health.

Allina Health had 29,382 employees in 2018.

In 2020, Allina Health spent less than half of one percent of expenses on charity care, compared to a national average for nonprofit hospitals of around two percent, while avoiding $266 million in federal, state, and local taxes the same year due to its nonprofit status.

On February 9, 2021, a mass shooting and bombing occurred at an Allina Health clinic in Buffalo, Minnesota, leaving one person dead and four critically injured.

In 2021, Allina Health paid its president $3.5 million in compensation.

In June 2023, The New York Times released an investigative report alleging that Allina refused non-emergency care for some patients with medical debt.

On March 17, 2026, Allina Health announced it was being acquired by Sutter Health.

600 Allina Health medical staff at 60 clinics in Minnesota and one clinic in Wisconsin announced they planned to go on a one-day strike in November 2025 over sick leave and safety measures.

== Hospitals ==
- Abbott Northwestern Hospital, located in Minneapolis, Minnesota
- Buffalo Hospital, located in Buffalo, Minnesota
- Cambridge Medical Center, located in Cambridge, Minnesota
- Faribault Medical Center (Formerly District One Hospital), located in Faribault, Minnesota
- Mercy Hospital – Mercy Campus, located in Coon Rapids, Minnesota
- Mercy Hospital – Unity Campus, located in Fridley, Minnesota
- New Ulm Medical Center, located in New Ulm, Minnesota
- Owatonna Hospital, located in Owatonna, Minnesota
- Phillips Eye Institute, located in Minneapolis, Minnesota
- River Falls Area Hospital, located in River Falls, Wisconsin
- St. Francis Regional Medical Center, located in Shakopee, Minnesota
- United Hospital, located in St. Paul, Minnesota
- United Hospital – Hastings Regina Campus, located in Hastings, Minnesota

== See also ==
- List of hospitals in Minnesota
- Midtown Exchange
- Courage Kenny Rehabilitation Institute
- Penny George Institute for Health and Healing
