= Virginia Triangle =

Coordinates: 44°57′59″N 93°17′18″W

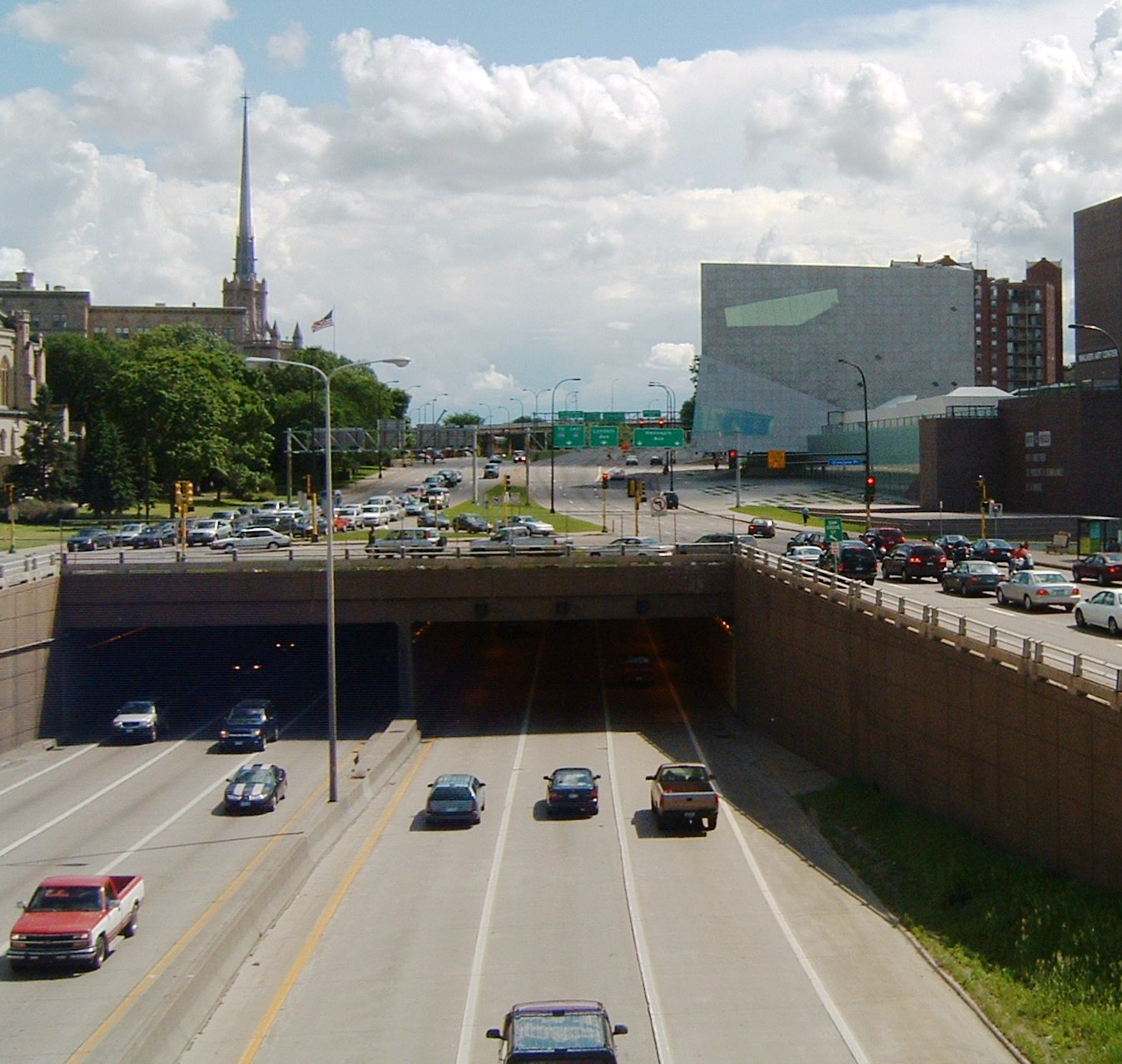
The Virginia Triangle, atop the Lowry Hill Tunnel. The Walker Art Center is at the right.

The Virginia Triangle is the commons of Hennepin and Lyndale Avenues on Lowry Hill, Minneapolis in the U.S. state of Minnesota.

Virginia Triangle was acquired by the City of Minneapolis in an exchange of real estate on January 1, 1900; a small park was formed, bounded by Hennepin Avenue to the northwest, Lyndale Avenue to the east, and Douglas Avenue to the south. A statue of Thomas Lowry was erected at the park in 1915.

Originally serviced by streetcars, the intersection was noted for having traffic problems as early as 1939. With the construction of Interstate 94 in 1967, the park was destroyed and the statue of Thomas Lowry moved to nearby Smith Triangle Park.

By the early 2000s, the area contained many on- and off-ramps and a number of large intersections, servicing Hennepin and Lyndale, as well as Interstate 94. Interstate 94 also runs directly under the site, through the Lowry Hill Tunnel. The Walker Art Center and the Basilica of Saint Mary are located adjacent to the Triangle. The park formed the tip of the Wedge neighbourhood.
