= Hennepin Avenue =

Major street in Minneapolis, USA

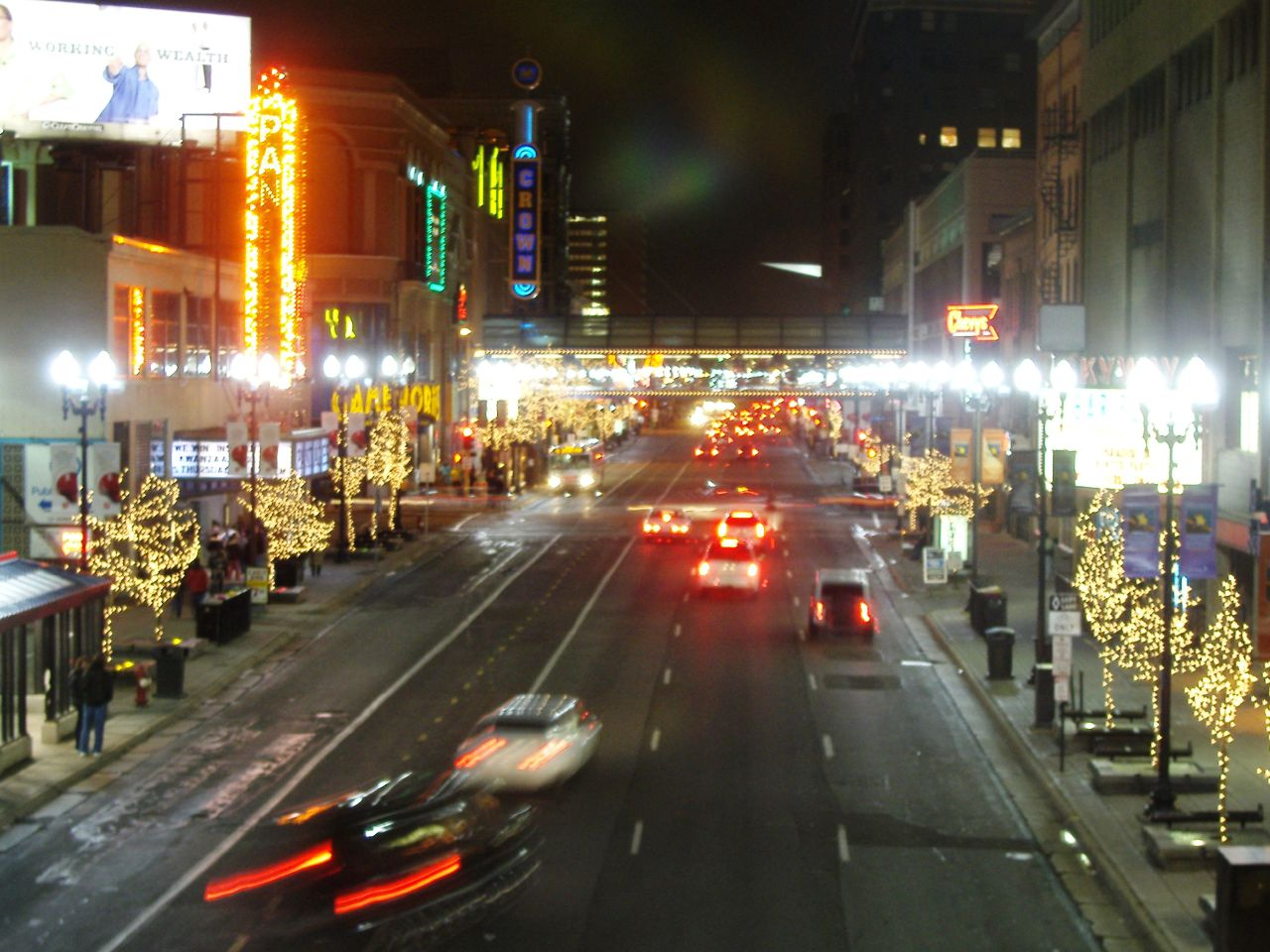
Hennepin at night under the pre-2009 lane configuration

Hennepin Avenue is a major street in Minneapolis, Minnesota, United States. It runs from Lakewood Cemetery (at West 36th Street), north through the Uptown District of Southwest Minneapolis, through the Virginia Triangle, the former "Bottleneck" area west of Loring Park. It then goes through the North Loop in the city center, to Northeast Minneapolis and the city's eastern boundary, where it becomes Larpenteur Avenue as it enters Lauderdale in Ramsey County at Highway 280. Hennepin Avenue is a Minneapolis city street south/west of Washington Avenue, and is designated as Hennepin County Road 52 from Washington Avenue to the county line.

== Cultural impact ==
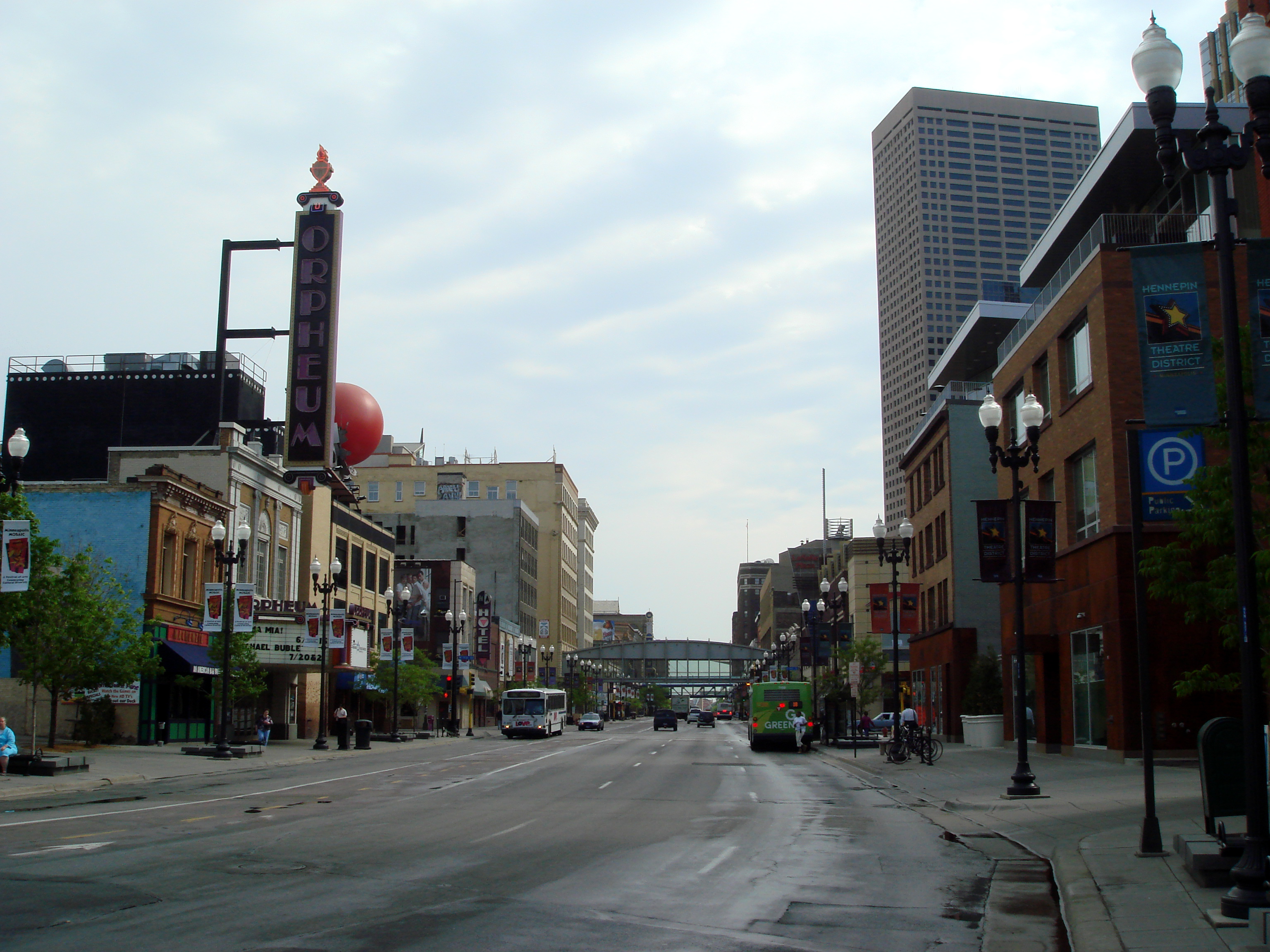
Hennepin Avenue, looking north from 10th Street into the downtown Theatre District

For sections south of the Mississippi River, Hennepin Avenue follows stretches of an old Indian trail from Saint Anthony Falls to Bde Maka Ska. It was named after Father Louis Hennepin, a Roman Catholic priest who explored the interior of North America for France while it was under French control. Hennepin Avenue is one of the oldest streets in the city and was the first road to cross the Mississippi River, in 1855, when the first Hennepin Avenue suspension bridge was completed.

In Downtown Minneapolis, Hennepin Avenue serves as a major entertainment thoroughfare, dubbed the Hennepin Theatre District. It also serves as the dividing line between "North" and "South" street addresses. Across the river, it divides "Northeast" and "Southeast" street addresses.

The Theatre District contains four historic and architecturally significant theaters for live performances: the State Theatre, the Orpheum Theatre, the Pantages Theatre and the Goodale Theater (formerly the Shubert Theatre on North 7th Street). Also, the Hennepin Center for the Arts and the Cowles Center for Dance and the Performing Arts are located on the artery.

Many important institutions and structures have been built on Hennepin, including the Minneapolis Great Northern Depot, the Uptown Theater, the Walker Art Center, the Basilica of St. Mary, St. Mark's Episcopal Cathedral, Hennepin Avenue United Methodist Church, Minneapolis Community and Technical College, Minneapolis Central Library, the Lumber Exchange Building, the Federal Reserve Bank of Minneapolis and the Suburban World Theater. One of the oldest gay bars in the city, The Saloon, is also located on Hennepin.

The street has achieved iconic status in Minneapolis culture, memorialized in songs by Tom Waits, The Hold Steady and Lucinda Williams, among others. Its 600 block downtown was once home to Block E, a sometimes-rowdy collection of bars and independent businesses ultimately acquired by the city and demolished in 1988. It is also a popular parade route, used by the annual Aquatennial celebration held in July, and since the 1990s has been the traditional route of the city's LGBTQ Pride parade.

== Infrastructure ==
Once a two-way avenue, the Theatre District portion was changed in 1980 to a one-way northbound with a bus-only lane southbound. "The Environmental Protection Agency was concerned with the air quality in downtown Minneapolis. Turning the streets into one-way lowered the near dangerous high levels of pollution". However, on October 10, 2009, it reverted to a two-way street, with its bike lanes being transferred one block west to First Avenue (which was also switched from one-way to two-way at the same time). This change was hoped by the city to create urban vibrancy, quicker travel times, and to avoid confusing one-ways. Hennepin Avenue has been under construction between Washington Avenue and 12th Street since 2019 to improve the pedestrian experience, add bikeways, and enhance transit stops. Construction will continue through 2022.

Hennepin Avenue south of downtown is a major transit thoroughfare with 400 bus trips and 3,300 rides on the street each weekday. Travel speeds in the corridor for transit were among the slowest in the Twin Cities. In the morning peak, buses accounted for 3% of vehicles in the corridor but moved 49% of people. A three day trial of bus only lanes was instituted in May 2018. Curb-side parking space was converted to bus-only lanes on portions of the route during rush hour with a northbound lane into downtown during the morning peak and southbound out of downtown in the afternoon peak. Operation on the lane was challenging with only 10-foot wide lanes. Still, during the pilot travel times were reduced by 20% when the bus lanes were in use. The lanes were made permanent with red paint in September 2019. The bus lanes on Hennepin Avenue have reduced delays by up to 36% during typical traffic days and up to 81% on days with heavy congestion or weather events. The future Metro E Line will travel on Hennepin Avenue through south Minneapolis and downtown before branching off into Marcy Holmes after crossing the Mississippi River.

The city of Minneapolis applied and was awarded $7 million in federal money for the reconstruction of the avenue in 2018. The project limits stretch from Lake Street in Uptown to just north of Franklin Avenue. This stretch of Hennepin Avenue was last reconstructed in 1957. Proposed designs for the project would add bus lanes, an off-street bike path, and wider sidewalks with space added by removing a through lane and curb-side parking. Lanes would be dedicated to buses at all times rather than the just directional peak periods that they are today. The street would be slimmed from two through lanes in each direction with parking on either side, to one through lane in each direction, a center turn lane at select intersections, a bus lane in each direction, and an off-street bike path. To accommodate the redesign, 90% of street parking on the corridor would be removed. Some business owners opposed the proposed changes and potential loss of street parking. With 3,600 parking spaces within one block of Hennepin Avenue on side streets or within parking lots, less than 10% of the area's parking is street parking directly on Hennepin Avenue. The proposed design is in line with Minneapolis city policy on Vision Zero, Complete Streets and the city's Transportation Action Plan. Every state representative and state senator from Minneapolis signed a letter of support for all day bus lanes and emphasized the need for all-day bus lanes for the success of the E Line. The $32 million reconstruction would not start until 2024.

The city council's Public Works and Infrastructure committee approved the proposed layout in May 2022. Margaret Anderson Kelliher, the city's Public Works Director reversed the city's earlier proposal of 24/7 bus lanes in favor of dynamic bus lanes that would only be reserved for transit in certain hours and used as parking during other times. A campaign to keep 24/7 bus lanes led to 20,000 emails sent to city officials and support from the Sierra Club and advocacy organizations Move Minnesota, Our Streets Minneapolis, and Hennepin For People. Objections to the removal of 24/7 bus lanes by some city council members moved the bus lane decision to the full city council where it was approved by an 8-5 vote. Mayor Jacob Frey vetoed the decision for 24/7 bus lanes and an attempt by the city council to override the veto failed by 1 vote.

A public information request for data surrounding the bus lane decision revealed that public works staff considered dynamic parking lanes to "pose a moderate to high risk" to the Metro E Line, an analysis that was not presented to the city council committee in charge of approving the design. Bus lane advocates argued that the analysis was withheld from the city council and the chair of the city council committee in charge of approving the design said the omission "raises eyebrows". Ultimately, the city council approved a plan for bus lanes that are operational six hours a day. Currently bus lanes in the corridor operate for two hours each weekday.

Construction is expected to begin in 2024 and completed after 2 years. The E Line is expected to open in 2025.

== See also ==
- Nicollet Island
- Block E (Minneapolis)

== Gallery ==
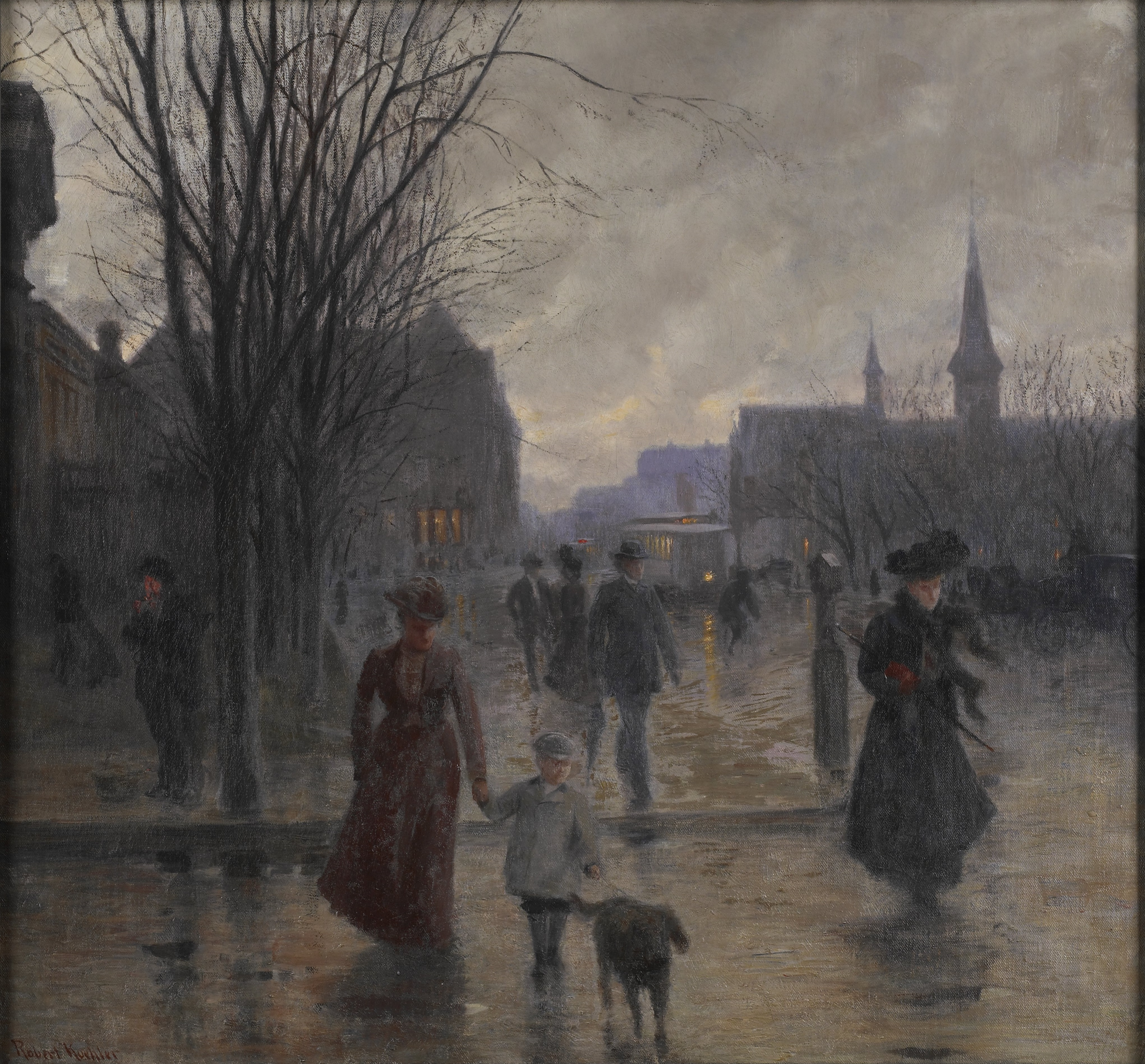
Robert Koehler painting Rainy Evening on Hennepin Avenue c. 1902. The oil on canvas original is at the Minneapolis Institute of Art

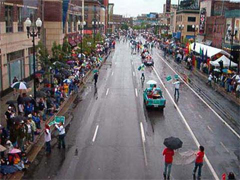
The 2002 GLBT Pride Parade on Hennepin Avenue, photographed from the skyway. The intersection shown is 9th and Hennepin, the subject of a song by the same name by Tom Waits.

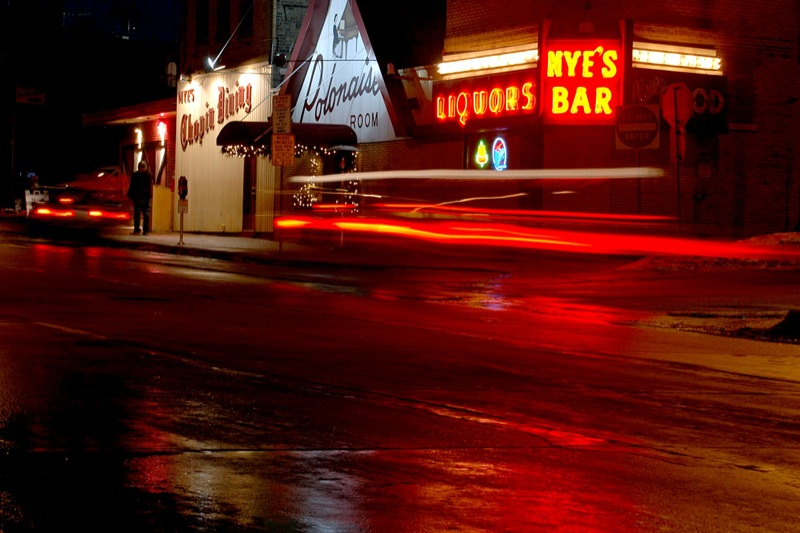
Nye's Polonaise on East Hennepin, voted "The Best Bar in America" by Esquire in 2006; partially demolished in 2016 for redevelopment and renovation
