= Highland, Wright County, Minnesota =

Unincorporated community in Minnesota, United States

Highland
- Unincorporated community
- Location within Minnesota Location within the United States
- Coordinates: 45°07′23″N 94°01′58″W
- Country: United States
- State: Minnesota
- County: Wright
- Township: Middleville Township
- Elevation: 994 ft (303 m)
- Time zone: UTC-6 (Central (CST))
  - Summer (DST): UTC-5 (CDT)
- ZIP code: 55349
- Area code: 320
- GNIS feature ID: 654755

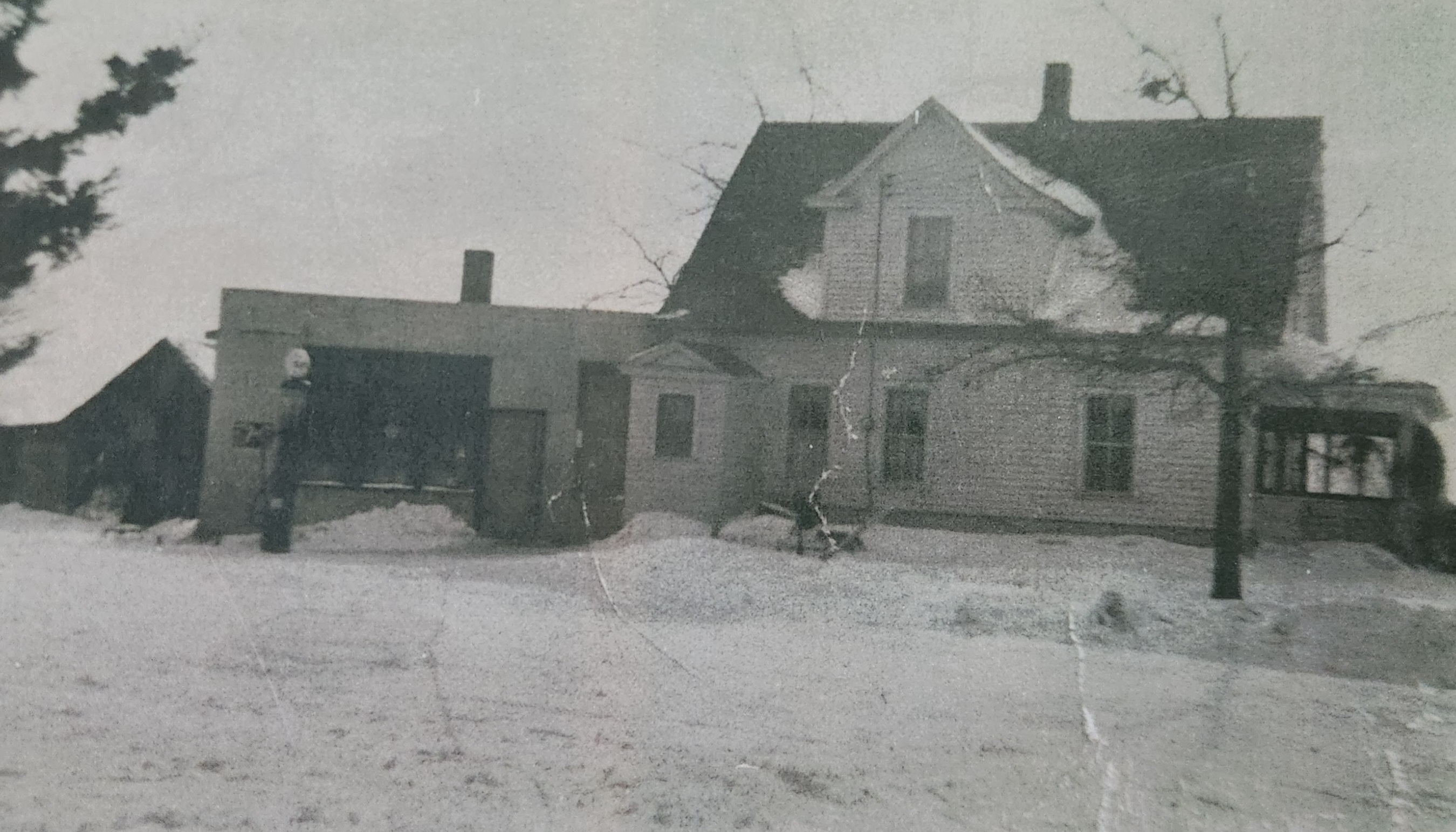
Early View of the Highland Store, C. 1915-1945

Highland is an unincorporated community in Middleville Township, Wright County, Minnesota, United States. The community is located along Wright County Road 7 near 20th Street SW.

Nearby places include Howard Lake, Waverly, Rassat, Maple Lake, and Buffalo.

== History ==
Among the first settlers to establish homes in the Highland area were Henry Moores and George Bowers. By 1879, they were joined by other families, including those of Benjamin Bowers and Joseph Anthony Johnson. Benjamin and his wife Sarah made the trek from Ohio to Minnesota in a covered wagon, while Joseph and wife Hannah (also from Ohio) traveled via the railroad. By renting several railroad cars, the Johnsons were able to transport their farm equipment, cows, horses, and furniture with them to this new land. Other names included in the list of early settlers were Borrell, Mellin, Parker, Berg, Smith, Riley Anders, Barton, Isaac Moore and Mr. Horton. A common bond shared by many of the first pioneers of Highland (and other residents throughout Middleville Township) was their religion. They were of the Quaker faith, also known as Society of Friends. Three churches, or "meeting houses", were constructed in the township between 1871 and 1879 by the Quakers. The first one was built near Howard Lake in 1871. Daniel McPherson led the early services there. The second meeting house was erected in Section 11 during the year 1877. Two years later, a third meeting house was built in Section 5. That area, known as Sylvan, is located approximately three miles west of Highland. A cemetery was also laid out in that location. These three churches were later combined, and formed a Union

Some other early prominent members of this religious group were the Jonathon Dix family, the Burcham family and the Hiatt family. Although these churches were at times without a pastor, they continued to carry out various functions. A prime example of this is evidenced by a marriage certificate found at Howard Lake. The marriage plans of John Warrall and his bride-to-be were announced in the meeting house for three weeks prior to the wedding date. The big day arrived, and although there was no minister present, the couple went through the ceremony, as usual. All members of the congregation who had attended the wedding signed the marriage certificate as witnesses of the union. Sometime during the 1930s, a new road was built through the Highland territory, County Road Ty. However, the proposed route passed through the Highland Quaker Cemetery, so the bodies had to be reburied elsewhere. The County Commissioners purchased 12 cemetery plots at the Howard Lake Cemetery for this purpose, although only seven coffins were found and moved.

Education was always of major importance to the Quaker people. They also believed strongly in women's right to a good education, a belief which was not necessarily popular in all parts of society during that era. Miss Cordelia Johnson (later married to Isaac Moore) taught the school. A brief description of the Highland School is provided in the book, History of Wright County, Minnesota Vol. II, which was published in 1915. It reads as follows: "Situated on S.W. of N.W. 14 of Section 12. Schoolhouse old but recently thoroughly repaired; large and roomy. School equipped for special state aid." The business district comprised just two establishments: a general store and the creamery. Not much information is available as to when these businesses were started, or when the creamery operations were discontinued, but the list of owners of the general store is as follows: Mr. and Mrs. Tomlin-son were the first proprietors, followed by their son, Maurice. A brother and sister team (Mauritz Anderson and Maude Anderson) were the next owners. It was then purchased by Charlie Anderson, who remained in the business for 40 years. The store was next sold to Jack and Dorothy Harmon and is currently owned by Mr. and Mrs. Christensen. The creamery was owned and operated by Maurice Tomlinson. The last buttermaker was Bill Larson, who spent between 25 and 30 years as an employee there. Since the creamery closed, the structure has been used for other business purposes. It has housed a blacksmith shop and service garage and is currently leased to the Wright County Community Action Center for use as a recycling plant.

In 1881, a diphtheria epidemic hit the community, claiming the lives of several children.

There was crime. The following accounts are from the History of Wright County, Minnesota Vol. II: Sarah 'X' and her new-born baby were killed by Sarah's husband, Frederick T. 'X', in the town of Middleville. 'Mr. X' had been released from an asylum and for some time had terrorized his neighbors by indiscriminate shooting. The trial showed that sometime during the night of March 19, 1897, 'Mr. X' had killed his wife and new-born baby, and had horribly mutilated at least one of the bodies. He was indicted for murder in the first degree, and pled guilty to murder in the third degree, and on June 19, 1897, was sentenced to the full term of thirty years in the state's prison. He spent a considerable part of his time in the asylum for the criminal insane. The murder of William T. XX*, and his young wife, Lydia M, on the night of May 15, 1899, at their home in Middleville, a mile west of Howard Lake, caused a turmoil throughout Wright County which did not subside for several years. On the night in question, the two young sons, George and Robert, went fishing. Upon their return at midnight they found the house dark and the doors locked. Frightened, they went to the home of their brother, Joseph, who lived three-quarters of a mile away. Two other neighbors were also aroused. In making their way to the XX home on horseback, the three men found the body of William T. XX a few rods from the house, lying in the road, clad only in a shirt, and with his head split with an axe. Walls and floors were splattered with blood and there were signs of a struggle. The theory was that Mr. XX had been stunned and left for dead in the house, but that upon regaining consciousness he had staggered down the road and had been overtaken and killed. There were many suspicions and several arrests. Two sons and a son-in-law were indicted for this crime. After a 19-day court session one case resulted in an acquittal, and the other two cases were dismissed. The murders remained unsolved, and created a great deal of bitterness among the community.

A post office was never established in the town of Highland, but there were several offices in the township. The closest was at the home of postmaster Henry Boam, in section 10. This was known as the Middleville Post Office and was established about 1869 or 1870. (Another post office named Middleville already existed in Victor township, but in January 1870 that office was moved to Howard Lake and became known as the Howard Lake Post Office). Highland residents are now served by Howard Lake's Post Office. Swedish immigrants settled in the area about 1890. Around the turn of the century, the Highland Lutheran Church was erected. The last pastor to serve the congregation was Reverend Sand. Services were ended about 1940-50, although the people have gathered together once each year since then to hear a sermon at their old church.
