= Hasty, Minnesota =

Unincorporated community in Minnesota, United States

Hasty
- Unincorporated community
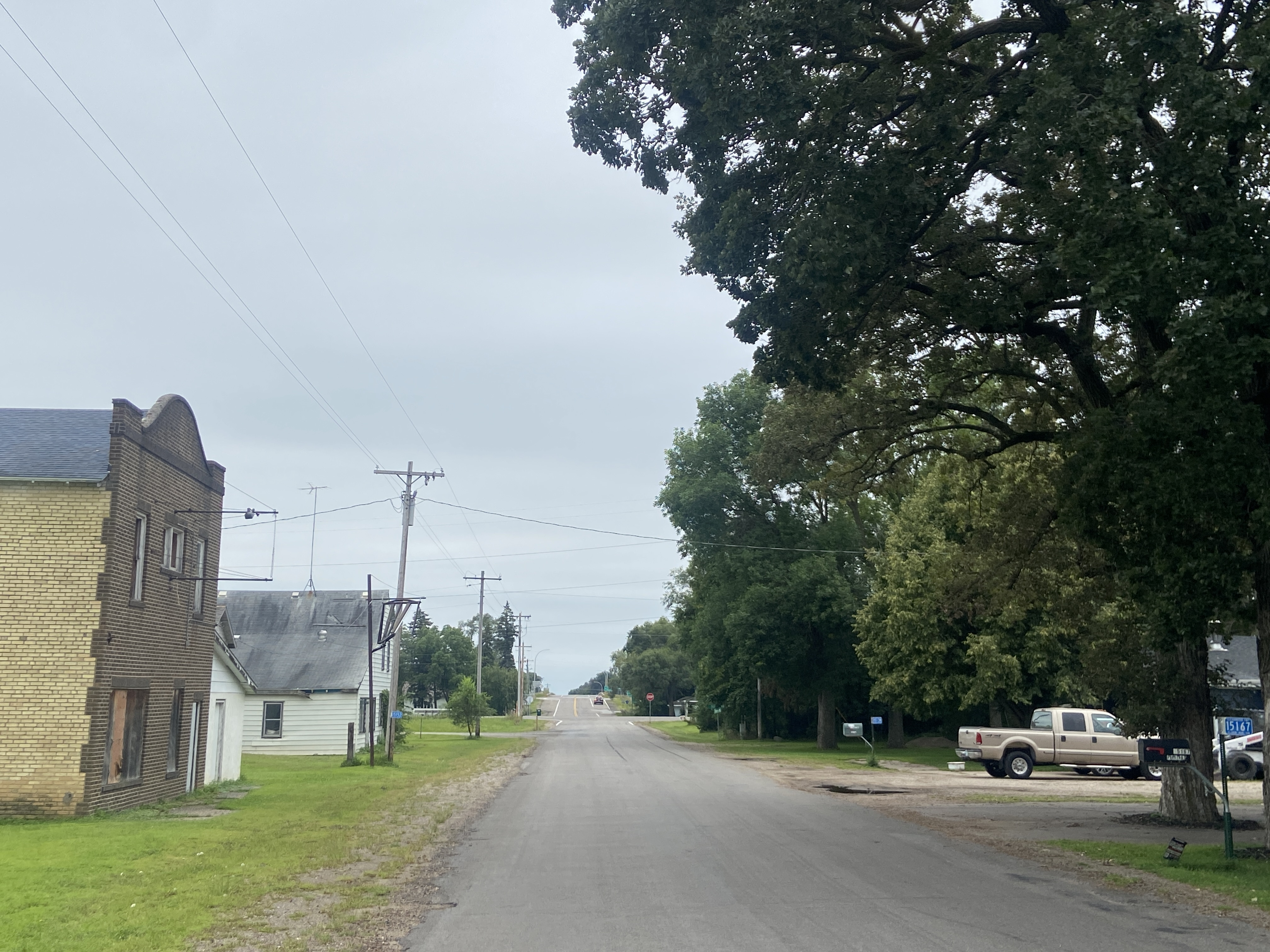
- County Road 8 looking north

- Location within Minnesota Location within the United States
- Coordinates: 45°22′16″N 93°58′23″W
- Country: United States
- State: Minnesota
- County: Wright
- Township: Clearwater Township and Silver Creek Township
- Elevation: 981 ft (299 m)
- Time zone: UTC-6 (Central (CST))
  - Summer (DST): UTC-5 (CDT)
- ZIP code: 55320 and 55362
- Area code: 763
- GNIS feature ID: 644716

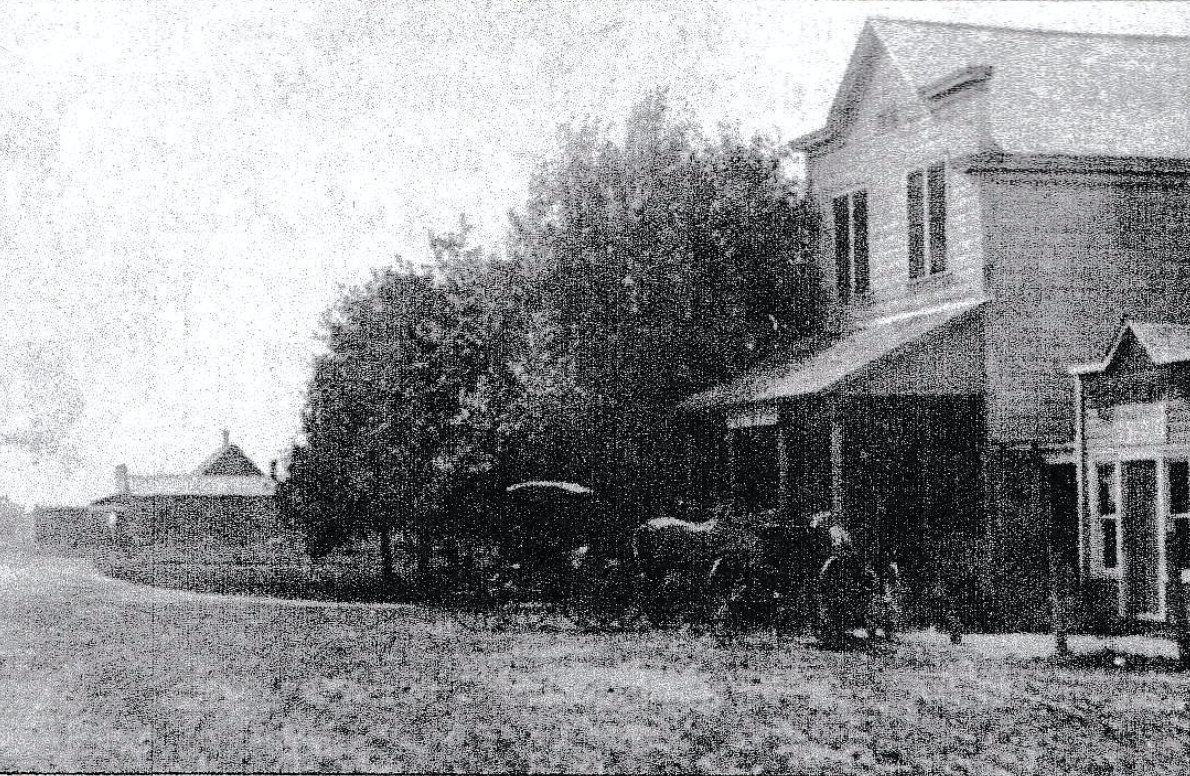
Hasty, Minn. 1900s

Hasty is an unincorporated community in Wright County, Minnesota, United States. The community is near the junction of Interstate 94 and Wright County Road 8. Hasty is within Clearwater Township and Silver Creek Township.

Nearby places include Clearwater, Monticello, Silver Creek, Maple Lake, and Lake Maria State Park. Wright County Road 75 and 150th Street NW are also in the immediate area.

== History ==
Lasting well into the late twentieth century, the small hamlet of Hasty began over one hundred years ago on early settler Warren Hasty's farm. The railroad routed through the area in 1881, and in 1888 a depot was con-to structed. Residents from nearby Silver Creek wanted to name the station "Silver Creek." They thought the name would serve as a waypoint for travelers who might not otherwise ch know about their town. That bid was not successful, and the town became known as Hasty. The Hasty post office was established in 1899 and was discontinued in 1954. A first post office in the area had been established in 1887 as Lund and lasted just a year. The com-munity itself was active far beyond the post office years. For a short while, in 1890, a brickyard was in operation and was said to ship out three or four carloads daily. In 1903 a creamery, hardware and telephone exchange joined the growing community. Soon after, a lumberyard, restaurant, and Community Hall (Sonsteby Hall) were active as well.
