= Tornado outbreak of July 1–3, 1997 =

Weather event in the United States

Meteorological history
- Duration: July 1–3, 1997

Tornado outbreak
- Tornadoes: 52 confirmed
- Max. rating: F3 tornado
- Duration: ~Three days
- Highest winds: 109 miles per hour (175 km/h) straight-line winds near Monticello, Minnesota on July 1

Overall effects
- Casualties: 2 fatalities (+5 non-tornadic), 100 injuries
- Damage: $135 million (1997 USD) $230 million (2021 USD)
- Areas affected: Midwest, Great Lakes

A destructive tornado outbreak occurred on July 2, 1997, in the built-up area of Detroit, Michigan. There were 13 tornadoes in total, 3 dragged through neighborhoods and downtown, hitting Detroit’s West Side between I-96 and Eight Mile Road, Hamtramck and Highland Park. The storms killed 7, caused local flooding, and destroyed houses. 5 of the fatalities were recorded in Grosse Pointe Farms, Michigan, due to straight-line winds of up to 100 mph that blew a gazebo full of people into Lake St. Clair. One tornado formed east of the Detroit River, in Essex County, Ontario, near Windsor, Ontario and caused damage in Windsor and Essex County. The strongest tornado was listed as an F3.

== Confirmed tornadoes ==
Confirmed tornadoes by Fujita rating
FU	F0	F1	F2	F3	F4	F5	Total
0	13	26	9	4	0	0	52

=== July 1 event ===
F#	Location	County	Time (UTC)	Path length	Damage
Kansas
F1	E of Woodlawn	Nemaha	1015	2 miles (3.2 km)	Four barns and a machine shed were destroyed, and a hay wagon was tossed some distance into a field.
Minnesota
F1	SE of Glenwood	Pope	2135	0.1 miles (0.16 km)	
F1	Willmar area	Kandiyohi	2245	1 miles (1.6 km)	A warehouse was destroyed and the roof of a motel was damaged.
F1	SW of Spicer	Kandiyohi	2250	2 miles (3.2 km)	Cabins and boat docks were damaged.
F0	W of Mentor	Polk	2307	0.2 miles (0.32 km)	
F0	SE of Crow River	Meeker	2315	0.5 miles (0.8 km)	Caused damage to trees.
F0	W of Dassel	Meeker	2335	3 miles (4.8 km)	One barn was damaged and a tree was blown into a house.
F0	SW of Terrebonne	Red Lake	2340	0.2 miles (0.32 km)	
F3	E of Rassat	Wright	2343	5 miles (8 km)	One home was completely destroyed.
F1	W of Waverly	Wright	0000	1 miles (1.6 km)	Garages and barns were blown down, and some structures sustained roof damage.
F2	W of Monticello	Wright	0010	5 miles (8 km)	
F2	Monticello	Wright	0010	2 miles (3.2 km)	Two tornadoes merged and caused extensive damage in the Monticello area. Homes in town lost their roofs, and many trees and power lines were downed. Damage was initially believed to have been a result of straight-line winds, though it was re-evaluated as an F2 tornado post-survey.
F0	Red Lake Falls area	Red Lake	0050	0.2 miles (0.32 km)	
F1	N of St. Francis	Anoka, Isanti	0052	10 miles (16 km)	One barn collapsed
F0	Dorothy area	Red Lake	0113	0.2 miles (0.32 km)	
F1	E of Forest Lake	Washington	0115	1 miles (1.6 km)	Brief tornado with unknown damage.
F0	N of Rock Creek	Pine	0204	4 miles (6.4 km)	Weak tornado in a rural area did not cause any damage.
F0	N of Olivia	Renville	0259	0.1 miles (0.16 km)	
F0	NE of Blomkest	Kandiyohi	0315	0.1 miles (0.16 km)	
Wisconsin
F1	SW of Conrath	Rusk	0444	1 miles (1.6 km)	A farmhouse lost its roof.
Source: Tornado History Project - July 1, 1997 Storm Data

=== July 2 event ===
F#	Location	County	Time (UTC)	Path length	Damage
Michigan
F1	NE of Roscommon	Crawford, Oscoda	1900	13 miles (20.8 km)	Damage mainly to trees including in the Huron National Forest. One home was destroyed as well.
F1	W of Chesaning	Saginaw	1941	2 miles (3.2 km)	A house lost 6 windows and sustained damage to its porch. Trees were downed and a garage was destroyed. Many cable and power lines were broken as well.
F1	SW of Chesaning	Saginaw	1950	0.3 miles (0.5 km)	Tornado tore siding from a house and garage and downed a tree. A wooden playhouse was thrown 20 feet.
F1	NE of Layton Corners	Saginaw	2010	2 miles (3.2 km)	Worst damage was in the Maple Grove area. Tornado destroyed two barns and downed many trees in a neighborhood.
F1	E of Au Gres	Arenac	2015	3 miles (4.8 km)	Three homes were destroyed and several others were damaged.
F1	NW of Morseville	Genesee	2020	0.3 miles (0.5 km)	Tornado downed trees and caused roof damage to a house.
F1	E of Montrose	Genesee	2020	2 miles (3.2 km)	Numerous trees were downed.
F1	NE of Burt	Saginaw	2020	1.5 miles (1.4 km)	Tornado damaged a single house, where windows were blown out and the roof was damaged. A tree was downed and a playhouse was damaged as well.
F3	SE of Clio	Genesee	2030	2 miles (3.2 km)	Two homes and a bar were heavily damaged or destroyed. A billboard was blown over, with its steel support beams severely bent. Trees and power poles were downed as well.
F1	Oak Grove area	Livingston	2041	10 miles (16 km)	Extensive tree damage occurred, and hay wagons were flipped. One wagon that was thrown was never located. A house under construction lost its roof as well.
F3	E of Thetford Center	Genesee	2045	1.7 miles (2.7 km)	1 death - Several homes were heavily damaged or destroyed, including one that was blown from its foundation. Barns and outbuildings were destroyed, and several metal high-tension towers were destroyed. Two cement silos had their tops ripped off. Trees were also downed, one of which landed on a house, resulting in a fatality.
F1	NE of Columbiaville	Lapeer	2115	1 miles (1.6 km)	Tornado threw boats onto the beach at Miller Lake and snapped numerous trees. Picnic tables were smashed and travel trailers were damaged as well.
F1	NE of Holly	Oakland	2132	0.3 miles (0.5 km)	1 death - 2 mobile home parks were heavily damaged, with several mobile homes being damaged or destroyed by the winds and/or by rolling trailers. Most of the trailers were not tied down.
F2	Detroit area	Wayne	2200	5 miles (8 km)	Affected portions of the city of Detroit. 90 people were injured. Damage amounts was estimated at $100 million. The towns of Hamtramck and Highland Park were also heavily affected. Some homes lost their roofs or were shifted from their foundations. Many trees and power lines were downed as well.
F0	SE of Romeo	Macomb	2213	0.7 miles (1.1 km)	
Indiana
F0	E of Noblesville	Hamilton	2012	0.5 miles (0.8 km)	Damaged a barn, an outbuilding, and trees.
F2	Anderson area	Madison	2040	5 miles (8 km)	35 homes and one business were damaged.
F0	New Castle area	Henry	2104	0.1 miles (0.16 km)	Damage was limited to trees.
Ontario
F1	Merlin/Erieau area	Essex, Kent	2030	18.8 miles (30 km)	Some structures lost their roofs and barns were destroyed.
Ohio
F0	Dublin area	Franklin	2230	0.2 miles (0.32 km)	Caused minor damage to several homes and blew down numerous trees.
F2	E of Xenia	Greene	2300	0.2 miles (0.32 km)	A house was blown off its foundation and moved 35 feet away.
F3	Felicity area	Clermont	0030	12 miles (19.2 km)	Major damage occurred in the Felicity area. 56 mobile homes and 27 permanent homes were damaged or destroyed. Barns and sheds were also destroyed.
Source: Tornado History Project - July 2, 1997 Storm Data, 1997 Ontario tornadoes

=== July 3 event ===
F#	Location	County	Time (UTC)	Path length	Damage
New York
F1	E of Pumpkin Hollow	Columbia	2123	5.3 miles (8.5 km)	Two houses and a barn were damaged.
F1	S of Queechy	Columbia	2317	1.2 miles (1.9 km)	Several residences were damaged and a carport was moved.
F2	N of Cannan Center	Columbia, NY, Berkshire, MA	2320	1.5 miles (2.4 km)	In New York state, four greenhouse structures were damaged while a three-story home had its roof blown off and the garage completely destroyed and removed from its foundation. One home in Massachusetts was damaged.
Massachusetts
F1	SE of North Adams	Berkshire	2136	1.3 miles (2.1 km)	One home lost most of its roof shingles, and the steeple of a church was blown off.
F1	W of Colrain	Franklin	2158	4.5 miles (7.2 km)	Extensive tree damage occurred, a silo was destroyed, the roof of a barn was damaged, and a tractor was flipped over.
F2	NW of Hephzibah Heights	Berkshire	2205	4.5 miles (7.2 km)	10 to 20 homes were heavily damaged.
F2	N of West Otis	Berkshire	2211	3.7 miles (5.9 km)	15 to 20 homes were damaged.
F1	W of Griswoldville	Franklin	2258	8.5 miles (13.6 km)	15 trailers at a campground were damaged, including one that was destroyed.
New Hampshire
F1	SE of Swanzey	Cheshire	2313	2 miles (3.2 km)	A house barn was destroyed and an ice arena was damaged. Extensive tree damage occurred as well.
F2	E of Greenfield	Hillsborough	2355	2 miles (3.2 km)	A recycling facility was destroyed. Buildings at a campground, wood and aluminium buildings, and a sawmill were damaged.
Source: Tornado History Project - July 3, 1997 Storm Data

== Other tornadoes ==
The Michigan tornado outbreak of July 2 was part of a larger outbreak stemming from a storm system that crossed the eastern part of North America from July 1 to July 3, 1997. On July 1, several tornadoes touched down across western and northern Minnesota north of the Twin Cities Metropolitan Area of Minneapolis and St. Paul. On July 3, several tornadoes touched down from eastern New York to southern New Hampshire. No other fatalities were reported outside of Michigan. In total, 52 tornadoes touched from northeastern Kansas to New England during the three-day event.

== Aftermath ==
Later that evening and the next day, the local television stations (such as WJBK, WDIV-TV, and WXYZ-TV) displayed video and images of downtown Detroit.

The temperatures on July 2 were very high, around 90 °F (32 °C), with a heat index close to 104 °F (40 °C). After the storm passed, the temperatures dropped to 70 °F (21 °C).

For the next 6 to 8 hours, there were still thunderstorms rolling and rumbling through, and many people were afraid of further tornadic activity, especially since two-thirds of the City of Windsor were without power until the next morning. Many large trees were felled by the storm's winds as well.

=== Tecumseh Road viaduct ===
The effects on the Tecumseh Road viaduct on the west end of Windsor, Ontario, were quite overwhelming, however. The steel girder viaduct was built in 1944, and was just two lanes, going under the CN Rail line that leads to the Michigan Central Railway Tunnel. The storms associated with the tornado outbreak dumped such a large amount of rain and floodwaters, that the viaduct was flooded up to the height of a car's roof, as one automobile was submerged (The driver was unharmed, however).

Since this viaduct was a well-known traffic bottleneck (even more so for transport trucks, since the viaduct was so low, it would peel the roof off their trailers), and would flood with around a foot of water from even a light rain, that it was completely closed, torn down, and rebuilt in August 1998, and finished 2 weeks ahead of schedule, and 2 million dollars under budget. The new underpass is built of concrete, is four lanes wide, and is designed to handle the largest of transport trucks.

== See also ==
- List of Canadian Tornadoes
- List of North American tornadoes and tornado outbreaks
- List of tornadoes striking downtown areas
- 2026 Detroit tornado, Another tornado that would hit Detroit nearly 30 years later.

== Sources ==
- WDIV-TV, NBC 4 Detroit, Michigan
- CBET-TV, CBC 9 Windsor, Ontario
