= Arnold D. Gruys =

American politician (1928–2020)

Arnold Donald Gruys (May 1, 1928 – December 17, 2020) was an American businessman and politician. He was a member of the Minnesota House of Representatives, representing District 13B from 1967 to 1970.

== Biography ==
Gruys was born in Maple Lake, Wright County, Minnesota. He lived on the farm with his family in Silver Creek Township, Wright County, Minnesota, and went to the local country school. He served in the United States Army from 1946 to 1948 and in the United States Army Reserve from 1950 to 1953. Gruys received his bachelor's degree in business and accounting from the University of Minnesota in 1951. He lived with his wife and family in Annandale, Minnesota and was in the accounting business. Gruys served in the Minnesota House of Representatives from 1967 to 1970.

Gruys died from complications of COVID-19 at St. Cloud Hospital in St. Cloud, Minnesota. He was 92.
