= Smith Lake, Minnesota =

Unincorporated community in Minnesota, United States

Smith Lake
- Unincorporated community
- Location within Minnesota Location within the United States
- Coordinates: 45°04′59″N 94°06′54″W
- Country: United States
- State: Minnesota
- County: Wright
- Township: Middleville Township
- Elevation: 1,050 ft (320 m)
- Time zone: UTC-6 (Central (CST))
  - Summer (DST): UTC-5 (CDT)
- ZIP code: 55321 and 55349
- Area code: 320
- GNIS feature ID: 654947

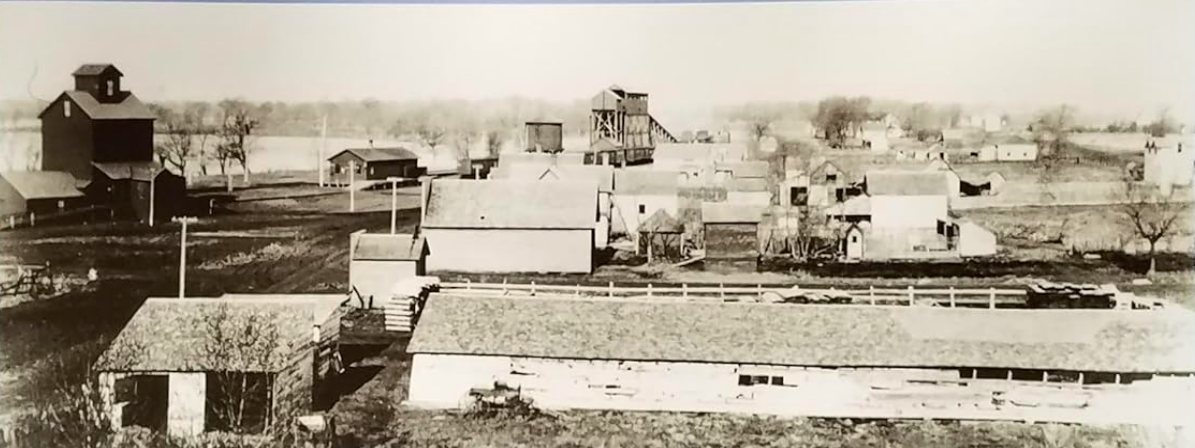
Smith Lake Bird's Eye View

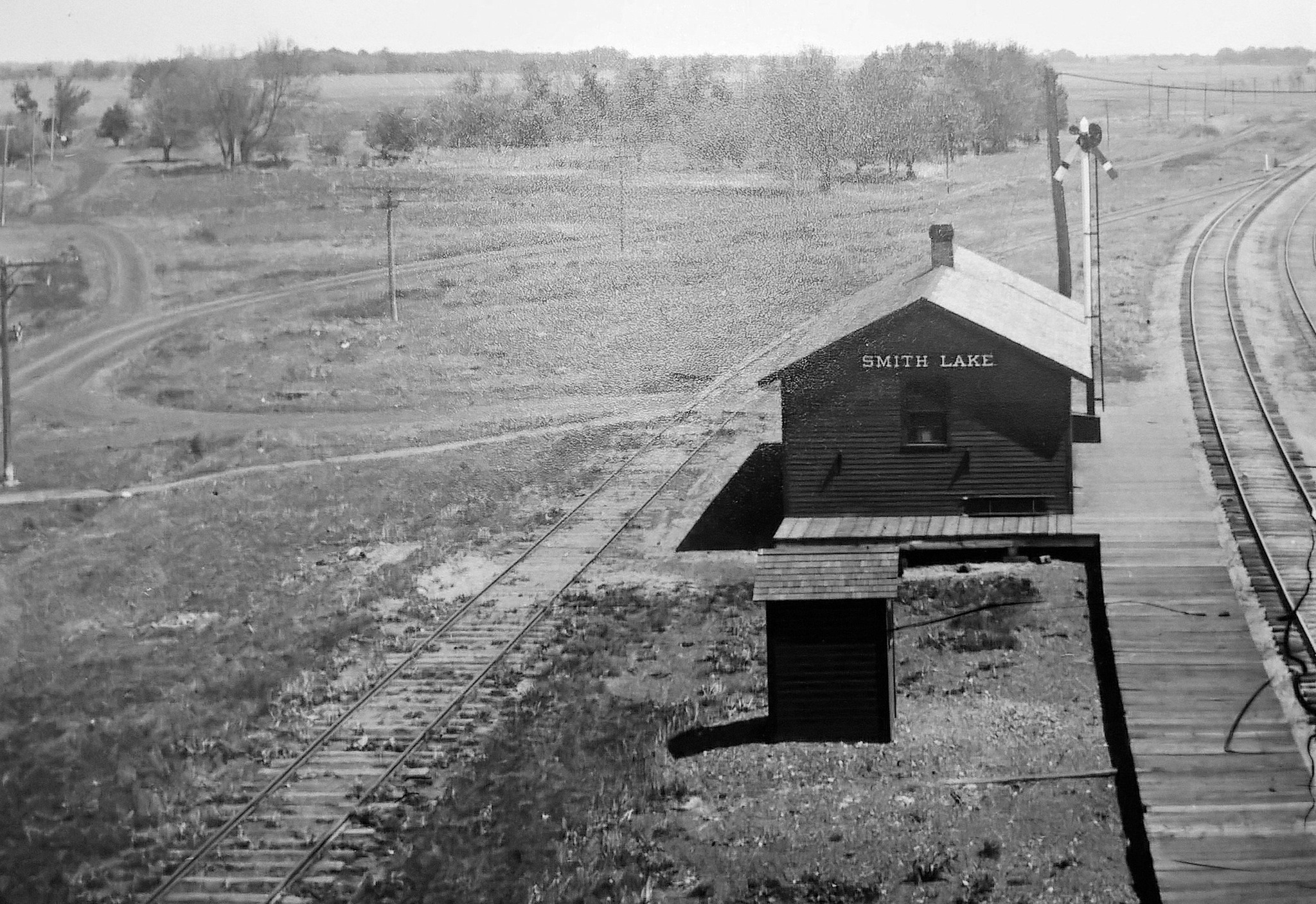
Smith Lake Depot

Smith Lake is an unincorporated community in Middleville Township, Wright County, Minnesota, United States. The community is located along Wright County Road 5 near 50th Street SW. Nearby places include Cokato and Howard Lake.

== History ==
Smith Lake was platted in 1869, and named after nearby Smith Lake. A post office was established at Smith Lake in 1871, and remained in operation until 1914.
