= Silver Creek, Wright County, Minnesota =

Unincorporated community in Minnesota, US

Silver Creek
- Census-designated place (CDP) and Unincorporated community
- Location within Minnesota Location within the United States
- Coordinates: 45°18′54″N 93°58′47″W
- Country: United States
- State: Minnesota
- County: Wright
- Township: Silver Creek Township

Area
  - Total: 1.66 sq mi (4.31 km^{2})
  - Land: 1.49 sq mi (3.86 km^{2})
  - Water: 0.17 sq mi (0.44 km^{2})
- Elevation: 991 ft (302 m)

Population (2020)
  - Total: 254
  - Density: 170.4/sq mi (65.79/km^{2})
- Time zone: UTC-6 (Central (CST))
  - Summer (DST): UTC-5 (CDT)
- ZIP code: 55380
- Area codes: 320 and 763
- FIPS code: 27-60322
- GNIS feature ID: 652026

Silver Creek is an unincorporated community and census-designated place (CDP) in Silver Creek Township, Wright County, Minnesota, United States. As of the 2010 census, its population was 256. The community is on Wright County Road 8 near 112th Street NW. Wright County Road 39 is nearby.

Nearby places include Maple Lake, Annandale, Clearwater, Hasty, Monticello, and Lake Maria State Park.

Silver Creek is six miles north of Maple Lake and 21 miles south of St. Cloud.

The community has a post office with ZIP code 55380.

== Demographics ==
Historical population
Census	Pop.	Note	%±
2010	256		—
2020	254		−0.8%
U.S. Decennial Census
