= Enfield, Minnesota =

Unincorporated community in Minnesota, United States

Enfield
- Unincorporated community
- Location within Minnesota Location within the United States
- Coordinates: 45°21′27″N 93°55′53″W
- Country: United States
- State: Minnesota
- County: Wright
- Township: Silver Creek Township
- Elevation: 1,017 ft (310 m)
- Time zone: UTC-6 (Central (CST))
  - Summer (DST): UTC-5 (CDT)
- ZIP code: 55362
- Area code: 763
- GNIS feature ID: 643374

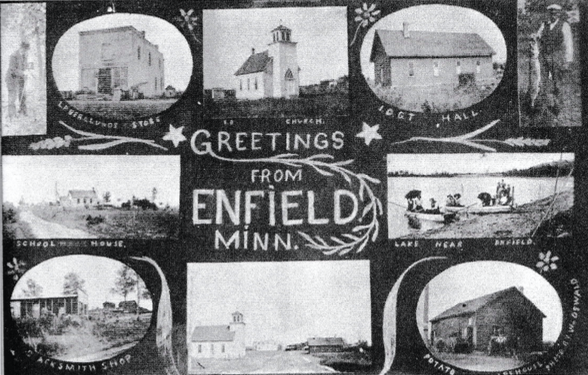
Enfield Postcard, 1910s

Enfield is an unincorporated community in Silver Creek Township, Wright County, Minnesota, United States. The community is located along Wright County Road 75 near Clementa Avenue NW. Nearby places include Hasty, Clearwater, and Monticello. Interstate 94 is nearby.

History

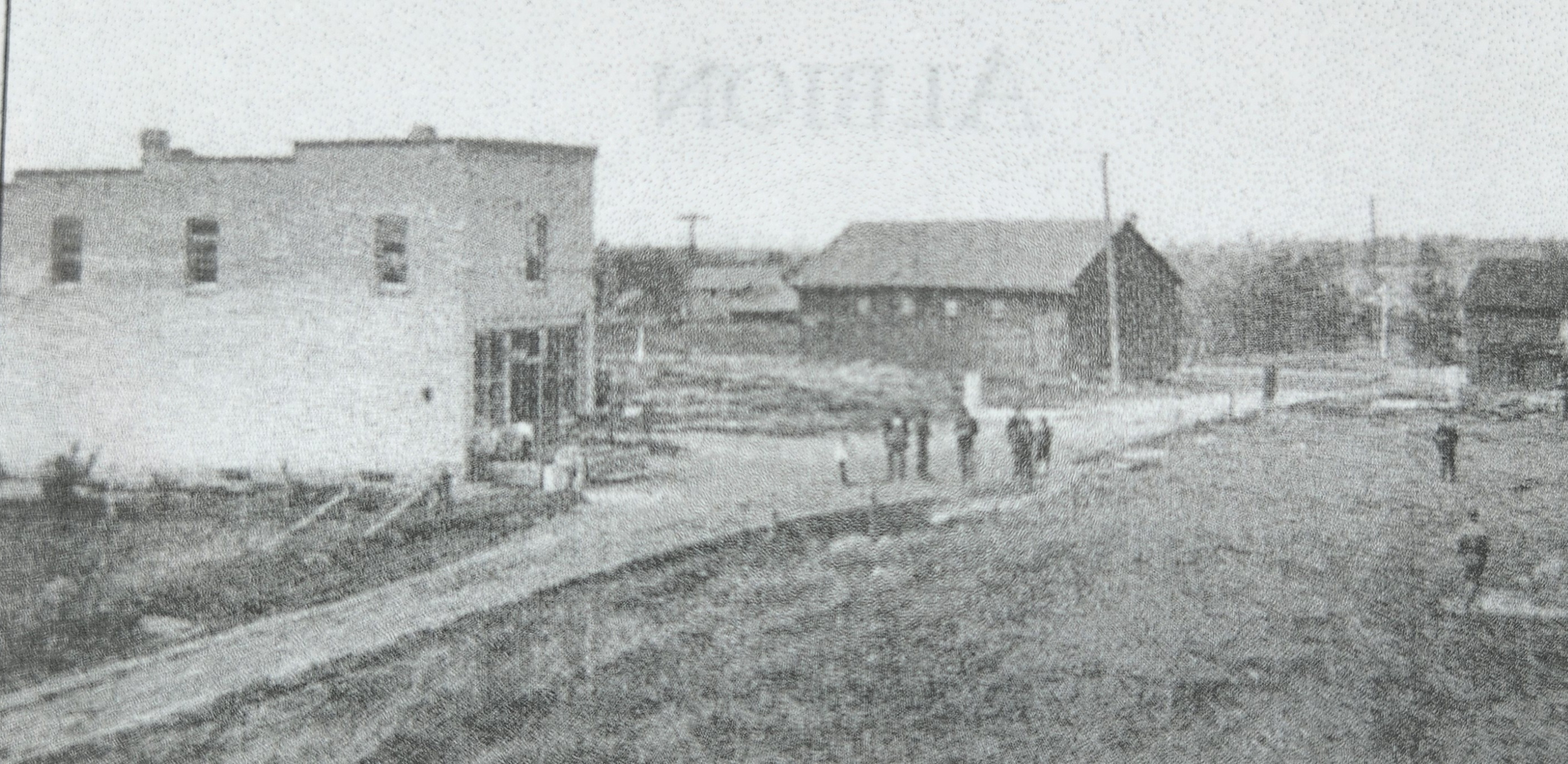
Enfield, MN. 1910

Settled by Swedish immigrants in the mid-1850s, Enfield is two miles south of Hasty. Once a busy little burg, the farming community was located along the rail lines through the area. The post office was in operation from 1910 to 1954. As auto traffic increased, small communities, like Enfield, began to decline. The completion of 1-94 further eroded the community's base. Today, a few homes, an original building or two are still standing in the former town site. Along I-94 is a spacious rural rest area which carries the Enfield name. A short distance away is the former town site.
