= Middleville =

Middleville is the name of some places in Canada & the United States of America:

- Middleville, Ontario
- Middleville, Michigan
- Middleville, New York
- Middleville Township, Minnesota
