= Fountain Lake (Wright County, Minnesota) =

Lake in the state of Minnesota, United States

- Location within Minnesota
- Location: Wright County, Minnesota
- Coordinates: 45°2′31″N 93°53′3″W
- Type: lake

Fountain Lake is a lake in Wright County, in the U.S. state of Minnesota.

Fountain Lake was so named on account of there being many springs in its vicinity.

== See also ==
- List of lakes in Minnesota
