= Albright, Minnesota =

Unincorporated community in Minnesota, United States

Albright
- Unincorporated community
- Location within Minnesota Location within the United States
- Coordinates: 45°07′46″N 94°06′52″W
- Country: United States
- State: Minnesota
- County: Wright
- Township: Middleville Township
- Elevation: 1,024 ft (312 m)
- Time zone: UTC-6 (Central (CST))
  - Summer (DST): UTC-5 (CDT)
- ZIP code: 55349
- Area code: 320
- GNIS feature ID: 654563

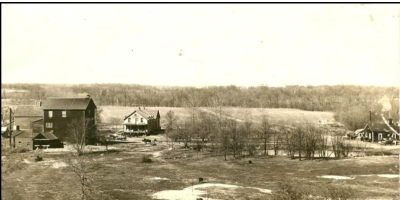
Albright, Minn

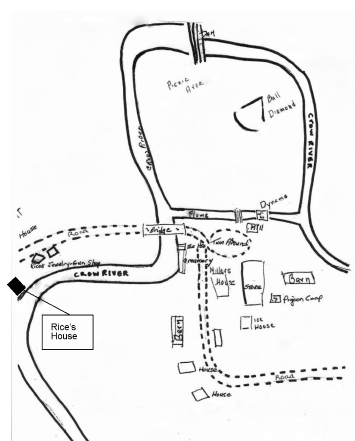
Albright Village Map

Albright, (Albrecht's Mill), is an unincorporated community in Middleville Township, Wright County, Minnesota, United States. The community is located along Wright County Road 5 near 15th Street SW. Nearby places include Howard Lake, Cokato, Albion Center, and Albright Mill County Park. The North Fork of the Crow River flows nearby.

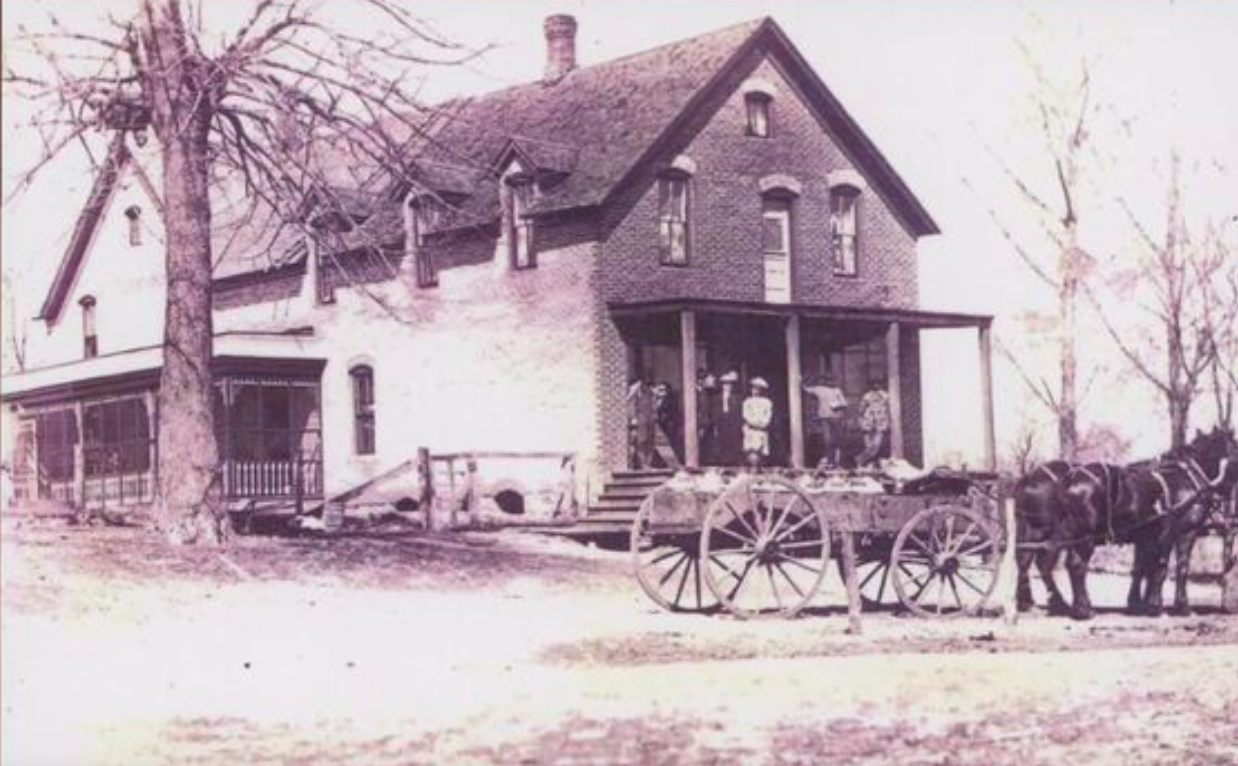
Albright Store, 1900s

== History ==
Growing quickly at first because of the grist mill, dam and bridge built in 1879, the community lasted only a few years. A creamery, general store, blacksmith, and several residences surrounded the mill. Today the area is a county park. For a time, it was named Chochrane's Mills, reflecting the owner of the mills.
