= Disappearance of Joshua Guimond =

Disappearance of American man in 2002

Coordinates: 45°35′07″N 94°23′39.5″W

Joshua Guimond
- Guimond in 2002, and with age progression
- Born: June 18, 1982
- Disappeared: November 9, 2002; Collegeville, Minnesota, U.S.
- Status: Missing for 23 years, 11 months and 21 days
- Education: Saint John's University
- Height: 5 ft 11 in - 6 ft (180-182 cm)
- Parents: Brian Guimond (father); Lisa Cheney (mother)

On the night of November 9–10, 2002, 20‑year‑old Joshua Guimond disappeared from the campus of his current school, Saint John's University in Collegeville, Minnesota, United States.

On the 9th, Guimond was partying with friends in an apartment of the Metten Court dormitory. The other attendees say that around 11:45 p.m., he left without saying anything, after implying earlier that he had some place to be. A walk back to Guimond's own dorm, St. Maur, would have taken about three minutes. Two people claim to have seen him around 12:15 to 12:30 a.m. on the 10th, walking on a bridge near Stumpf Lake, which is between the two dorms. Investigators from the Stearns County Sheriff's Office initially theorized he had fallen or was pushed into the lake.

The St. John's campus and nearby areas have been searched over the following decades, and Guimond's body has not been found. Based on conversations found on his computer, investigators now theorize he was kidnapped or picked up by a driver on the bridge. The case received renewed attention after being covered by the docuseries Unsolved Mysteries in 2022.

== Background ==
Joshua Guimond was born on June 18, 1982. His parents are Brian Guimond and Lisa Cheney. When he was four, he moved from Redwood Falls, Minnesota to Maple Lake, where he grew up. He was a valedictorian and class president of the Maple Lake High School class of 2000. Afterwards, he was a student at Saint John's University, a Catholic school in Collegeville. Saint John's is notably surrounded by 2,500 acres of woods and lakes. Guimond was an honor student who was majoring in political science, and had planned to be a lawyer or a politician. He debated in the school's Pre-Law Society, and played the baritone in their Wind Ensemble.

Leading up to November 2002, in the area around the Saint John's campus, male college students had been the subject of attacks, including attempted abductions and stalkings. At the time, Guimond was a 20-year-old junior student, and was living in a room in the St. Maur dormitory building. He is around six feet tall and has blue eyes. He had blonde hair and weighed 176 pounds. On one of his shoulders, he has a four-inch vertical scar.

== Disappearance ==
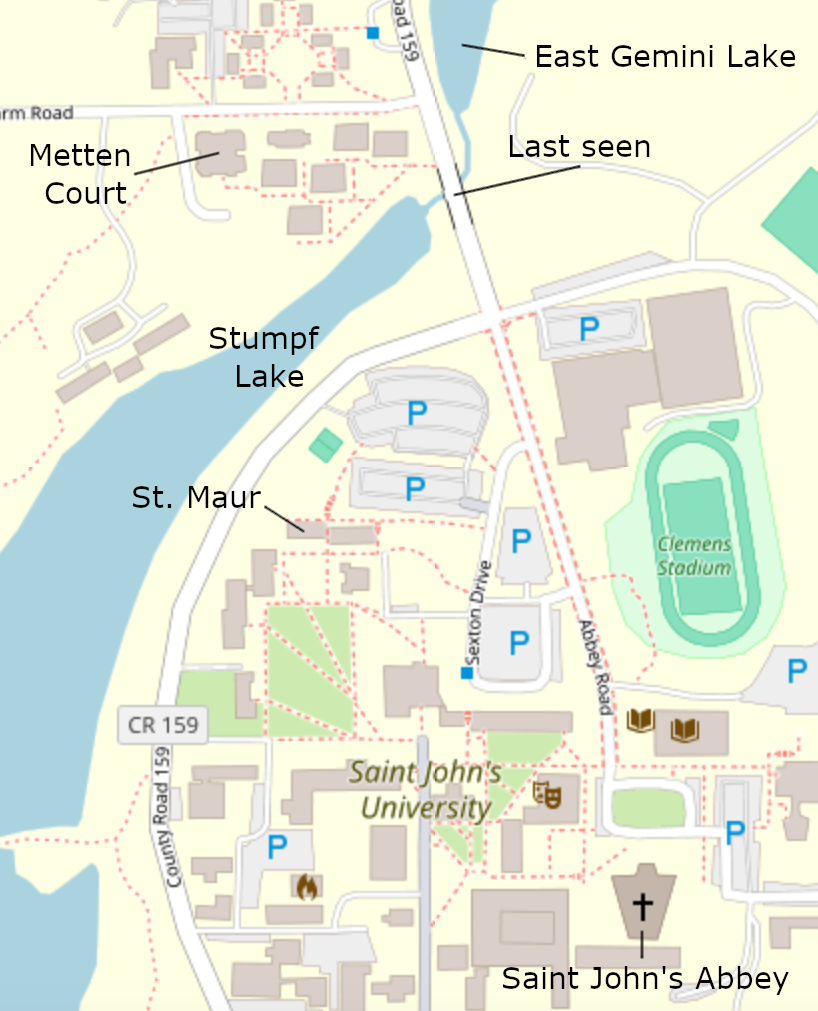
A 2024 map of Saint John's University, labeled with locations relevant to Guimond's disappearance

On the night of November 9, 2002, Guimond was writing a paper in his room at St. Maur. At 11:06 p.m., he left and walked north with his friends to go to a party in an apartment of the Metten Court dormitory building. He did not have his glasses and other important items with him, but one of the friends said nothing seemed wrong with him, that "the whole walk down there he was in a great mood".

At the apartment, he played poker with eight to ten other students. He had between seven and twelve beers, but did not seem to get intoxicated. The other students at the party said he got up and left the apartment around 11:45 p.m., without saying anything. (Note: This was not considered unusual, one of the people there said: "It's kind of like, you don't need to say 'goodbye'. I mean, we're all in college, and if you're ready to go home and go to bed, you go.") However, he had implied beforehand that he had somewhere else to be. Different sources say his friends assumed he walked south back to St. Maur, or went down the hall to use the bathroom. Many at the party did not realize he left. When he did not return, they assumed he went to sleep. He was last seen wearing blue jeans and a gray Saint John's sweatshirt, which was not appropriate clothing for spending a long amount of time in the snow.

The walk between Metten Court and St. Maur would have been about three minutes long. Between the two buildings is Stumpf Lake, (Note: Also spelled as Stump.) and the most likely path someone would travel between them includes a bridge near the lake. Two people claim to have seen Guimond walking on the bridge around 12:15 to 12:30 a.m.

=== Aftermath ===
It is unknown if Guimond returned to St. Maur. There was no activity on his credit card after he left and there were no unaccounted withdrawals from his bank account. Between 11:52 p.m. and 12:32 a.m., music had been playing on the computer in his bedroom. Some songs had been skipped, implying the computer was being physically operated at that time.

Fifteen minutes after he left, Guimond's friends attempted to call him at his dorm's phone, but received no answer. They called his mom at some point during the night, and the next morning, when they could not find him, they called other classmates. Guimond's roommate, who was also at the party, said Guimond was not in St. Maur when he returned. On the afternoon of the 10th, he failed to show up for a mock trial debate hosted by the school's Pre-Law Society, which is when his friends started worrying about him. They said they tried contacting him, and it was unusual for him to not respond. His friends then contacted either campus security or the Sheriff's Office that night, as well as his parents. His car was found, still on campus in the same spot it usually was.

Students on campus took more safety precautions, like not walking by themselves, locking their doors, and checking on their friends. Guimond's friends started an information campaign to spread awareness, including posters that were put up in an area from Fargo to the Twin Cities. For some time afterwards, a sign at an entrance to the campus had Guimond's picture and phone numbers leading to information about his disappearance.

== Investigation ==
=== Investigation ===
The disappearance was investigated by the Stearns County Sheriff's Office, the case being headed by Sheriffs Steve Soyka and Jack Kostreba. The Sheriff's Office, Federal Bureau of Investigation, Minnesota National Guard, Minnesota Bureau of Criminal Apprehension (BCA), Maple Lake Fire Department, and local volunteers helped in the investigation in different ways, including searching the campus premises. Guimond's friends, family, and others in the community were interviewed. The partygoers were interviewed two weeks after the disappearance. Helicopters searched the area with infrared imaging.

"Sheriff's officials and volunteers have spent 'thousands of hours' on the case, [Stearns County Sheriff John] Sanner said, 'and we're willing to expend thousands more to bring closure for the family'. Sanner [pointed] to a pair of three-ring notebooks filled with statements and information collected during the investigation."

— David Unze, "Guimonds ask that divers join in search", St. Cloud Times, April 2, 2003

One theory investigators considered was that Guimond had fallen into the lake that night and drowned, possibly while drunk. The first dive into Stumpf Lake by law enforcement was in November 2002. After multiple searches, Guimond's body was never found in Stumpf Lake or the nearby Gemini Lake. Underwater cameras and sonar were also used, and video was taken underwater.

In December 2002 and January 2003, bloodhounds were used to assist the searchers. There were multiple dogs used. One dog used within days of the disappearance, trained for this type of search, tracked Guimond's scent to Stumpf Lake and the nearby bridge. The Minneapolis Star Tribune questioned the credentials and reliability of one of the later dog handlers, who searched for Guimond weeks later, after his smell would have been much harder to track; this dog was also not trained for this type of search.

Even after initial dives, there was still a theory that he could be at the bottom of a nearby lake, because a body in a lake generally floats to the top when the lake is around 45 °F (7 °C). Early into the investigation, the temperature of nearby lakes were around that number; if the lake was cold, and Guimond's body was snagged by an object underwater, it would have been harder for him to float. The "Find Joshua Fund" and Brian Guimond lobbied The Trident Foundation – considered the "premier water-based crimes investigative organization" in the United States– to help search the three lakes on campus. The Foundation got permission from the school and county to search the lakes in May 2003, and found nothing. Lake Sagatagan to the south of St. Maur was searched by the Trident Foundation sometime between 2003 and 2004. In 2004, Brian Guimond went to an employee of the Minnesota Soil and Water Conservation District, Bradley Wenz, and proposed the theory that Joshua was at the bottom of a lake. Wenz responded that in Stearns County, there had not been soil discovered "capable of drawing someone in". Soyka ruled out the theory that Joshua had drowned by 2022; despite this, as recently as around 2023, Collegeville's surrounding lakes and river were searched by police and citizens.

Investigators also considered that Guimond ran away or died by suicide. There's no evidence that he was suicidal or attempted suicide before the disappearance. He had broken up with his girlfriend the month before, but remained good friends with her. He had also been doing well in school. From the start of the case, Guimond's parents believed that he was kidnapped, and that someone on campus had relevant information, which the police denied suspecting. In 2003, Stearns County Sheriff John Sanner said that Guimond was considered a missing person, but that there was no evidence of foul play. In 2005, Sanner said that he possibly could have been abducted, and that the leads in the case amounted to "almost nothing".

In 2025, law enforcement renewed a public request for information regarding Guimond's disappearance.

=== Possible connections to other crimes ===
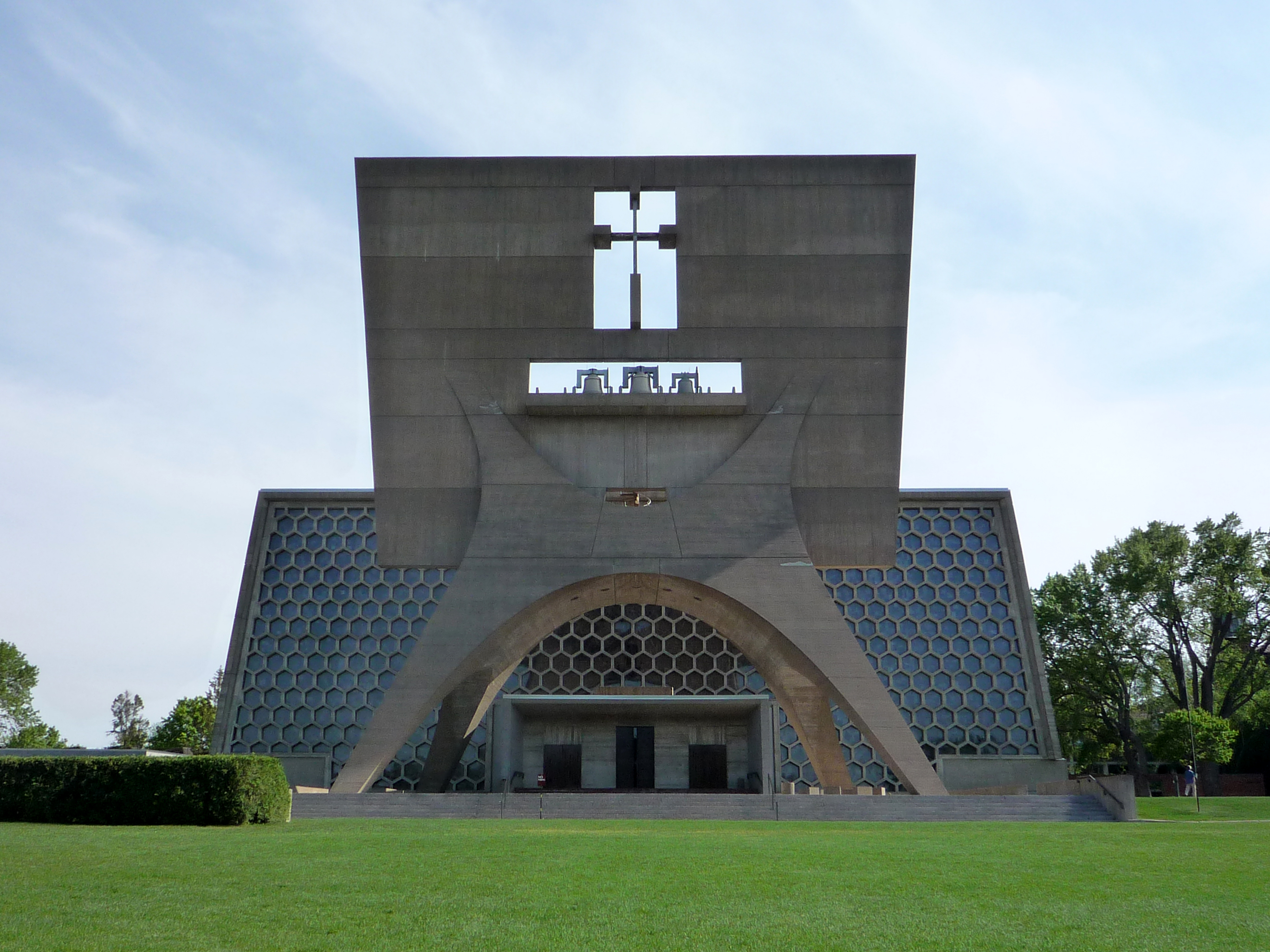
Saint John's Abbey, the monastery where Guimond's scent was tracked

In 2003, Brian Guimond cited as evidence of malicious intent the disappearance of Jacob Wetterling in 1989 – also in Stearns County – and the scandal regarding sexual abuse by monks living at Saint John's Abbey, a monastery connected to the campus. The scandal made headlines in October 2002, when St. John's settled a dozen lawsuits regarding the abuse. Joshua at some point had discovered the monks also lived in Metten Court and St. Maur. His friends and family say the abuse "outraged" him, and he had done internet searches about the scandal on his computer. Bloodhounds tracked his scent to the abbey. Theories regarding a possible connection between the events were investigated by police. In 2023, Soyka stated the Sheriff's Office investigation was not focused in that direction, saying there was no credible evidence of a connection. Sheriff Andrew Struffert said the investigation into the abbey and its related buildings were thorough. Minnesota man Danny Heinrich eventually admitted to murdering Jacob Wetterling, and showed authorities Wetterling's burial site in the Paynesville area in 2016.

Guimond's disappearance came in the context of three other disappearances that had happened in the previous 10 days: on October 30, 2002, telemarketer Erika Dalquist had disappeared from a bar 127 miles northwest of Minneapolis that was commonly frequented by college students. Christopher Jenkins, a University of Minnesota student, disappeared after leaving a bar in Minneapolis on November 1, and Michael Noll, a University of Wisconsin Eau-Claire student, disappeared on November 6 after visiting a bar in Eau Claire, Wisconsin. The victims' families suspected a link between the cases, and called for a task force to investigate it. Some investigators also suspected a connection, but Sergeant Bruce Bechtold of the Sheriff's Department denied one. The possible connection between the cases brought attention to Guimond's case. In December 2002, a dog which was used to search for Jenkins found his scent on the Saint John's campus. In 2003, Jenkins' body was found in the Mississippi River, and Noll's body was found in a lake in Eau Claire. The discovery of the bodies gave credence to a theory that Guimond was pushed into a lake, and that possibly all three deaths had been the work of a serial killer. Both deaths were labeled as accidental drownings, though Jenkins' death was relabeled as a homicide in 2006. Dalquist's body was found in a shallow grave in 2004, on the property of her convicted murderer, William Myears.

=== Computer contents ===
Investigators looked at the contents of Guimond's computer in his St. Maur bedroom. After he disappeared, police had not closed off his bedroom as a crime scene, so anybody had the ability to access his computer. Data was found to have been wiped from the computer's browser, and the program that performed the wipe was used days after the disappearance.

In 2008, investigators recovered data from Guimond's browser. Information on making fake ID cards had been erased. They also found he had been talking to other men on Yahoo! Personals under the persona of a woman; his friends did not recognize the picture he used, a blonde woman he named Gwen. Investigators thought he may have been exploring his sexuality this way, and that he possibly met one of the men in-person. They theorized he was abducted or went into a stranger's car on the lake bridge. In 2022, an investigator said the "most likely avenue or theory" regarding the case was that Guimond met someone from a dating site who was responsible for him disappearing.

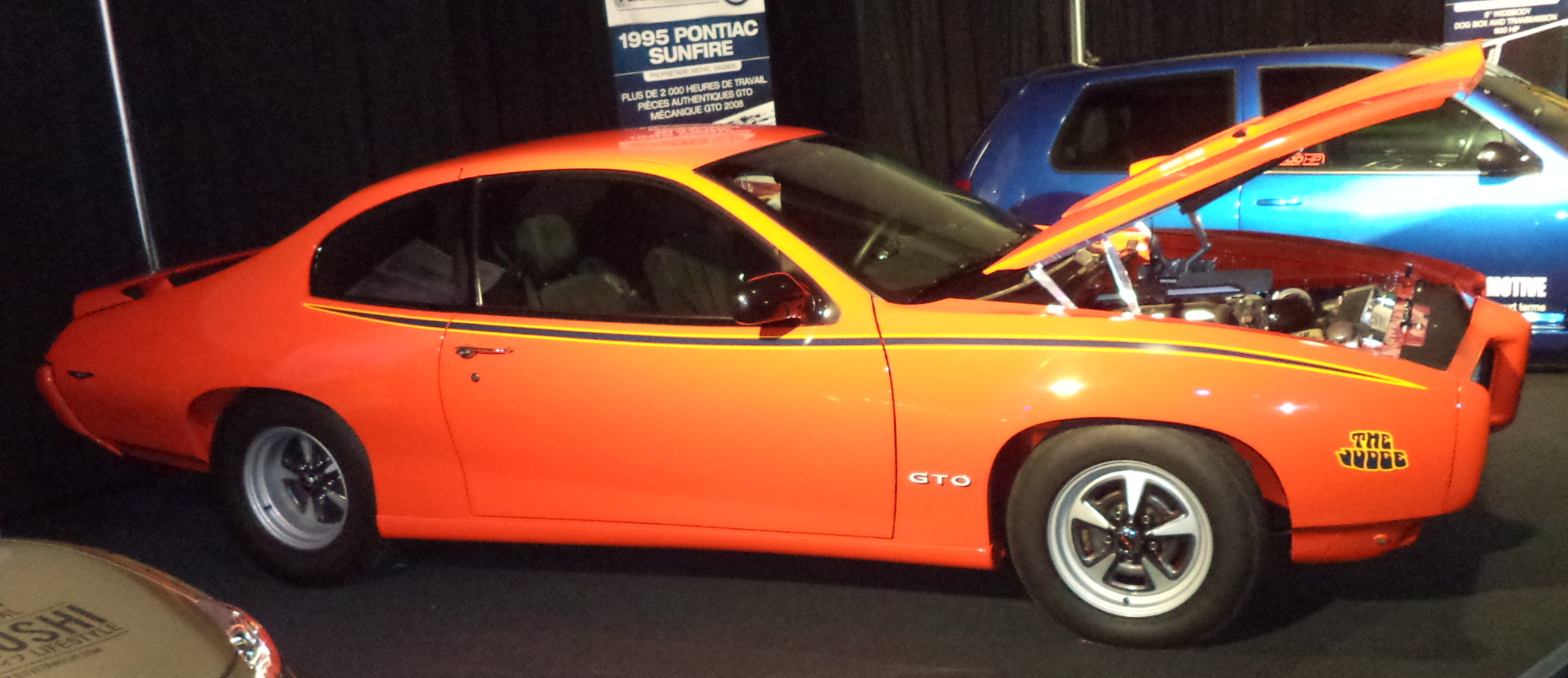
An orange Pontiac Sunfire, like this modified 1995 model, was investigated by campus security before Guimond's disappearance

The theory could be supported by an incident from around the time of the disappearance, when there were two reports of a man driving an orange Pontiac Sunfire on campus, dropping off other men. Before the disappearance, when campus security approached the vehicle, one of the men who were dropped off ran away. After the disappearance, the driver was contacted, but he gave no more information. Before security could investigate the vehicle, it had been destroyed.

Around 2021, the Sheriff's Office sent Guimond's computer to the Minnesota BCA, which started looking through its contents. In 2022, more images of unidentified men were recovered from his hard drive. The Sheriff's Office released 28 of those pictures, asking the public for their help to identify them.

=== Case file lawsuit ===
In December 2021, Brian Guimond sued the Stearns County Sheriff's Office in an attempt to gain access to Joshua's case file. He and his lawyer claimed the Sheriff's Office had not performed a "competent" investigation, and said they should gain access to the file to perform their own investigation. In 2022, he lost the lawsuit and was denied access, after the Sheriff's Office argued such access would jeopardize the investigation, and that it could impede potential prosecution of "anyone who played a role".

== Media depictions ==
The case was originally covered by multiple local news organizations and The New York Times. In 2022, before the case's 20th anniversary, it gained renewed interest due to its coverage in an episode of the Netflix series Unsolved Mysteries, and a podcast on the disappearance, Simply Vanished. The Stearns County Sheriff's Office participated in the making of the Unsolved Mysteries episode, which brought in a wealth of new tips. The episode led to coverage in multiple national news organizations. Simply Vanished was created by a local attorney who felt the case investigators spent too much time focusing on the theory that Guimond was in a lake.

== See also ==
- List of people who disappeared mysteriously (2000–present)

== Works cited ==
- Newton, Michael (2004). The Encyclopedia of Unsolved Crimes, Infobase Publishing. ISBN 9780816069880
