= Dickinson, Minnesota =

Coordinates: 45°6′51″N 93°48′29″W

Dickinson is a ghost town in Wright County, Minnesota, United States.

== Location ==
Dickinson is located at a bend in Minnesota State Highway 55 on the east side of Wright County, between the cities of Rockford and Buffalo.

== History ==
Dickinson was named for the farmer, Amos C. Dickinson, the original owner of the town site. The town had a station of the Soo Line Railroad. Today, little trace remains of the town, though the state has erected a sign indicating where the town was, and the dirt streets of the town are still navigable by car. Building foundations are said to remain but are not visible to the naked eye. The town was entirely abandoned by the end of the 1930s.
