= Union Grove Township, Meeker County, Minnesota =

Union Grove Township, Minnesota
- Township
- Location within the state of Minnesota Union Grove Township, Minnesota (the United States)
- Coordinates: 45°17′N 94°41′W
- Country: United States
- State: Minnesota
- County: Meeker

Area
  - Total: 36.0 sq mi (93.2 km^{2})
  - Land: 35.1 sq mi (91.0 km^{2})
  - Water: 0.85 sq mi (2.2 km^{2})
- Elevation: 1,188 ft (362 m)

Population (2020)
  - Total: 681
  - Density: 18/sq mi (6.9/km^{2})
- Time zone: UTC-6 (Central (CST))
  - Summer (DST): UTC-5 (CDT)
- FIPS code: 27-66226
- GNIS feature ID: 0665840

Union Grove Township is a township in Meeker County, Minnesota, United States. The population was 633 according to the 2010 census. The unincorporated community of Crow River is part of the township.

== History ==
Union Grove Township was settled in 1856 by Lyman Allen, Andrew Hamilton, John Lowell Haywood, and a man named Baker. Allen and Haywood returned to Massachusetts in 1860. Baker died in Union Grove for unknown reasons. Lyman Allen named the town for a grove of woods that surrounded a union church where Lyman was a member. The township was organized on April 18 or 30, 1866. The meeting was held in the home of Thomas Ryckman. These residents also found the necessity to rule that hogs and sheep could not run loose between April 1 and November 1. During and following the Dakota War of 1862, several of the early families left the area and never returned. The small village of Crow River was the only settlement of note in the township, in which the Jacobson Store at Crow River might be a well-known landmark. .

== Geography ==
According to the United States Census Bureau, the township has a total area of 36.0 square miles (93.2 km^{2}), of which 35.2 square miles (91.0 km^{2}) is land and 0.8 square miles (2.1 km^{2}) (2.31%) is water.

Union Grove Township is located in Township 121 North of the Arkansas Base Line and Range 32 West of the 5th Principal Meridian.

== Demographics ==
According to the 2010 census, there were 633 people, 228 households and 186 families residing in the township. The population density was 17.8 per square mile (6.9/km^{2}). There were 301 housing units at an average density of 8.6/sq mi (3.3/km^{2}). The racial makeup of the township was 98.6% White. Hispanic or Latino of any race were 1.4% of the population.

There were 230 households, of which 35.2% had children under the age of 18 living with them, 71.3% were married couples living together, 3.0% had a female householder with no husband present, and 22.6% were non-families. 20.4% of all households were made up of individuals, and 8.7% had someone living alone who was 65 years of age or older. The average household size was 2.72 and the average family size was 3.16.

27.7% of the population were under the age of 18, 8.0% from 18 to 24, 24.8% from 25 to 44, 25.4% from 45 to 64, and 14.1% who were 65 years of age or older. The median age was 40 years. For every 100 females, there were 117.0 males. For every 100 females age 18 and over, there were 112.2 males.

The median household income was $44,732 and the median family income was $52,813. Males had a median income of $30,694 and females $20,893. The per capita income was $21,157. About 2.2% of families and 3.6% of the population were below the poverty line, including 5.6% of those under the age of 18 and none of those 65 and older.
