= Rassat, Minnesota =

Unincorporated community in Minnesota, United States

Rassat
- Unincorporated community
- Location within Minnesota Location within the United States
- Coordinates: 45°09′08″N 93°59′31″W
- Country: United States
- State: Minnesota
- County: Wright
- Township: Chatham Township and Marysville Township
- Elevation: 981 ft (299 m)
- Time zone: UTC-6 (Central (CST))
  - Summer (DST): UTC-5 (CDT)
- ZIP code: 55358, 55313, and 55390
- Area codes: 320 and 763
- GNIS feature ID: 649832

Rassat is an unincorporated community in Wright County, Minnesota, United States. The community is located near the junction of Wright County Roads 8 and 35 (Division Street).

Rassat is located within Chatham Township and Marysville Township. Nearby places include Maple Lake, Buffalo, and Waverly.

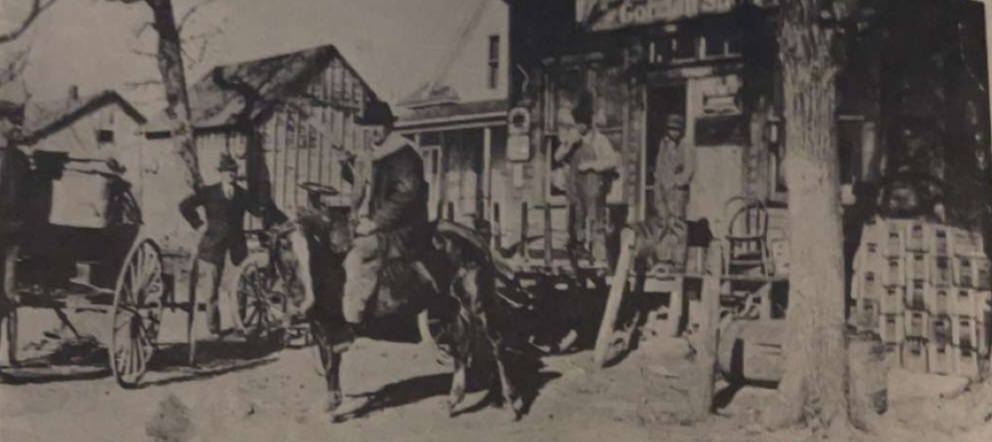
Rassat Street Scene, 1910

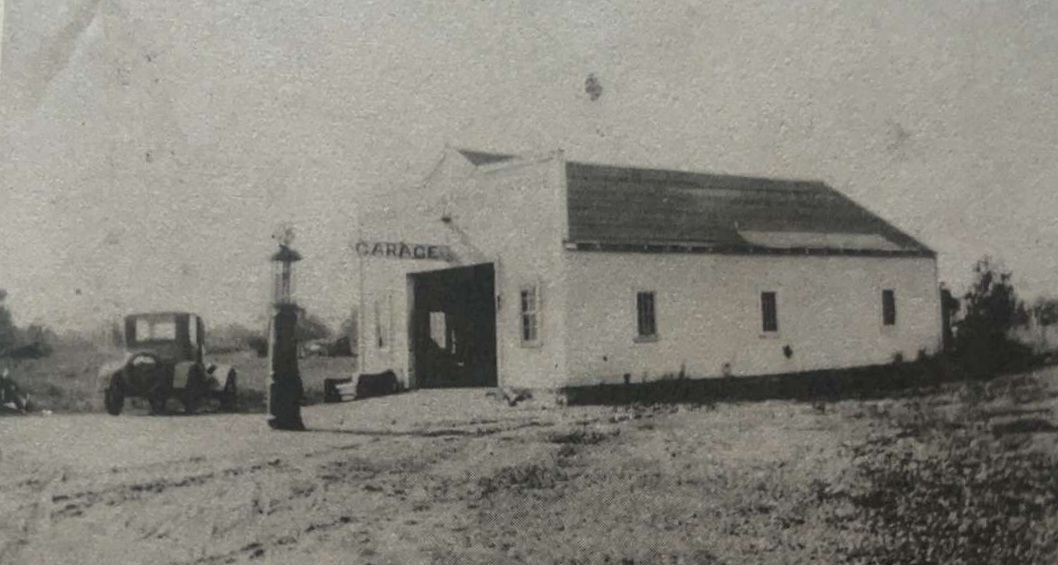
Rassat Garage, 1940s

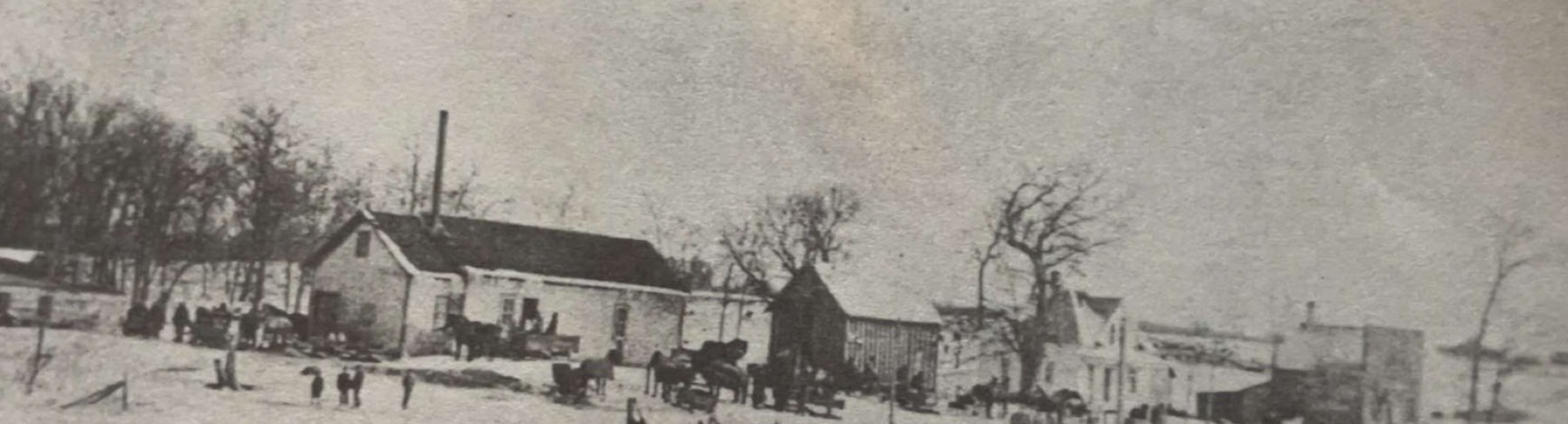
Rassat City Complex, 1910s

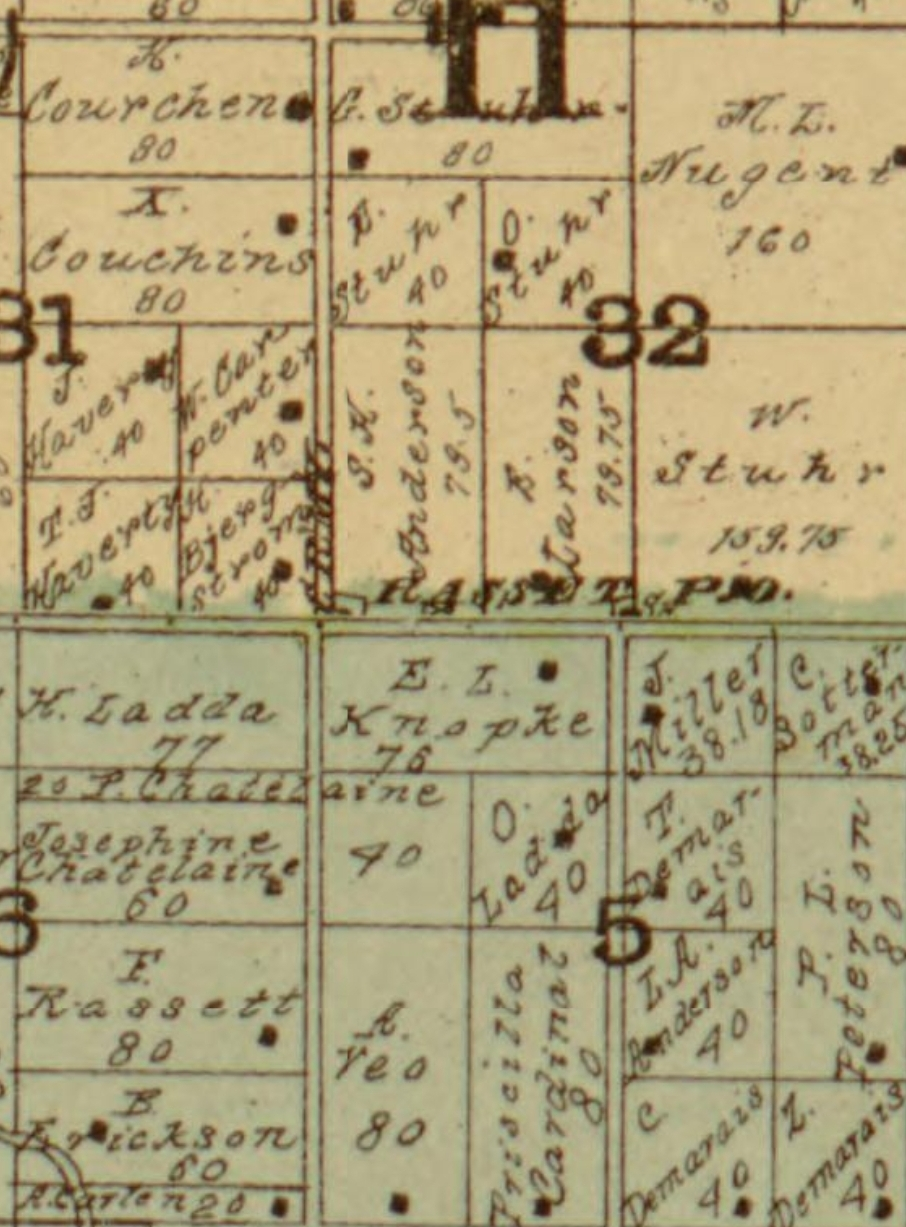
Rassat, Minn. 1900

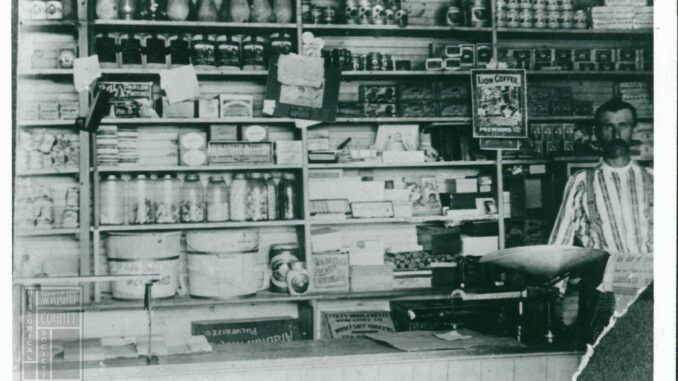
Inside Rassat Store, 1910s
