= Smith Lake (Wright County, Minnesota) =

Lake in the state of Minnesota, United States

- Location within Minnesota
- Location: Wright County, Minnesota
- Coordinates: 45°4′40″N 94°7′31″W
- Type: lake

Smith Lake is a lake in Wright County, in the U.S. state of Minnesota.

Smith Lake was named for Eugene Smith, a pioneer who settled there in 1858.

== See also ==
- List of lakes in Minnesota
