= Clearwater Township, Wright County, Minnesota =

Clearwater Township, Minnesota
- Township
- Location within the state of Minnesota Clearwater Township, Minnesota (the United States)
- Coordinates: 45°22′N 94°2′W
- Country: United States
- State: Minnesota
- County: Wright

Area
  - Total: 23.9 sq mi (61.8 km^{2})
  - Land: 22.4 sq mi (58.1 km^{2})
  - Water: 1.4 sq mi (3.7 km^{2})
- Elevation: 1,030 ft (314 m)

Population (2000)
  - Total: 1,368
  - Density: 61/sq mi (23.6/km^{2})
- Time zone: UTC-6 (Central (CST))
  - Summer (DST): UTC-5 (CDT)
- ZIP code: 55320
- Area code: 320
- FIPS code: 27-11818
- GNIS feature ID: 0663818
- Website: https://clearwatertownship.org/

Clearwater Township is a township in Wright County, Minnesota, United States. The population was 1,368 at the 2000 census.

Clearwater Township was organized in 1858, and named after the Clearwater River.

== Geography ==
According to the United States Census Bureau, the township has a total area of 61.8 km^{2} (23.9 sq mi), of which 58.0 km^{2} (22.4 sq mi) is land and 3.7 km^{2} (1.4 sq mi) (6.04%) is water.

Clearwater Township is located mainly in Township 122 North of the Arkansas Base Line and Range 27 West of the 5th Principal Meridian.

== Demographics ==
As of the census of 2000, there were 1,368 people, 479 households, and 378 families residing in the township. The population density was 23.6/km^{2} (61/sq mi). There were 568 housing units at an average density of 9.8/km^{2} (25/sq mi). The racial makeup of the township was 98.17% White, 0.44% African American, 0.37% Native American, 0.22% Asian, 0.07% Pacific Islander, 0.15% from other races, and 0.58% from two or more races. Hispanic or Latino of any race were 0.44% of the population.

There were 479 households, out of which 38.2% had children under the age of 18 living with them, 71.4% were married couples living together, 4.8% had a female householder with no husband present, and 20.9% were non-families. 14.0% of all households were made up of individuals, and 4.4% had someone living alone who was 65 years of age or older. The average household size was 2.86 and the average family size was 3.18.

In the township the population was spread out, with 29.2% under the age of 18, 6.5% from 18 to 24, 32.3% from 25 to 44, 23.1% from 45 to 64, and 8.8% who were 65 years of age or older. The median age was 36 years. For every 100 females, there were 105.4 males. For every 100 females age 18 and over, there were 109.1 males.

The median income for a household in the township was $54,688, and the median income for a family was $60,000. Males had a median income of $40,927 versus $28,333 for females. The per capita income for the township was $22,220. About 3.4% of families and 5.1% of the population were below the poverty line, including 7.0% of those under age 18 and 3.1% of those age 65 or over.
