= Crow River, Minnesota =

- Unincorporated community
- Location within Minnesota Location within the United States
- Coordinates: 45°14′38″N 94°43′28″W
- Country: United States
- State: Minnesota
- County: Meeker
- Township: Union Grove
- Elevation: 1,158 ft (353 m)
- Time zone: UTC-6 (Central (CST))
  - Summer (DST): UTC-5 (CDT)
- ZIP code: 56243
- Area code: 320
- GNIS feature ID: 654657

Crow River is an unincorporated community in Union Grove Township, Meeker County, Minnesota, United States, near Grove City. The community is located along 520th Avenue near 343rd Street. Meeker County Roads 3 and 25 are also in the immediate area. The Middle Fork of the Crow River flows nearby.

At one time, Crow River included a post office, blacksmith, creamery, feed mill, garage, and the Crow River Store which was in operation from 1902 to 1965.
