= Lake Maria State Park =

State park in Minnesota, United States

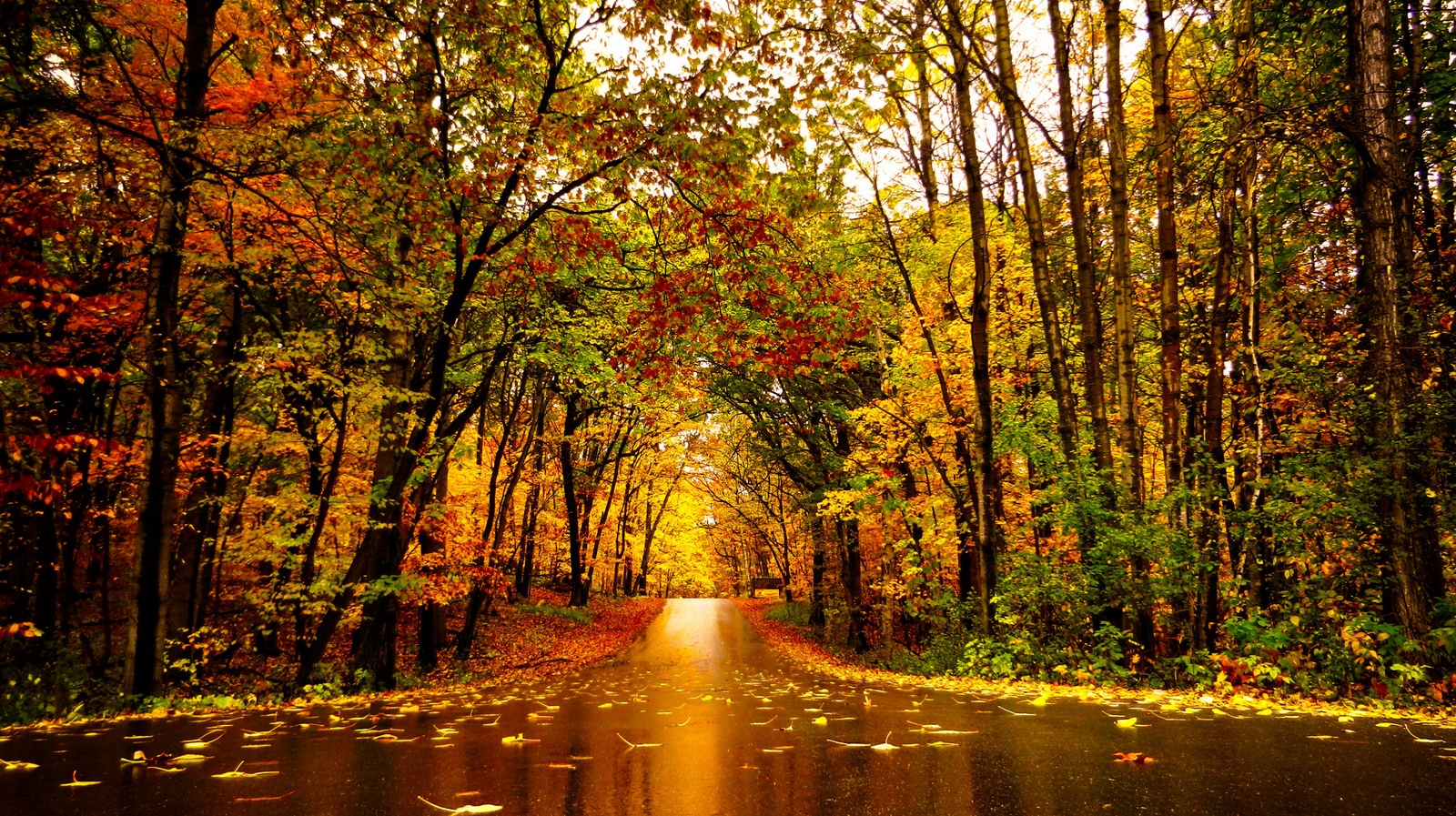
- Lake Maria State Park in autumn

- Location within Minnesota Location within the United States
- Location: Wright County, Minnesota, United States
- Coordinates: 45°18′49″N 93°57′25″W
- Area: 1,475 acres (5.97 km^{2})
- Elevation: 981 ft (299 m)
- Established: 1963
- Governing body: Minnesota Department of Natural Resources

Lake Maria State Park (/məˈraɪə/ mə-RY-ə) is a state park of Minnesota, United States, created to provide a wilderness area within an easy drive of Minneapolis–Saint Paul. The park's amenities are designed primarily for hikers, backpackers, and horseback riders and consequently use remains light compared to other state parks around the metro area. It preserves a remnant of Big Woods atop a hilly, glacially-formed landscape dotted with lakes and wetlands. The park was established in 1963 west of the city of Monticello.

== Natural history ==
The St. Croix Moraine runs through the park. This rolling and uneven landform is a result of the Wisconsin glaciation and two previous glaciations. Irregular hills and ridges (kames) surround kettles, depressions left by melting blocks of ice during the glaciers' retreat.

== Flora and fauna ==
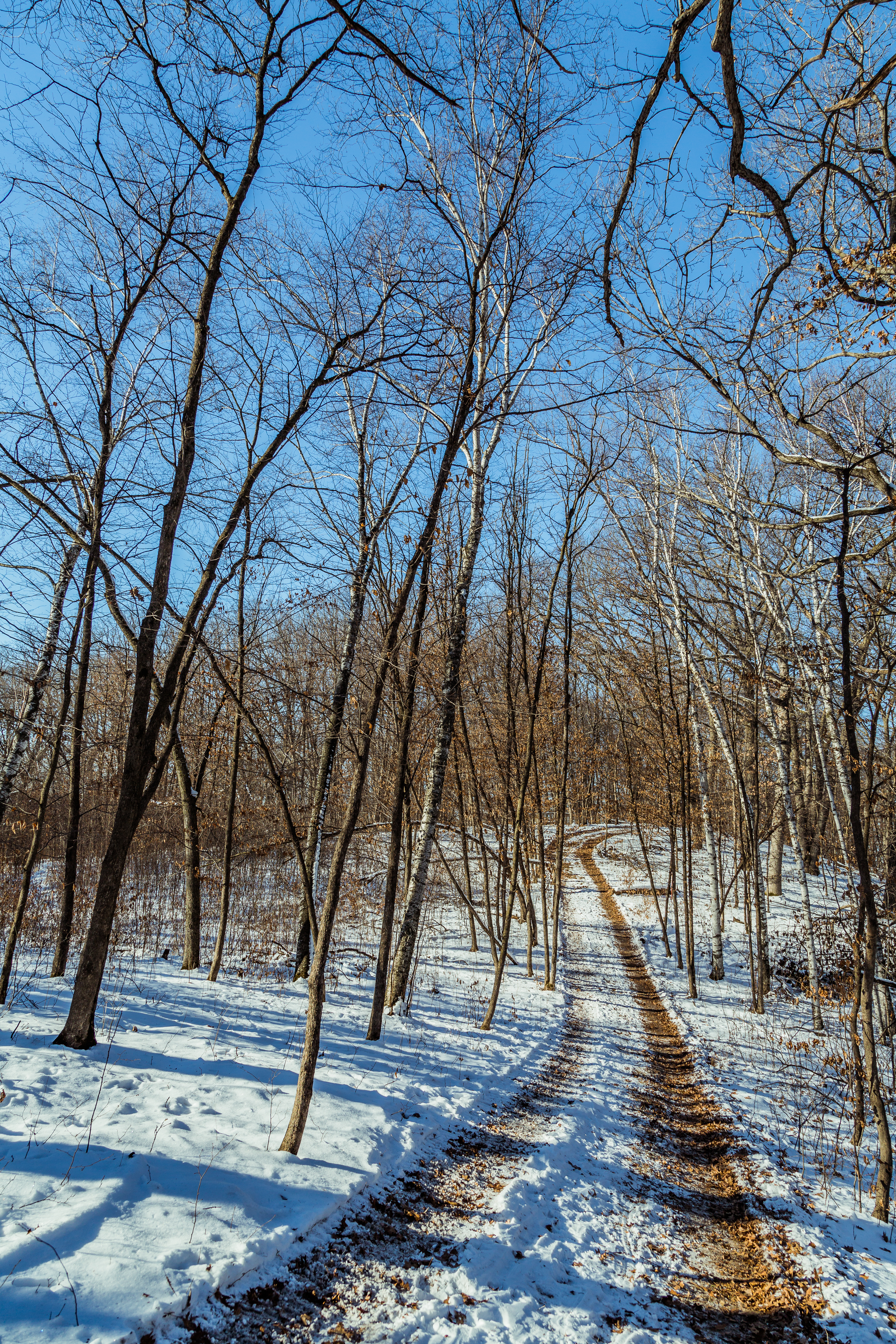
Lake Maria State Park in winter

The park's vegetation consists of Big Woods (maple, basswood, elm) mixed with old-growth oaks and dotted with numerous wetlands, ponds, and small lakes. The park is located near the northern limit of the Big Woods.

The forest edge and wetland habitats support mammalian species including white-tailed deer, red fox, fisher, mole, gopher, mink, beaver, woodchuck, and muskrat. 205 bird species have been identified in the park. The park is noted for its population of Blanding's turtles, considered an endangered or threatened species by many U.S. states and Canada.

== Cultural history ==
The park was first proposed in 1947 in a deal in which the U.S. Forest Service would acquire the land and trade it to the state for state-owned land within Superior National Forest. The deal fell through because the USFS would not use eminent domain to buy the land from the various current owners. Lake Maria State Park was re-authorized in a 1963 bill that authorized fourteen state parks. Land acquisition through eminent domain began and the park officially opened in 1971. The concept for the park emphasized conservation over recreation, and so hike-in campsites were made in lieu of a drive-in campground. The park was expanded to the north and west in 1980 to include the whole shoreline of Maria Lake. Incidentally the lake originally called Maria Lake was renamed Bjorkland Lake by the DNR, and "Maria Lake" became an arm of Silver Lake, which lies mostly outside the park's western boundary.

== Recreation ==
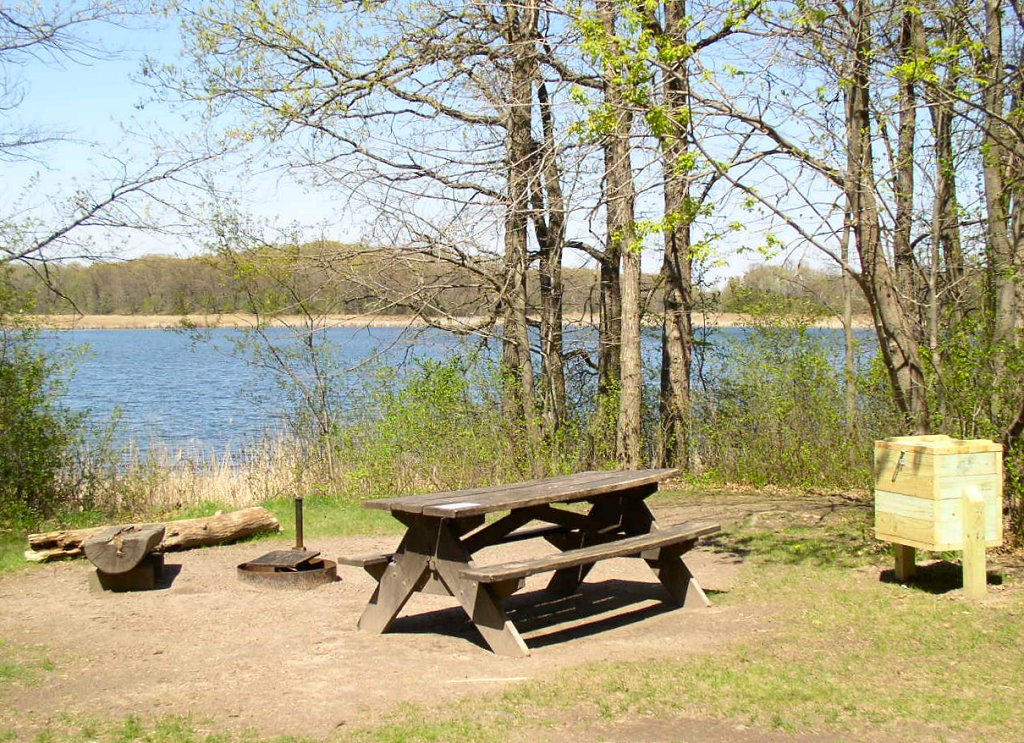
A walk-in campsite overlooking Bjorkland Lake

Lake Maria State Park does not have a traditional drive-in campground. Instead 17 backpacking sites and three camper cabins are scattered throughout the park, only accessible by a hike of .5 to 1 mile (0.80 to 1.61 km). Two primitive group camps are accessible by road, each accommodating groups of up to 50 people. A picnic area along the shore of Lake Maria features fire rings, grills, and drinking water.

Maria Lake has a public boat ramp and some rental canoes. Only outboard motors under 20 hp (15 kW) are allowed on the lake. Bjorkland Lake has a canoe launch but watercraft must be portaged in. There is a fishing pier on Maria Lake near the picnic area. Game fish in Maria and Bjorkland include crappie, bass, bluegill, northern pike, bullhead, and perch.

The park has 14 miles (23 km) of trails, 6 miles (9.7 km) of which are open to horseback riding. The 1-mile (1.6 km) Zumbrunnen and Forest Shadow Trails each boast interpretive signage. The park's trail center features interpretive displays, modern restrooms, and indoor picnic tables. It is open all year, serving as a warming hut in the winter.

Lake Maria State Park accommodates a variety of winter activities. 14 miles (23 km) of trail are groomed for cross-country skiing. 2 miles (3.2 km) are groomed specifically for skate skiing. 3 miles (4.8 km) of trail are packed for hiking or snowshoeing, and snowshoers can roam anywhere in the park provided they stay off the groomed ski trails. A pond near the trail center serves as an ice rink with outdoor lighting.
