= Chatham Township, Wright County, Minnesota =

Chatham Township, Minnesota
- Township
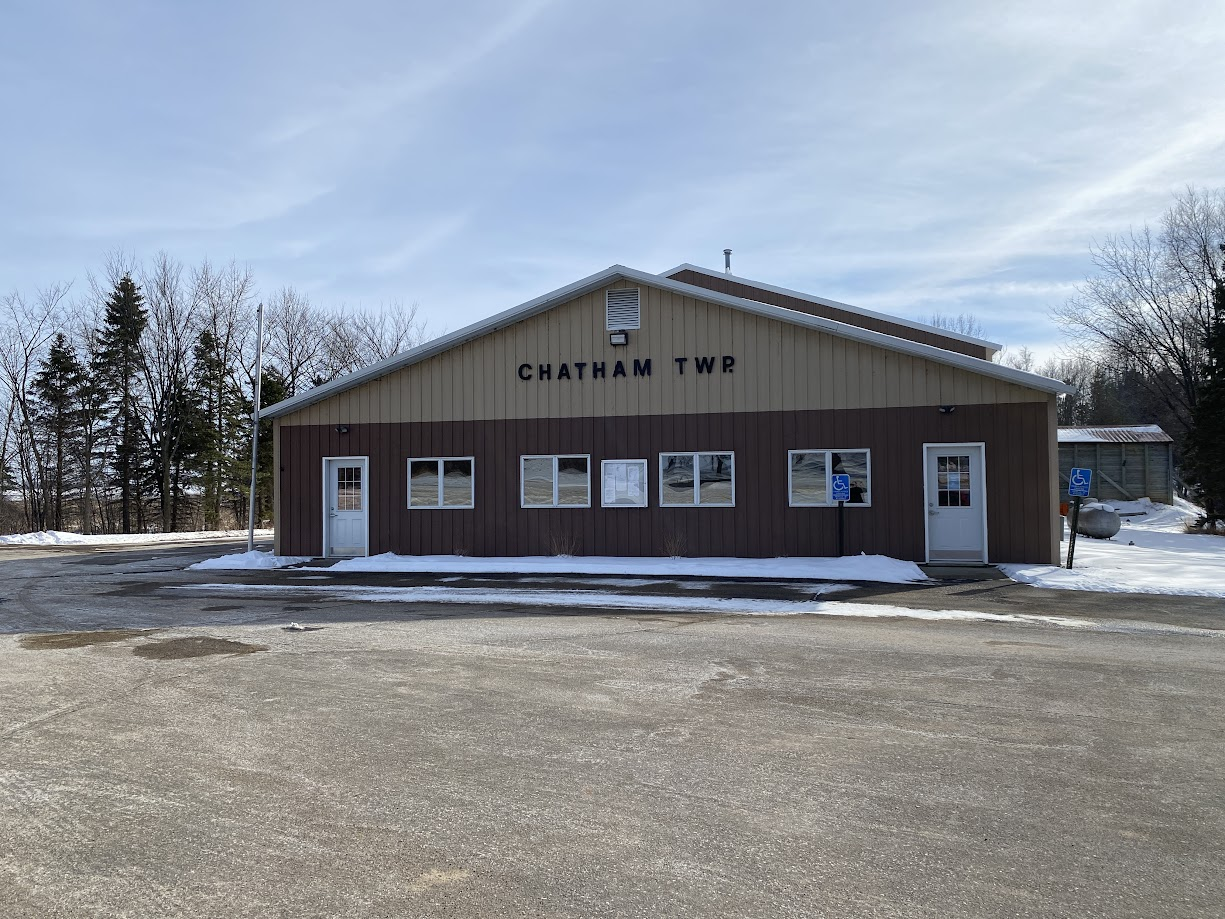
- Town Hall of Chatham

- Location within the state of Minnesota Chatham Township, Minnesota (the United States)
- Coordinates: 45°10′31″N 93°56′28″W
- Country: United States
- State: Minnesota
- County: Wright

Area
  - Total: 17.3 sq mi (44.9 km^{2})
  - Land: 15.1 sq mi (39.1 km^{2})
  - Water: 2.3 sq mi (5.9 km^{2})
- Elevation: 991 ft (302 m)

Population (2000)
  - Total: 1,162
  - Density: 77/sq mi (29.7/km^{2})
- Time zone: UTC-6 (Central (CST))
  - Summer (DST): UTC-5 (CDT)
- FIPS code: 27-11062
- GNIS feature ID: 0663788
- Website: https://sites.google.com/view/chatham-township-mn

Chatham Township is a township in Wright County, Minnesota, United States. The population was 1,162 at the 2000 census.

Chatham Township was organized in 1868, and named for William Pitt, 1st Earl of Chatham.

== Geography ==
According to the United States Census Bureau, the township has a total area of 17.4 square miles (45 km^{2}), of which 15.1 square miles (39 km^{2}) is land and 2.3 square miles (6.0 km^{2}) (13.08%) is water.

== Demographics ==
As of the census of 2000, there were 1,162 people, 374 households, and 314 families residing in the township. The population density was 77.0 inhabitants per square mile (29.7/km^{2}). There were 384 housing units at an average density of 25.5 per square mile (9.8/km^{2}). The racial makeup of the township was 98.80% White, 0.09% African American, 0.34% Native American, 0.34% Asian, and 0.43% from two or more races. Hispanic or Latino of any race were 0.69% of the population.

There were 374 households, out of which 44.4% had children under the age of 18 living with them, 77.3% were married couples living together, 3.2% had a female householder with no husband present, and 16.0% were non-families. 11.8% of all households were made up of individuals, and 5.1% had someone living alone who was 65 years of age or older. The average household size was 3.11 and the average family size was 3.40.

In the township the population was spread out, with 32.6% under the age of 18, 6.5% from 18 to 24, 29.5% from 25 to 44, 24.6% from 45 to 64, and 6.8% who were 65 years of age or older. The median age was 36 years. For every 100 females, there were 101.4 males. For every 100 females age 18 and over, there were 107.7 males.

The median income for a household in the township was $71,250, and the median income for a family was $74,667. Males had a median income of $43,438 versus $28,000 for females. The per capita income for the township was $24,080. About 1.4% of families and 3.1% of the population were below the poverty line, including 2.9% of those under age 18 and 5.6% of those age 65 or over.

== See also ==
- List of townships in Minnesota
