= Silver Creek Township, Wright County, Minnesota =

Silver Creek Township, Minnesota
- Township
- Location within the state of Minnesota Silver Creek Township, Minnesota (the United States)
- Coordinates: 45°19′56″N 93°58′1″W
- Country: United States
- State: Minnesota
- County: Wright

Area
  - Total: 39.2 sq mi (101.5 km^{2})
  - Land: 36.0 sq mi (93.3 km^{2})
  - Water: 3.2 sq mi (8.2 km^{2})
- Elevation: 974 ft (297 m)

Population (2000)
  - Total: 2,332
  - Density: 65/sq mi (25/km^{2})
- Time zone: UTC-6 (Central (CST))
  - Summer (DST): UTC-5 (CDT)
- ZIP code: 55380
- Area code: 763
- FIPS code: 27-60340
- GNIS feature ID: 0665614
- Website: https://silvercreektwp.com/

Silver Creek Township is a township in Wright County, Minnesota, United States. The population was 2,332 at the 2000 census. It contains the census-designated place of Silver Creek.

== History ==
Silver Creek Township was organized in 1858.

== Geography ==
According to the United States Census Bureau, the township has a total area of 39.2 square miles (101.5 km^{2}), of which 36.0 square miles (93.3 km^{2}) is land and 3.2 square miles (8.2 km^{2}) (8.11%) is water.

== Demographics ==
As of the census of 2000, there were 2,332 people, 789 households, and 658 families residing in the township. The population density was 64.8 inhabitants per square mile (25.0/km^{2}). There were 897 housing units at an average density of 24.9/sq mi (9.6/km^{2}). The racial makeup of the township was 99.01% White, 0.17% Native American, 0.30% Asian, 0.04% from other races, and 0.47% from two or more races. Hispanic or Latino of any race were 0.13% of the population.

There were 789 households, out of which 41.4% had children under the age of 18 living with them, 76.2% were married couples living together, 4.3% had a female householder with no husband present, and 16.6% were non-families. 13.8% of all households were made up of individuals, and 4.3% had someone living alone who was 65 years of age or older. The average household size was 2.96 and the average family size was 3.25.

In the township the population was spread out, with 30.4% under the age of 18, 6.4% from 18 to 24, 30.7% from 25 to 44, 25.6% from 45 to 64, and 6.9% who were 65 years of age or older. The median age was 36 years. For every 100 females, there were 104.6 males. For every 100 females age 18 and over, there were 103.1 males.

The median income for a household in the township was $60,511, and the median income for a family was $64,500. Males had a median income of $41,613 versus $28,966 for females. The per capita income for the township was $23,430. About 2.8% of families and 3.7% of the population were below the poverty line, including 3.0% of those under age 18 and 6.1% of those age 65 or over.
