= Middleville Township, Wright County, Minnesota =

Middleville Township, Minnesota
- Township
- Location within the state of Minnesota Middleville Township, Minnesota (the United States)
- Coordinates: 45°6′N 94°5′W
- Country: United States
- State: Minnesota
- County: Wright

Area
  - Total: 35.6 sq mi (92.1 km^{2})
  - Land: 33.6 sq mi (87.1 km^{2})
  - Water: 1.9 sq mi (5.0 km^{2})
- Elevation: 1,024 ft (312 m)

Population (2000)
  - Total: 925
  - Density: 27/sq mi (10.6/km^{2})
- Time zone: UTC-6 (Central (CST))
  - Summer (DST): UTC-5 (CDT)
- FIPS code: 27-41966
- GNIS feature ID: 0664966
- Website: www.middlevilletwp.org

Middleville Township is a township in Wright County, Minnesota, United States. The population was 925 at the 2000 census.

Middleville Township was organized in 1858, and named after a place in Virginia.

== Geography ==
According to the United States Census Bureau, the township has a total area of 35.5 square miles (92.0 km^{2}), of which 33.6 square miles (87.1 km^{2}) is land and 1.9 square miles (4.9 km^{2}) (5.37%) is water.

Middleville Township is located in Township 119 North of the Arkansas Base Line and Range 27 West of the 5th Principal Meridian.

== Demographics ==
As of the census of 2000, there were 925 people, 312 households, and 258 families residing in the township. The population density was 27.5 inhabitants per square mile (10.6/km^{2}). There were 327 housing units at an average density of 9.7 per square mile (3.7/km^{2}). The racial makeup of the township was 96.22% White, 0.65% African American, 0.86% Native American, 0.43% Asian, 0.97% from other races, and 0.86% from two or more races. Hispanic or Latino of any race were 1.51% of the population.

There were 312 households, out of which 37.8% had children under the age of 18 living with them, 73.7% were married couples living together, 3.8% had a female householder with no husband present, and 17.3% were non-families. 13.8% of all households were made up of individuals, and 7.1% had someone living alone who was 65 years of age or older. The average household size was 2.96 and the average family size was 3.27.

In the township the population was spread out, with 30.9% under the age of 18, 6.6% from 18 to 24, 26.5% from 25 to 44, 23.6% from 45 to 64, and 12.4% who were 65 years of age or older. The median age was 37 years. For every 100 females, there were 107.9 males. For every 100 females age 18 and over, there were 109.5 males.

The median income for a household in the township was $50,833, and the median income for a family was $52,159. Males had a median income of $40,556 versus $24,844 for females. The per capita income for the township was $18,850. About 0.8% of families and 2.2% of the population were below the poverty line, including 1.8% of those under age 18 and 6.6% of those age 65 or over.
