= Maple Lake, Minnesota =

City in Minnesota, United States

Maple Lake
- City
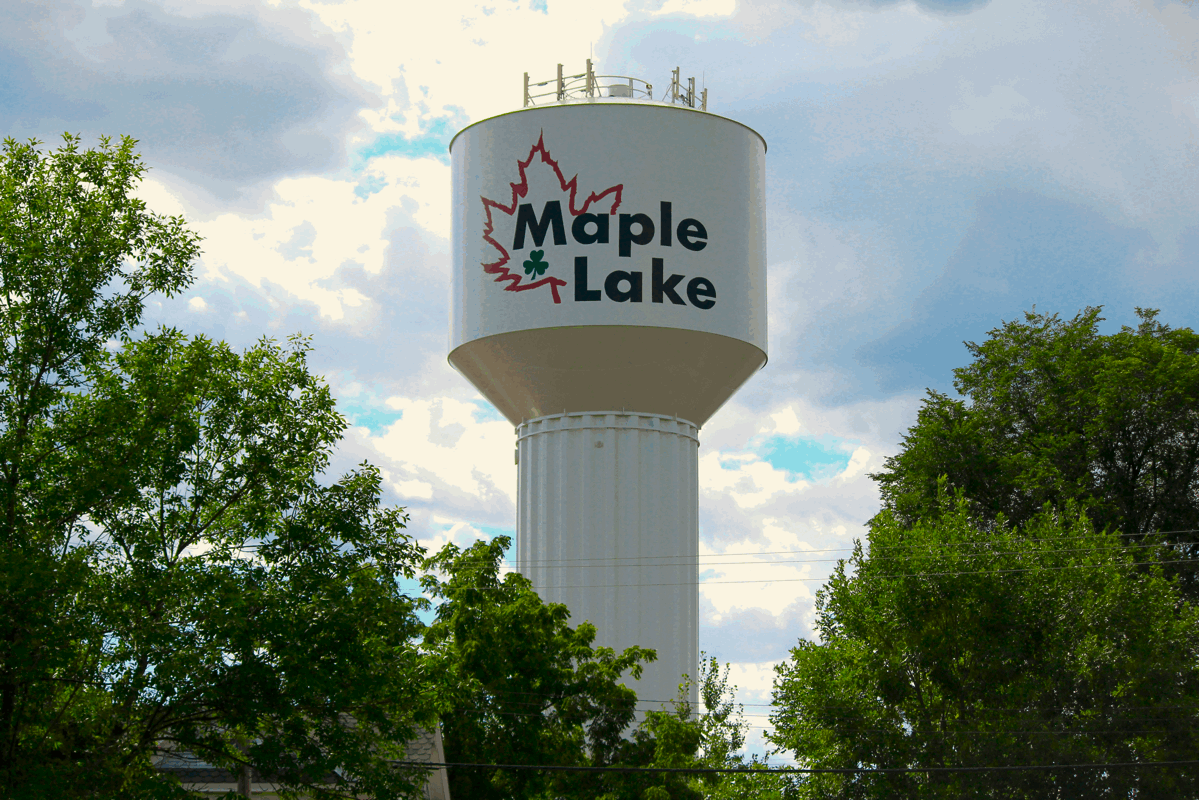
- Maple Lake, Minnesota water tower
- Motto: "A Proud Past And A Bright Future"
- Location of Maple Lake within Wright County, Minnesota
- Coordinates: 45°13′48″N 94°0′4″W
- Country: United States
- State: Minnesota
- County: Wright

Area
  - Total: 2.23 sq mi (5.78 km^{2})
  - Land: 2.21 sq mi (5.72 km^{2})
  - Water: 0.023 sq mi (0.06 km^{2})
- Elevation: 1,053 ft (321 m)

Population (2020)
  - Total: 2,159
  - Density: 978/sq mi (377.6/km^{2})
- Time zone: UTC-6 (Central (CST))
  - Summer (DST): UTC-5 (CDT)
- ZIP code: 55358
- Area code: 320
- FIPS code: 27-40220
- GNIS feature ID: 0647487
- Website: www.ci.maple-lake.mn.us

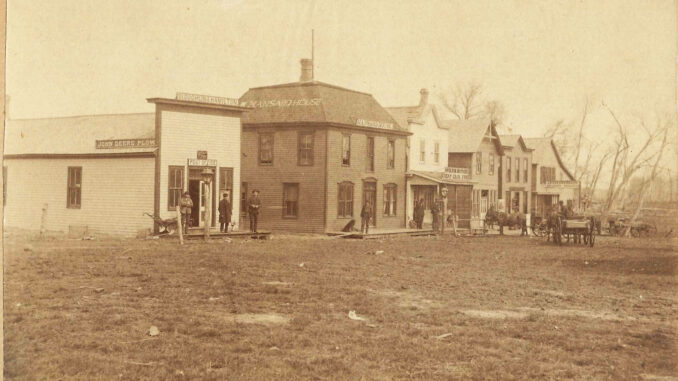
Maple Ave. 1889. (Kobe Mendelson)

Maple Lake is a city in Wright County, Minnesota, United States. The population was 2,159 at the 2020 census. Minnesota State Highway 55 serves as a main route in the city.

== History ==
The area where Maple Lake now stands was long a quiet expanse of forest and water home to the Dakota and Ojibwe peoples. They hunted game in the woods and fished in the lake that later gave the town its name.

In the early 1800s, as the United States expanded westward, explorers like Zebulon Pike passed through the region, laying claim to vast territories. By the mid-1850s, the U.S. government had opened Wright County to settlers and the first pioneers arrived, drawn by the promise of fertile soil and abundant timber. Among them were Irish immigrants, many from County Clare.

One of the earliest settlers was Patrick O'Loughlin Sr., who arrived with his family and laid the foundation for what became Maple Lake. His son-in-law James Madigan Madigan platted the village in 1886, carving out streets and lots from the wilderness. The name "Maple Lake" was chosen not just for the body of water nearby, but for the township in which it sat—a nod to the towering maple trees that color the landscape each autumn.

Maple Lake grew from a scattering of homesteads into a bustling village. A post office was established in 1858, churches were built, schools opened, and businesses sprang up along the main street. The town became a hub for farmers and tradesmen.

The Irish influence remained strong. Families such as the O'Loughlins, Madigans, and Murphys became pillars of the community.

In 1946, James R. Jude, a thoracic surgeon who later helped develop CPR, compiled a scrapbook of photographs of life in Maple Lake. They are preserved in the Maple Lake Library Archives, alongside thousands of obituaries, marriage announcements, and newspaper clippings.

== Geography ==
According to the United States Census Bureau, the city has an area of 2.26 square miles (5.85 km^{2}); 2.23 square miles (5.78 km^{2}) is land and 0.03 square miles (0.08 km^{2}) is water.

== Demographics ==
Historical population
Census	Pop.	Note	%±
1900	470		—
1910	522		11.1%
1920	677		29.7%
1930	660		−2.5%
1940	637		−3.5%
1950	780		22.4%
1960	1,018		30.5%
1970	1,124		10.4%
1980	1,132		0.7%
1990	1,394		23.1%
2000	1,633		17.1%
2010	2,059		26.1%
2020	2,159		4.9%
U.S. Decennial Census

=== 2020 census ===
As of the 2020 census, Maple Lake had a population of 2,159. The median age was 36.5 years. 25.7% of residents were under the age of 18 and 12.5% of residents were 65 years of age or older. For every 100 females there were 99.4 males, and for every 100 females age 18 and over there were 96.2 males age 18 and over.

0.0% of residents lived in urban areas, while 100.0% lived in rural areas.

There were 826 households in Maple Lake, of which 31.6% had children under the age of 18 living in them. Of all households, 51.9% were married-couple households, 17.2% were households with a male householder and no spouse or partner present, and 21.4% were households with a female householder and no spouse or partner present. About 28.4% of all households were made up of individuals and 11.5% had someone living alone who was 65 years of age or older.

There were 856 housing units, of which 3.5% were vacant. The homeowner vacancy rate was 0.5% and the rental vacancy rate was 6.0%.

Racial composition as of the 2020 census
Race	Number	Percent
White	2,037	94.3%
Black or African American	11	0.5%
American Indian and Alaska Native	1	0.0%
Asian	8	0.4%
Native Hawaiian and Other Pacific Islander	0	0.0%
Some other race	13	0.6%
Two or more races	89	4.1%
Hispanic or Latino (of any race)	46	2.1%

=== 2010 census ===
As of the census of 2010, there were 2,059 people, 773 households, and 528 families living in the city. The population density was 923.3 inhabitants per square mile (356.5/km^{2}). There were 822 housing units at an average density of 368.6 per square mile (142.3/km^{2}). The racial makeup of the city was 97.2% White, 0.7% African American, 0.2% Native American, 0.3% Asian, 0.2% from other races, and 1.4% from two or more races. Hispanic or Latino of any race were 0.9% of the population.

There were 773 households, of which 41.0% had children under the age of 18 living with them, 52.8% were married couples living together, 10.3% had a female householder with no husband present, 5.2% had a male householder with no wife present, and 31.7% were non-families. 27.0% of all households were made up of individuals, and 9.9% had someone living alone who was 65 years of age or older. The average household size was 2.63 and the average family size was 3.22.

The median age in the city was 32.3 years. 31% of residents were under the age of 18; 7.3% were between the ages of 18 and 24; 29.9% were from 25 to 44; 22.4% were from 45 to 64; and 9.3% were 65 years of age or older. The gender makeup of the city was 48.7% male and 51.3% female.

=== 2000 census ===
As of the census of 2000, there were 1,633 people, 621 households, and 388 families living in the city. The population density was 848.9 inhabitants per square mile (327.8/km^{2}). There were 632 housing units at an average density of 328.6 per square mile (126.9/km^{2}). The racial makeup of the city was 99.02% White, 0.24% African American, 0.06% Native American, 0.18% Asian, 0.24% from other races, and 0.24% from two or more races. Hispanic or Latino of any race were 0.98% of the population. 52.4% were of German, 8.6% Irish and 7.4% Norwegian ancestry according to Census 2000.

There were 621 households, of which 35.6% had children under 18 living with them, 51.9% were married couples living together, 6.3% had a female householder with no husband present, and 37.5% were non-families. 30.4% of all households were made up of individuals, and 15.8% had someone living alone who was 65 or older. The average household size was 2.62 and the average family size was 3.38.

In the city, the population was spread out, with 30.3% under the age of 18, 9.9% from 18 to 24, 31.8% from 25 to 44, 14.5% from 45 to 64, and 13.5% who were 65 or older. The median age was 32. For every 100 females, there were 98.9 males. For every 100 females 18 and older, there were 98.8 males.

The median household income was $43,047.50, and the median family income was $54,423. Men had a median income of $35,375 versus $25,250 for women. The per capita income was $17,476. About 2.3% of families and 5.5% of the population were below the poverty line, including 4.3% of those under 18 and 15.6% of those 65 or older.

== Notable people ==
- William Henry Bullock (1927–2011), bishop of the Roman Catholic Diocese of Madison, Wisconsin. Born in Maple Lake.
- Joshua Guimond (born 1982), a college student who disappeared in 2002. Grew up in Maple Lake.
- Arnold D. Gruys (1928–2020), a member of the Minnesota House of Representatives. Born in Maple Lake.
- James Jude (1928–2015), surgeon known for the development of the external cardiac massage, a component of CPR. Born in Maple Lake.
- Marion O'Neill (born 1969), Minnesota state representatives for District 29B. Lives in Maple Lake
