= Wright County, Minnesota =

County in Minnesota, United States

- County
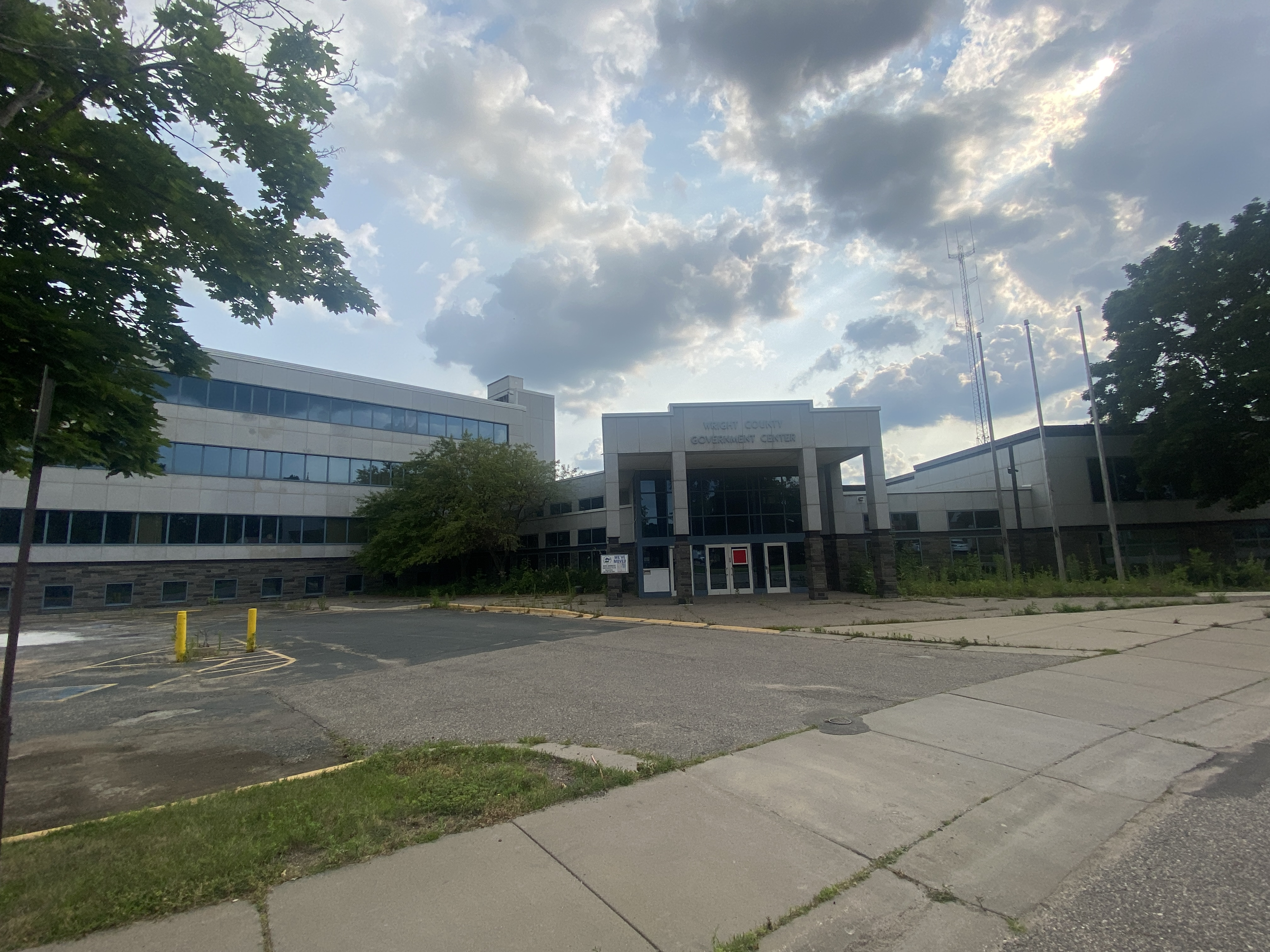
- Wright County Government Center, Buffalo, MN (2024)

- Location within the U.S. state of Minnesota
- Coordinates: 45°11′N 93°58′W
- Country: United States
- State: Minnesota
- Founded: February 20, 1855
- Named for: Silas Wright
- Seat: Buffalo
- Largest city: Otsego

Area
  - Total: 714 sq mi (1,850 km^{2})
  - Land: 661 sq mi (1,710 km^{2})
  - Water: 53 sq mi (140 km^{2}) 7.4%

Population (2020)
  - Total: 141,337
  - Estimate (2025): 157,559 ▲
  - Density: 238.4/sq mi (92.0/km^{2})
- Time zone: UTC−6 (Central)
  - Summer (DST): UTC−5 (CDT)
- Congressional district: 6th
- Website: www.wrightcountymn.gov

Wright County is a county in the East Central part of the U.S. state of Minnesota. The population was 141,337 at the 2020 census, then growing to an estimated 157,557 in 2025. Its county seat is Buffalo. The county was founded in 1855. Wright County is part of the Minneapolis-St. Paul-Bloomington, MN-WI Metropolitan Statistical Area. In terms of population, Wright County is the tenth-largest county in Minnesota and the fastest growing.

== History ==
The county was established in 1855, and was named for New York politician Silas Wright. The first county seat was Monticello; in 1868 the county seat was changed to Buffalo. Most of the area's first settlers were of German and Swedish origin. The county's population in 1860 was 3,729; in 1875, it was 13,775.

The 1998 thriller A Simple Plan was set in Wright County, though it does not mention a specific town.

== Geography ==
Soils of Wright County

According to the United States Census Bureau, the county has an area of 714 square miles (1,850 km^{2}), of which 661 square miles (1,710 km^{2}) is land and 53 square miles (140 km^{2}) (7.4%) is water. The terrain is undulating and contains numerous small lakes. The county is bounded on the northeast by the Mississippi River. Wright is one of 17 Minnesota savanna region counties with more savanna soils than either prairie or forest soils, and one of only two Minnesota counties where savanna soils make up more than 75% of the county area (the other is the adjacent Hennepin County).

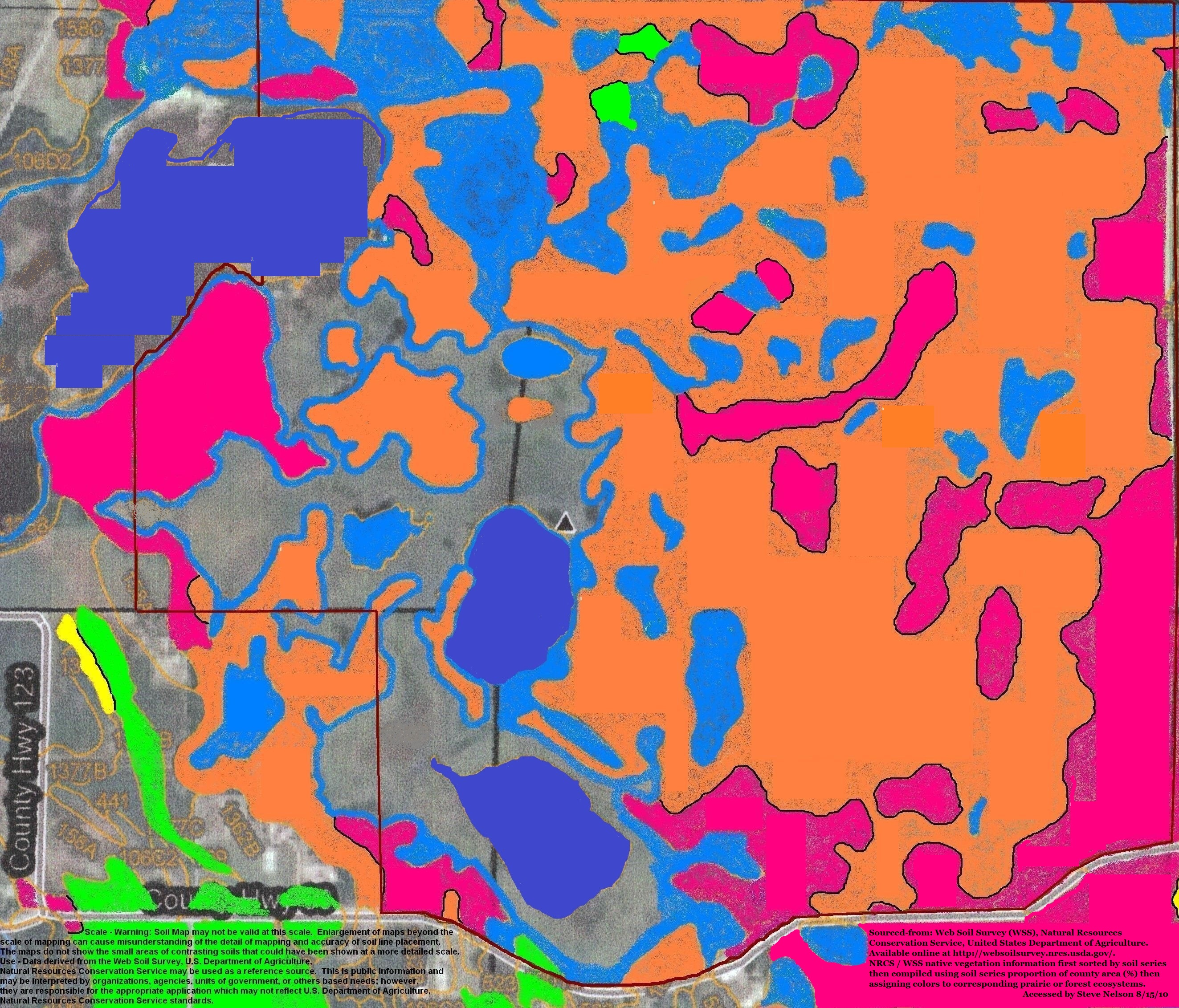
Soils of Lake Maria State Park

=== Major highways ===
- Interstate 94
- U.S. Highway 12
- U.S. Highway 52 (runs hidden with I-94)
- Minnesota State Highway 24
- Minnesota State Highway 25
- Minnesota State Highway 55
- Minnesota State Highway 101
- Minnesota State Highway 241

=== Adjacent counties ===
- Sherburne County - northeast
- Hennepin County - east
- Carver County - southeast
- McLeod County - southwest
- Meeker County - west
- Stearns County - northwest

== Demographics ==
Historical population
Census	Pop.	Note	%±
1860	3,729		—
1870	9,457		153.6%
1880	18,104		91.4%
1890	24,164		33.5%
1900	29,157		20.7%
1910	28,082		−3.7%
1920	28,685		2.1%
1930	27,119		−5.5%
1940	27,550		1.6%
1950	27,716		0.6%
1960	29,935		8.0%
1970	38,933		30.1%
1980	58,681		50.7%
1990	68,710		17.1%
2000	89,986		31.0%
2010	124,700		38.6%
2020	141,337		13.3%
2025 (est.)	157,557	▲	11.5%
U.S. Decennial Census; 1790–1960 1900–1990; 1990–2000

=== 2020 census ===
As of the 2020 United States census, the county had a population of 141,337. The median age was 37.4 years. 28.3% of residents were under the age of 18 and 13.3% of residents were 65 years of age or older. For every 100 females there were 101.4 males, and for every 100 females age 18 and over there were 99.5 males age 18 and over.

The racial makeup of the county was 89.9% White, 1.9% Black or African American, 0.3% American Indian and Alaska Native, 1.3% Asian, <0.1% Native Hawaiian and Pacific Islander, 1.6% from some other race, and 5.0% from two or more races. Hispanic or Latino residents of any race comprised 3.3% of the population.

60.8% of residents lived in urban areas, while 39.2% lived in rural areas.

There were 50,509 households in the county, of which 37.9% had children under the age of 18 living in them. Of all households, 59.7% were married-couple households, 14.9% were households with a male householder and no spouse or partner present, and 18.5% were households with a female householder and no spouse or partner present. About 21.1% of all households were made up of individuals and 8.9% had someone living alone who was 65 years of age or older.

There were 54,467 housing units, of which 7.3% were vacant. Among occupied housing units, 83.4% were owner-occupied and 16.6% were renter-occupied. The homeowner vacancy rate was 1.1% and the rental vacancy rate was 4.6%.

=== Racial and ethnic composition ===
Wright County, Minnesota – Racial and ethnic composition Note: the US Census treats Hispanic/Latino as an ethnic category. This table excludes Latinos from the racial categories and assigns them to a separate category. Hispanics/Latinos may be of any race.
Race / Ethnicity (NH = Non-Hispanic)	Pop 1980	Pop 1990	Pop 2000	Pop 2010	Pop 2020	% 1980	% 1990	% 2000	% 2010	% 2020
White alone (NH)	58,159	67,831	87,489	116,786	126,031	99.11%	98.72%	97.23%	93.65%	89.17%
Black or African American alone (NH)	28	74	232	1,286	2,605	0.05%	0.11%	0.26%	1.03%	1.84%
Native American or Alaska Native alone (NH)	123	231	228	397	331	0.21%	0.34%	0.25%	0.32%	0.23%
Asian alone (NH)	162	272	385	1,459	1,877	0.28%	0.40%	0.43%	1.17%	1.33%
Native Hawaiian or Pacific Islander alone (NH)	x	x	10	42	35	x	x	0.01%	0.03%	0.02%
Other race alone (NH)	39	18	30	77	508	0.07%	0.03%	0.03%	0.06%	0.36%
Mixed race or Multiracial (NH)	x	x	618	1,601	5,253	x	x	0.69%	1.28%	3.72%
Hispanic or Latino (any race)	170	284	994	3,052	4,697	0.29%	0.41%	1.10%	2.45%	3.32%
Total	58,681	68,710	89,986	124,700	141,337	100.00%	100.00%	100.00%	100.00%	100.00%

=== 2010 census ===
The ethnic makeup of the county, according to the 2010 United States census, was the following:

- 95.04% White
- 1.06% Black
- 0.34% Native American
- 1.19% Asian
- 0.04% Native Hawaiian or Pacific Islander
- 1.53% Two or more races
- 0.81% Other races
- 2.45% Hispanic or Latino (of any race)

=== 2000 census ===
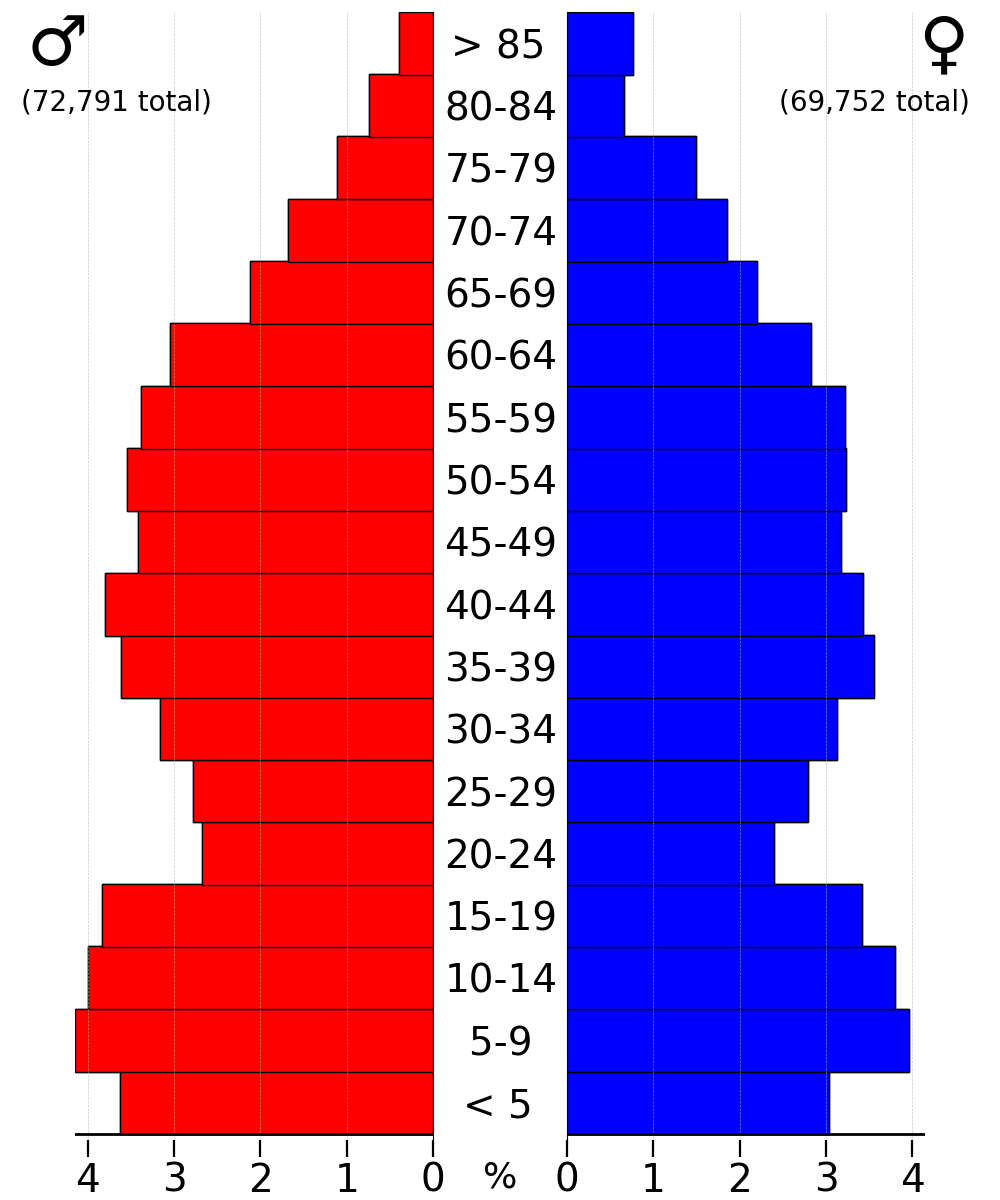
2022 US Census population pyramid for Wright County, from ACS 5-year estimates

As of the census of 2000, there were 89,986 people, 31,465 households, and 23,913 families in the county. The population density was 136 inhabitants per square mile (53/km^{2}). There were 34,355 housing units at an average density of 52 per square mile (20/km^{2}). The racial makeup of the county was 97.85% White, 0.26% Black or African American, 0.28% Native American, 0.44% Asian, 0.01% Pacific Islander, 0.36% from other races, and 0.80% from two or more races. 1.10% of the population were Hispanic or Latino of any race. 42.3% were of German, 11.9% Norwegian, 7.4% Swedish and 6.6% Irish ancestry.

There were 31465 households, out of which 42.10% had children under the age of 18 living with them, 64.50% were married couples living together, 7.70% had a female householder with no husband present, and 24.00% were non-families. 18.80% of all households were made up of individuals, and 6.80% had someone living alone who was 65 years of age or older. The average household size was 2.83 and the average family size was 3.26.

The county population contained 31.10% under the age of 18, 7.60% from 18 to 24, 32.60% from 25 to 44, 19.90% from 45 to 64, and 8.80% over age 64. The median age was 33 years. For every 100 females there were 101.40 males. For every 100 females age 18 and over, there were 99.90 males.

The median income for a household in the county was $53,945, and the median income for a family was $60,940. Males had a median income of $40,630 versus $28,201 for females. The per capita income for the county was $21,844. About 3.60% of families and 4.70% of the population were below the poverty line, including 5.50% of those under age 18 and 7.40% of those age 65 or over.

== Communities ==
=== Cities ===
- Albertville
- Annandale
- Buffalo (county seat)
- Clearwater
- Cokato
- Dayton (Mostly in Hennepin County)
- Delano
- Hanover (Small portion in Hennepin County)
- Howard Lake
- Maple Lake
- Monticello
- Montrose
- Otsego
- Rockford (Partly in Hennepin County)
- South Haven
- St. Michael
- Waverly

=== Townships ===
- Albion
- Buffalo
- Chatham
- Clearwater
- Cokato
- Corinna
- Franklin
- French Lake
- Maple Lake
- Marysville
- Middleville
- Monticello
- Rockford
- Silver Creek
- Southside
- Stockholm
- Victor
- Woodland

=== Census-designated place ===
- Silver Creek

=== Other unincorporated communities ===
- Albion Center
- Albright
- Enfield
- French Lake
- Hasty
- Highland
- Knapp
- Oster
- Rassat
- Rice Lake
- Smith Lake
- Stockholm
- West Albion

=== Ghost town ===
- Dickinson

=== Largest cities in Wright County ===
2020 Rank	City	2010 Census	2020 Census	Percent Increase
1	Otsego	13,571	19,966	+47.12%
2	St. Michael	16,399	18,235	+11.20%
3	Buffalo	15,453	18,168	+17.57%
4	Monticello	12,759	14,455	+13.29%
5	Albertville	7,044	7,896	+12.10%
6	Delano	5,464	6,484	+18.67%
7	Rockford	4,316	4,515	+4.61%
8	Annandale	3,228	3,517	+8.95%
9	Hanover	2,938	3,507	+19.37%
10	Montrose	2,847	3,317	+16.51%
11	Cokato	2,694	2,747	+1.97%

== Government and politics ==
United States presidential election results for Wright County, Minnesota
Year	Republican		Democratic		Third party(ies)	
Year	No.	%	No.	%	No.	%
1860	572	74.87%	188	24.61%	4	0.52%
1864	528	59.73%	356	40.27%	0	0.00%
1868	985	61.26%	623	38.74%	0	0.00%
1872	1,135	54.99%	929	45.01%	0	0.00%
1876	1,482	53.21%	1,280	45.96%	23	0.83%
1880	2,110	61.57%	1,317	38.43%	0	0.00%
1884	2,383	57.49%	1,609	38.82%	153	3.69%
1888	2,877	53.73%	2,133	39.83%	345	6.44%
1892	2,271	48.56%	1,829	39.11%	577	12.34%
1896	3,312	59.37%	2,172	38.93%	95	1.70%
1900	3,153	60.72%	1,888	36.36%	152	2.93%
1904	3,183	75.04%	860	20.27%	199	4.69%
1908	2,820	63.48%	1,396	31.43%	226	5.09%
1912	837	19.42%	1,333	30.94%	2,139	49.64%
1916	2,683	52.24%	2,262	44.04%	191	3.72%
1920	7,013	79.51%	1,299	14.73%	508	5.76%
1924	4,349	47.52%	567	6.20%	4,235	46.28%
1928	6,011	56.57%	4,483	42.19%	132	1.24%
1932	3,406	31.45%	7,205	66.53%	219	2.02%
1936	4,087	36.01%	5,363	47.25%	1,901	16.75%
1940	8,297	67.04%	3,993	32.26%	87	0.70%
1944	6,961	64.99%	3,678	34.34%	72	0.67%
1948	5,589	49.47%	5,523	48.89%	185	1.64%
1952	8,089	64.59%	4,373	34.92%	62	0.50%
1956	7,257	59.42%	4,944	40.48%	12	0.10%
1960	7,180	52.57%	6,452	47.24%	26	0.19%
1964	5,476	38.60%	8,687	61.24%	22	0.16%
1968	6,321	40.13%	8,793	55.82%	639	4.06%
1972	9,996	51.56%	8,695	44.85%	695	3.59%
1976	9,314	39.69%	13,379	57.02%	771	3.29%
1980	12,293	45.54%	12,383	45.88%	2,315	8.58%
1984	15,399	54.82%	12,486	44.45%	205	0.73%
1988	14,987	50.73%	14,177	47.99%	379	1.28%
1992	11,650	33.13%	12,465	35.45%	11,045	31.41%
1996	13,224	37.92%	15,542	44.57%	6,108	17.51%
2000	23,861	55.02%	16,762	38.65%	2,743	6.33%
2004	36,176	60.77%	22,618	37.99%	740	1.24%
2008	37,779	57.61%	26,343	40.17%	1,456	2.22%
2012	40,466	59.67%	25,741	37.96%	1,609	2.37%
2016	43,274	62.16%	20,334	29.21%	6,010	8.63%
2020	51,973	63.05%	28,430	34.49%	2,023	2.45%
2024	57,211	63.54%	30,883	34.30%	1,947	2.16%

County Board of Commissioners
Position	Name	District	Next Election
Commissioner	Tina Diedrick	District 1	2026
Commissioner	Darek Vetsch	District 2	2024
Commissioner	Jeanne Holland	District 3	2026
Commissioner	Nadine Schoen	District 4	2024
Commissioner	Michael Kaczmarek	District 5	2024

State Legislature (2018-2020)
Position	Name	Affiliation	District
Senate	Andrew Mathews	Republican	District 15
Senate	Scott Newman	Republican	District 18
Senate	Bruce Anderson	Republican	District 29
Senate	Mary Kiffmeyer	Republican	District 30
House of Representatives	Shane Mekeland	Republican	District 15B
House of Representatives	Dean Erdahl	Republican	District 18A
House of Representatives	Joe McDonald	Republican	District 29A
House of Representatives	Marion O'Neill	Republican	District 29B
House of Representatives	Eric Lucero	Republican	District 30B

U.S. Congress (2018-2020)
Position	Name	Affiliation	District
House of Representatives	Tom Emmer	Republican	6th
Senate	Amy Klobuchar	Democrat	N/A
Senate	Tina Smith	Democrat	N/A

== See also ==
- National Register of Historic Places listings in Wright County, Minnesota
