= District No. 48 School =

District No. 48 School may refer to:

- District No. 48 School (Dassel, Minnesota), in Collinwood Township, listed on the National Register of Historic Places in Meeker County, Minnesota
- District No. 48 School (Franklin Township, Minnesota), listed on the National Register of Historic Places in Wright County, Minnesota
