= Tarbox =

Tarbox is a surname. Notable persons with that name include:

- Barb Tarbox (1961–2003), Canadian activist
- Bruce Tarbox, American football player
- Charles Tarbox (1891–1978), English cricketer
- Daniel Tarbox Jewett, American politician
- E. D. Hill (born 1961 as Edith Ann Tarbox), American businessperson and journalist
- Elmer Tarbox (1916–1987), American military aviator, businessman, and politician
- Frances Tarbox (1874-1959), American composer
- Increase N. Tarbox (1815–1888), American theologian and author
- Jessie Tarbox Beals, American photographer
- John K. Tarbox (1838–1887), American politician
- Katie Tarbox, American author
- Michael Tarbox (born 1956), American singer-songwriter and guitarist

== See also ==
- Tarbox Ramblers, American band
- Nicherson–Tarbox House, Monticello, Minnesota, United States
- Squire Tarbox House, Westport, Maine, United States
