= David Hanaford Farmstead =

- U.S. National Register of Historic Places
- U.S. Historic district
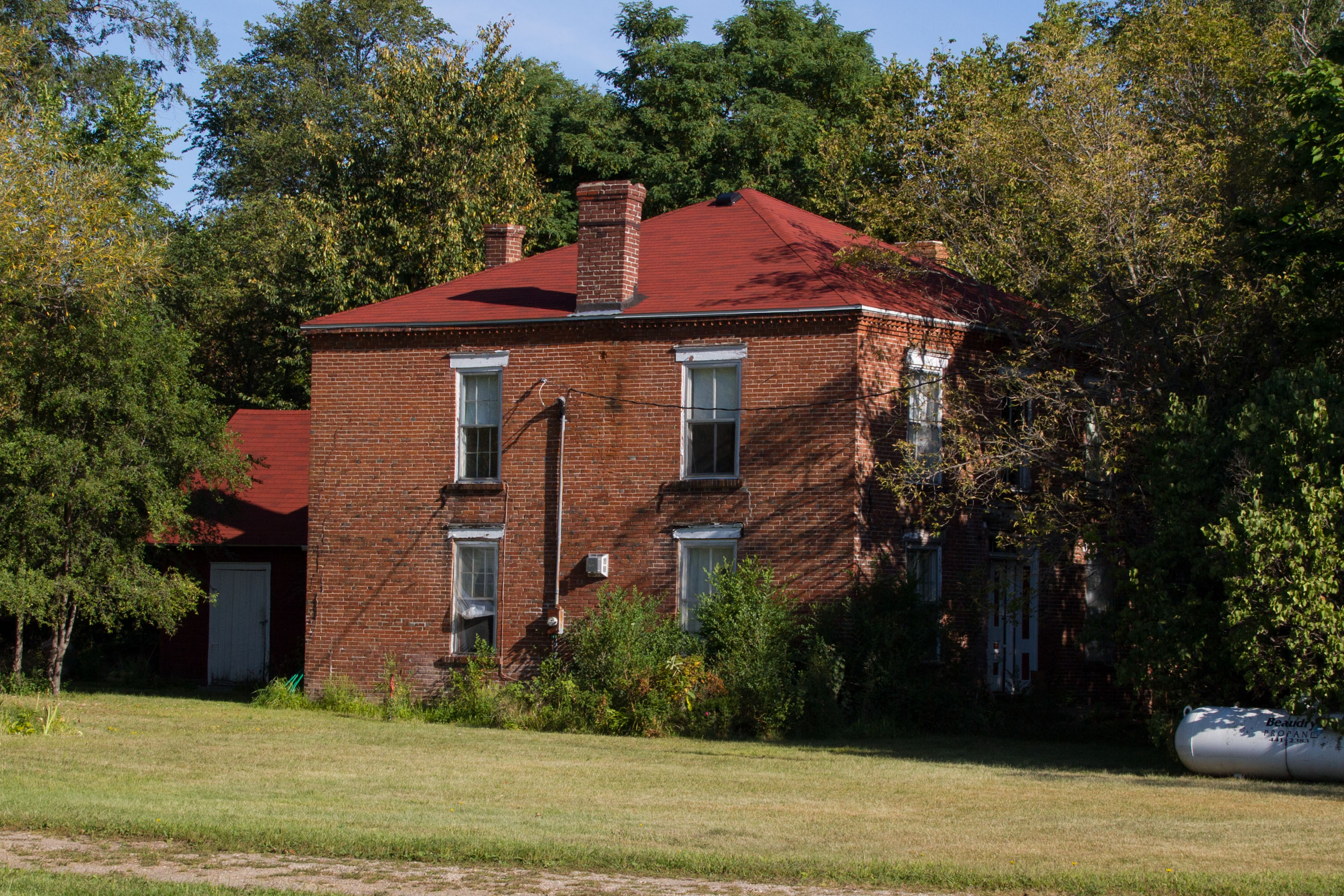
- The David Hanaford Farmhouse from the southeast

- Location within Minnesota Location within the United States
- Location: 8307 Cahill Avenue Northeast, Monticello Township, Minnesota
- Coordinates: 45°16′16″N 93°50′50″W
- Area: 8.9 acres (3.6 ha)
- Built: 1870–c. 1900
- Architect: David Hanaford
- Architectural style: Federal/No style
- MPS: Wright County MRA
- NRHP reference No.: 79001273
- Designated HD: December 11, 1979

The David Hanaford Farmstead is a historic farm in Monticello Township, Minnesota, United States. It was first settled in 1855 and features a farmhouse built in 1870 and a barn from around the same time. The farmstead was listed on the National Register of Historic Places in 1979 for its local significance in the themes of agriculture and exploration/settlement. It was nominated for being "an excellent example of an early Wright County farmstead developed by a pioneer family from New England."

== Description ==
When it was nominated to the National Register in 1979, the farmstead consisted of seven standing buildings, a building ruin, and the sites of four former buildings or structures. As of 2016, several of the supporting buildings have been demolished. As originally listed as a historic district, the 8.9-acre (3.6 ha) property consisted of a farmhouse, barn, granary, brooding house, machine shed, outhouse, and corn crib, plus the ruins of a tool barn and the traces of a log cabin, water well, silo, and windmill.

The 1870 farmhouse is a two-story, cubic building with a timber frame and red brick walls. It was designed in the Federal architecture style. It is topped with a hip roof and has a one-story frame wing at the rear which was built at the same time as the house. The barn, also contemporaneous to the house, measures 50 by 30 feet (15.2 by 9.1 m) and rises two stories. It has a mortise and tenon timber frame sheathed in vertical boards and covered in shiplap siding. The sliding double doors are topped with a multi-pane transom window. The barn has a gable roof and a wood-frame shed attached to the south end.

The other five farm buildings, extant in 1979 but no longer in evidence, were built sometime between 1870 and the early 20th century. All were wood-framed and most had clapboard siding. The granary measured 16 by 18 feet (4.9 by 5.5 m) and rose one and a half stories. The brooding house measured 10 by 10 feet (3.0 m × 3.0 m), the machine shed 30 by 15 feet (9.1 m × 4.6 m), the outhouse 4 by 4 feet (1.2 m × 1.2 m), and the corn crib 10 by 15 feet (3.0 m × 4.6 m). Also visible in 1979 were the depressions left by the Hanafords' original log cabin and well, plus the foundations of a silo and windmill near the barn.

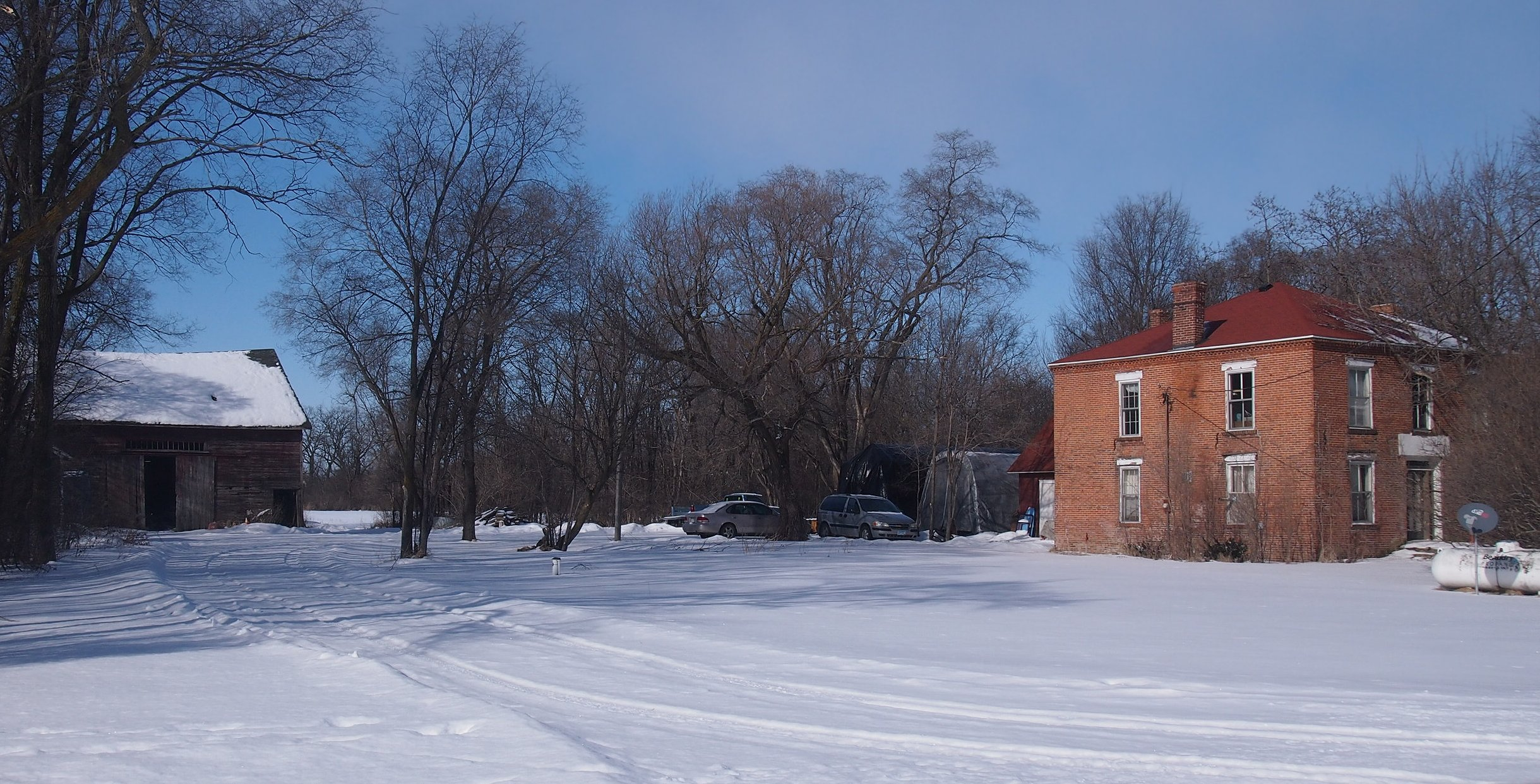
The Hanaford Farmstead in 2016, missing buildings that once stood between the barn and the farmhouse

== History ==
David Hanaford and his family homesteaded this site in 1855, three years after Monticello Township was first settled. For the first 15 years they lived in a log cabin, but in 1870 Hanaford constructed a brick house based on those he was familiar with from his native New Hampshire.

== See also ==
- National Register of Historic Places listings in Wright County, Minnesota
