= National Register of Historic Places listings in Wright County, Minnesota =

Location of Wright County in Minnesota

This is a list of the National Register of Historic Places listings in Wright County, Minnesota. It is intended to be a complete list of the properties and districts on the National Register of Historic Places in Wright County, Minnesota, United States. The locations of National Register properties and districts for which the latitude and longitude coordinates are included below, may be seen in an online map.

There are 20 properties and districts listed on the National Register in the county. A supplementary list includes seven additional sites that were formerly listed on the National Register.

This National Park Service list is complete through NPS recent listings posted December 19, 2025.

== Current listings ==
	Name on the Register	Image	Date listed	Location	City or town	Description
1	August Akerlund Photographic Studio	August Akerlund Photographic Studio	April 11, 1977 (#77000777)	390 Broadway Avenue; 45°04′31″N 94°11′25″W	Cokato	Rare surviving example of an early-20th-century photography studio, built in 1903. Now a component of the Cokato Museum & Akerlund Studio.
2	Church of St. Michael-Catholic	Church of St. Michael-Catholic	December 11, 1979 (#79001279)	Central Avenue and Main Street; 45°12′39″N 93°39′54″W	St. Michael	1890 church significant as the center of a Catholic German immigrant community and for its Gothic Revival architecture.
3	Clearwater Masonic Lodge-Grand Army of the Republic Hall	Clearwater Masonic Lodge-Grand Army of the Republic Hall	December 11, 1979 (#79001259)	205–215 Oak Street; 45°25′17″N 94°02′58″W	Clearwater	1888 meeting hall associated with Wright County's influential fraternal organizations, shared by a Masonic Lodge and a Grand Army of the Republic post.
4	Cokaton P.R.S. Onnen Tovio Raittiusseura	Cokaton P.R.S. Onnen Tovio Raittiusseura	December 12, 1976 (#76001081)	County Highway 3 and County Road 100; 45°07′22″N 94°11′39″W	Cokato vicinity	1896 temperance society clubhouse that also provided general meeting space to a Finnish American community.
5	Delano Village Hall	Delano Village Hall	December 11, 1979 (#79001264)	140 Bridge Avenue East; 45°02′32″N 93°47′17″W	Delano	1888 example of the period's typical municipal buildings, and the long-serving center of government and civic functions in Delano.
6	District No. 48 School	District No. 48 School	December 11, 1979 (#79001267)	U.S. Route 12; 45°03′52″N 93°49′32″W	Delano vicinity	1871 example of Wright County's early rural schoolhouses.
7	Eagle Newspaper Office	Eagle Newspaper Office	December 11, 1979 (#79001265)	300 Railroad Avenue; 45°02′27″N 93°47′10″W	Delano	Three attached buildings built 1883–85, nominated as the longtime home of Delano's oldest business, a newspaper and print shop established in 1872.
8	First Congregational Church of Clearwater	First Congregational Church of Clearwater	December 11, 1979 (#79001260)	405 Bluff Street; 45°25′10″N 94°03′04″W	Clearwater	1861 church noted for its Greek Revival architecture, association with the area's Yankee settlers, and temporary fortification after the Dakota War of 1862.
9	David Hanaford Farmstead	David Hanaford Farmstead	December 11, 1979 (#79001273)	8307 Cahill Avenue N.E. 45°16′16″N 93°50′50″W	Monticello vicinity	Farm with an 1870 farmhouse, representative of the homesteads established in Wright County by settlers from New England.
10	Hanover Bridge	Hanover Bridge	December 11, 1979 (#79001268)	Off County Highway 19 over the Crow River; 45°09′12″N 93°39′43″W	Hanover	Oldest and most intact example—built in 1885—of the pin-connected Pratt truss bridges once common in Wright County. Now restricted to pedestrian traffic. Extends into Hennepin County.
11	Dr. E.P. Hawkins Clinic, Hospital and House	Dr. E.P. Hawkins Clinic, Hospital and House	December 11, 1979 (#79001277)	210–230 Buffalo Avenue South; 45°04′04″N 93°54′39″W	Montrose	Adjacent circa-1885 house, 1903 hospital, and 1913 clinic exemplifying Wright County's medical facilities at the turn of the 20th century.
12	Howard Lake City Hall	Howard Lake City Hall	December 11, 1979 (#79001269)	737, 739, and 741 Sixth Street; 45°03′39″N 94°04′13″W	Howard Lake	Prominent Queen Anne municipal hall built in 1904.
13	Marysville Swedesburg Lutheran Church	Marysville Swedesburg Lutheran Church	December 11, 1979 (#79001270)	County Highway 9; 45°06′57″N 93°57′08″W	Waverly vicinity	Exemplary brick Gothic Revival parish church built in 1891; also noted for its association with a Swedish immigrant community.
14	Nicherson-Tarbox House, Shed and Barn	Nicherson-Tarbox House, Shed and Barn	December 11, 1979 (#79001274)	514 East Broadway; 45°18′11″N 93°47′15″W	Monticello	1889 house and outbuildings; a prominent and well-preserved example of Queen Anne and Shingle Style architecture in Monticello.
15	Rufus Rand Summer House and Carriage Barn	Rufus Rand Summer House and Carriage Barn	December 11, 1979 (#79001275)	1 Old Territorial Road; 45°17′54″N 93°47′08″W	Monticello	1884 summer home representative of the late-19th-century country estates built by Twin Cities businessmen; also noted for its Queen Anne architecture and association with utility executive Rufus Rand (d. 1921).
16	St. Mark's Episcopal Chapel	St. Mark's Episcopal Chapel	December 11, 1979 (#79001272)	10536 108th Street N.W. 45°18′39″N 94°06′23″W	Annandale vicinity	Well-preserved board-and-batten Gothic Revival church, built in 1871.
17	Thayer Hotel	Thayer Hotel	August 24, 1978 (#78001573)	60 Elm Street West; 45°15′44″N 94°07′32″W	Annandale	1895 example of Wright County's large, frame hotels of the late 19th/early 20th centuries.
18	Waverly Village Hall	Waverly Village Hall	June 6, 2002 (#02000613)	204 Fourth Street; 45°04′00″N 93°58′02″W	Waverly	1939 municipal hall representative of the civic facilities made possible with New Deal federal assistance; also noted for its Moderne architecture and role as a community event space.
19	William W. Webster House	William W. Webster House	December 11, 1979 (#79001261)	205 Spring Street; 45°25′20″N 94°03′04″W	Clearwater	Circa-1863 Greek Revival house of a notable settler who helped develop Clearwater.
20	Simon Weldele House	Simon Weldele House	December 11, 1979 (#79001266)	309 River Street; 45°02′37″N 93°47′23″W	Delano	Well-preserved 1893 example of the restrained Queen Anne style houses of Wright County towns, and one of the few architecturally significant residences remaining in Delano.

== Former listings ==
	Name on the Register	Image	Date listed	Date removed	Location	City or town	Description
1	Albertville Roller Mill		December 11, 1979 (#79001258)	November 1, 2018	5790 Main Avenue N.E.	Albertville	Circa-1909 example of a steam-powered flour mill built in a town served by railroad—rather than river—transportation. Demolished in 2006.
2	Henry C. Bull House	Henry C. Bull House	December 11, 1979 (#79001262)	May 7, 1990	195 East Third Street	Cokato	Built in 1878, demolished in 1988.
3	Marsh Octagon Barn		December 11, 1979 (#79001278)	August 2, 2000	Off County Highway 14	Rockford vicinity	Built in 1880, burned down in 1992.
4	Tobias G. Mealey House	Tobias G. Mealey House	December 12, 1976 (#76001082)	January 10, 2020	Territorial Road; 45°17′54″N 93°47′02″W	Monticello	House dating to 1855 of influential local settler, entrepreneur, and politician Tobias Mealey (1823–1904).
5	Middleville Township Hall		December 11, 1979 (#79001271)	August 2, 2000	County Highway 6	Howard Lake vicinity	Built in 1905, burned down by fire department for practice in 1994.
6	Simpson Methodist Episcopal Church	Simpson Methodist Episcopal Church	December 11, 1979 (#79001276)	November 3, 2004	Fourth and Linn Streets (original address); Current coordinates are 45°18′15″N 93°48′06″W	Monticello	Early Methodist church built in 1857. Moved in 2004.
7	Titrud Round Barn		December 11, 1979 (#79001263)	April 26, 1993	County Highway 30	Cokato vicinity	1908 round barn. Destroyed June 16, 1992, during the Mid-June 1992 tornado outbreak.

== See also ==
- List of National Historic Landmarks in Minnesota
- National Register of Historic Places listings in Minnesota
