= Simon Weldele House =

Historic house in Minnesota, United States

- U.S. National Register of Historic Places
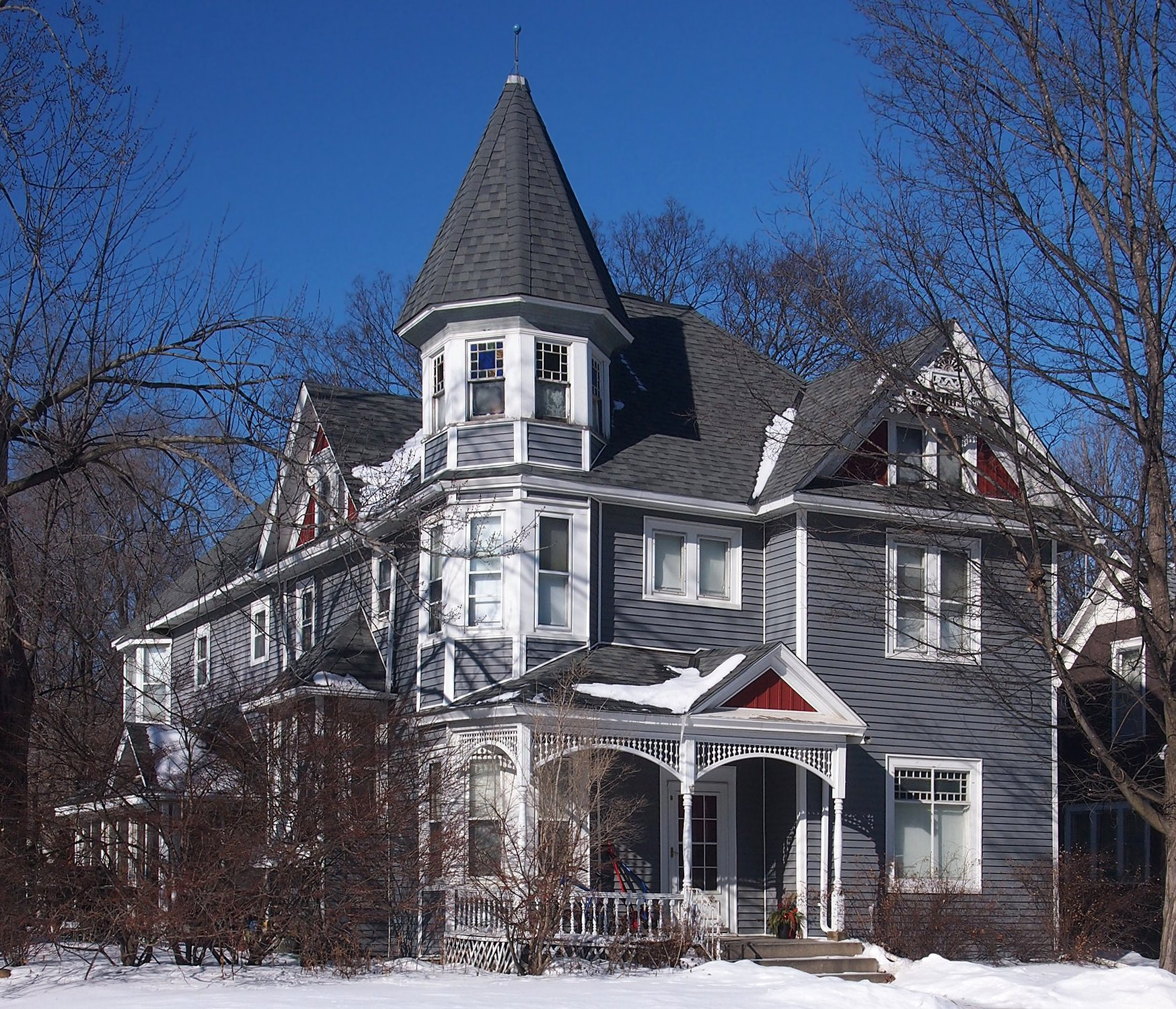
- The Simon Weldele House from the southeast

- Location within Minnesota Location within the United States
- Location: 311 River Street, Delano, Minnesota
- Coordinates: 45°2′37.3″N 93°47′22.7″W
- Area: Less than one acre
- Built: 1893
- Architectural style: Queen Anne
- MPS: Wright County MRA
- NRHP reference No.: 79001266
- Designated: December 11, 1979

The Simon Weldele House is a historic house in Delano, Minnesota, United States, built in 1893. It was listed on the National Register of Historic Places in 1979 for having local significance in the theme of architecture. It was nominated as one of the few architecturally significant residences surviving in Delano, and a well-preserved example of the restrained Queen Anne houses once common in Wright County.

== Description ==
The Simon Weldele House is a wood frame building rising two and a half stories. It is irregular in plan, with multiple gables emerging from a hip roof, and a polygonal corner tower. Elements of Queen Anne style include the wraparound porch with turned posts, fretwork gable panels, stained glass, and polychrome exterior.

== History ==
Simon Weldele was born in 1860 in nearby Buffalo Township and moved to Delano, a growing railroad town, in 1884, where he opened a saloon. This house, constructed in 1893, was the first in Delano to have a hot water heater. Weldele was remembered for being active in civic and church affairs.

== See also ==
- National Register of Historic Places listings in Wright County, Minnesota
