= Marysville Township, Wright County, Minnesota =

Marysville Township, Minnesota
- Township
- Location within the state of Minnesota Marysville Township, Minnesota (the United States)
- Coordinates: 45°6′N 93°57′W
- Country: United States
- State: Minnesota
- County: Wright

Area
  - Total: 33.9 sq mi (87.8 km^{2})
  - Land: 32.5 sq mi (84.3 km^{2})
  - Water: 1.4 sq mi (3.5 km^{2})
- Elevation: 922 ft (281 m)

Population (2000)
  - Total: 2,097
  - Density: 64/sq mi (24.9/km^{2})
- Time zone: UTC-6 (Central (CST))
  - Summer (DST): UTC-5 (CDT)
- FIPS code: 27-40940
- GNIS feature ID: 0664927
- Website: http://www.marysvilletwp.com/

Marysville Township is a township in Wright County, Minnesota, United States. The population was 2,097 at the 2000 census.

Marysville Township was organized in 1866, having been settled chiefly by Roman Catholics. The 1891 Marysville Swedesburg Lutheran Church is listed on the National Register of Historic Places.

== Geography ==
According to the United States Census Bureau, the township has a total area of 33.9 square miles (87.8 km^{2}), of which 32.5 square miles (84.3 km^{2}) is land and 1.3 square miles (3.5 km^{2}) (3.95%) is water.

Marysville Township is located in Township 119 North of the Arkansas Base Line and Range 26 West of the 5th Principal Meridian.

== Demographics ==
As of the census of 2000, there were 2,097 people, 696 households, and 556 families residing in the township. The population density was 64.4 inhabitants per square mile (24.9/km^{2}). There were 714 housing units at an average density of 21.9 per square mile (8.5/km^{2}). The racial makeup of the township was 98.00% White, 0.33% African American, 0.43% Native American, 0.14% Asian, 0.14% from other races, and 0.95% from two or more races. Hispanic or Latino of any race were 1.96% of the population.

There were 696 households, out of which 40.2% had children under the age of 18 living with them, 67.1% were married couples living together, 6.6% had a female householder with no husband present, and 20.0% were non-families. 14.2% of all households were made up of individuals, and 3.0% had someone living alone who was 65 years of age or older. The average household size was 2.96 and the average family size was 3.30.

In the township the population was spread out, with 30.6% under the age of 18, 7.2% from 18 to 24, 31.1% from 25 to 44, 23.6% from 45 to 64, and 7.5% who were 65 years of age or older. The median age was 34 years. For every 100 females, there were 109.9 males. For every 100 females age 18 and over, there were 110.7 males.

The median income for a household in the township was $53,011, and the median income for a family was $57,768. Males had a median income of $36,935 versus $27,396 for females. The per capita income for the township was $21,171. About 5.7% of families and 9.5% of the population were below the poverty line, including 15.9% of those under age 18 and 6.6% of those age 65 or over.
