= Franklin Township, Wright County, Minnesota =

Franklin Township, Minnesota
- Township
- Location within the state of Minnesota Franklin Township, Minnesota (the United States)
- Coordinates: 45°2′N 93°50′W
- Country: United States
- State: Minnesota
- County: Wright

Area
  - Total: 43.9 sq mi (113.8 km^{2})
  - Land: 42.8 sq mi (110.9 km^{2})
  - Water: 1.1 sq mi (2.8 km^{2})
- Elevation: 932 ft (284 m)

Population (2000)
  - Total: 2,774
  - Density: 65/sq mi (25/km^{2})
- Time zone: UTC-6 (Central (CST))
  - Summer (DST): UTC-5 (CDT)
- FIPS code: 27-22400
- GNIS feature ID: 0664219
- Website: https://www.franklinmn.net/

Franklin Township is a rural township in Wright County, Minnesota, United States. The township population was 2,774 at the 2000 census.

== History ==
Franklin Township was originally called Newport Township, and under the latter name was organized in 1858. It was soon afterwards changed to Franklin, there being another township in the state with a similar name. It was then named in honor of Benjamin Franklin. The 1871 District No. 48 School in Franklin Township is listed on the National Register of Historic Places.

== Geography ==
According to the United States Census Bureau, the township has a total area of 43.9 square miles (114 km^{2}), of which 42.8 square miles (111 km^{2}) is land and 1.1 square miles (2.8 km^{2}) (2.48%) is water.

The city of Delano is located within Franklin Township geographically, but is a separate entity.

Franklin Township is located in Township 118 North of the Arkansas Base Line and Range 25 West of the 5th Principal Meridian.

== Demographics ==
As of the census of 2000, there were 2,774 people, 889 households, and 784 families residing in the township. The population density was 64.8 inhabitants per square mile (25.0/km^{2}). There were 907 housing units at an average density of 21.2 per square mile (8.2/km^{2}). The racial makeup of the township was 98.63% White, 0.11% African American, 0.32% Native American, 0.58% Asian, 0.04% Pacific Islander, 0.14% from other races, and 0.18% from two or more races. Hispanic or Latino of any race were 0.83% of the population.

There were 889 households, out of which 40.3% had children under the age of 18 living with them, 81.0% were married couples living together, 3.8% had a female householder with no husband present, and 11.7% were non-families. 8.1% of all households were made up of individuals, and 2.8% had someone living alone who was 65 years of age or older. The average household size was 3.05 and the average family size was 3.25.

In the township the population was spread out, with 27.4% under the age of 18, 7.1% from 18 to 24, 27.6% from 25 to 44, 27.3% from 45 to 64, and 10.6% who were 65 years of age or older. The median age was 39 years. For every 100 females, there were 106.6 males. For every 100 females age 18 and over, there were 102.6 males.

The median income for a household in the township was $68,750, and the median income for a family was $71,321. Males had a median income of $40,662 versus $32,117 for females. The per capita income for the township was $27,429. About 1.4% of families and 1.7% of the population were below the poverty line, including 0.4% of those under age 18 and 8.1% of those age 65 or over.
