= Nicherson–Tarbox House =

Historic house in Minnesota, United States

- Nicherson-Tarbox House, Shed and Barn
- U.S. National Register of Historic Places
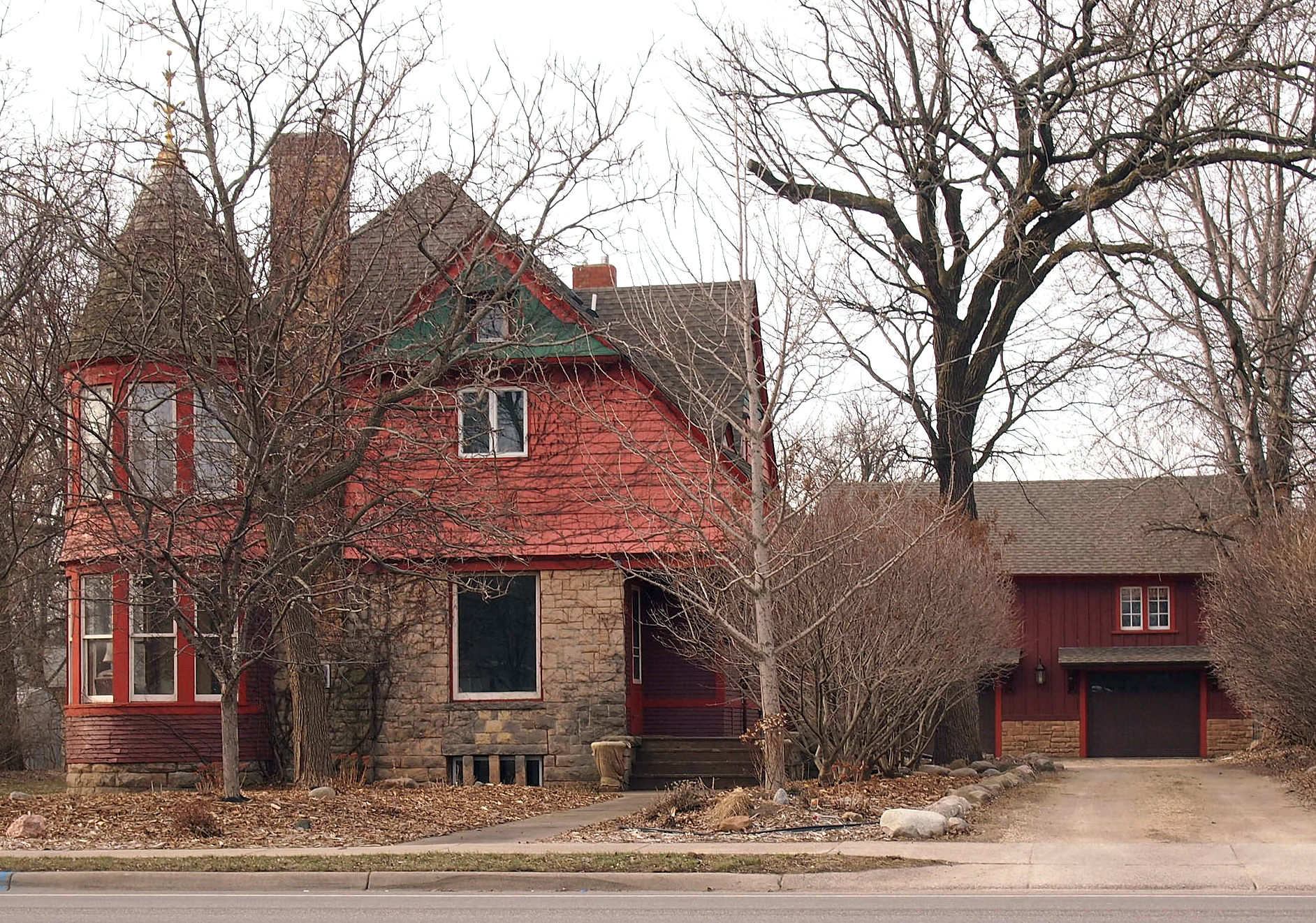
- The Nicherson–Tarbox House and Barn from the north-northeast

- Location within Minnesota Location within the United States
- Location: 514 Broadway Street E., Monticello, Minnesota
- Coordinates: 45°18′10.7″N 93°47′14.7″W
- Area: Less than one acre
- Built: 1889
- Architectural style: Queen Anne, Shingle Style
- MPS: Wright County MRA
- NRHP reference No.: 79001274
- Designated: December 11, 1979

The Nicherson–Tarbox House is a historic house in Monticello, Minnesota, United States. It was built in 1889 in a blend of Queen Anne and Shingle Style architecture. A barn was moved to the rear of the lot around the turn of the 20th century to serve as a carriage house, now a detached garage. The property, which contained a second outbuilding that is no longer extant, was listed on the National Register of Historic Places in 1979 as the Nicherson–Tarbox House, Shed and Barn for its local significance in the theme of architecture. It was nominated for being a prominent and well-preserved example of Queen Anne and Shingle Style architecture in Monticello.

== Description ==
The Nicherson–Tarbox House is a two-story building with irregular massing and a prominent tower at the northeast corner. Random-coursed pink granite blocks form the lower level walls, foundation, and chimney. In places, the lower level is sheathed in narrow clapboard. The upper level, gables, and roof are clad in cedar wood shingles. The exterior retains a polychrome treatment typical of the period.

The barn is a one-and-a-half-story wooden structure. Its board and batten siding and Gothic Revival door panels suggest that its construction predates the house. At the time of the property's National Register nomination, a one-story shed stood near the back of the house. It had clapboard siding, a gable roof, and polychrome decoration similar to the main house. It no longer appears to be extant.

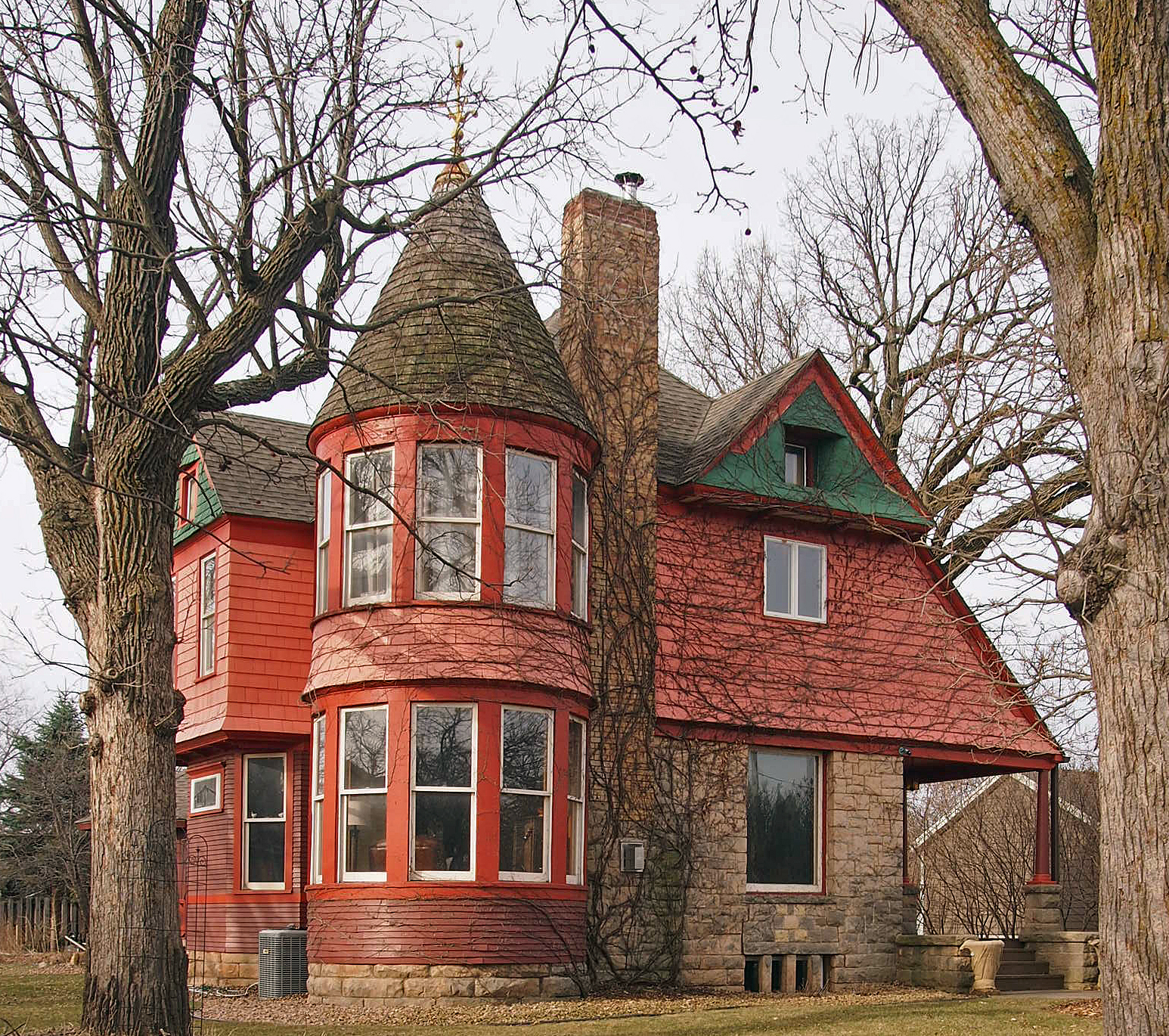
The Nicherson–Tarbox House from the northeast

== History ==
The house was built in 1889 for Evert A. Nicherson, a local lumberman. In the late 1890s, the house was purchased by James C. Tarbox, a prominent Wright County attorney and judge. Tarbox acquired an old barn from a farm in Monticello Township and had it moved onto the property. He used it to house his carriage and the horses to pull it, with hay stored in the loft above.

== See also ==
- National Register of Historic Places listings in Wright County, Minnesota
