= First Congregational Church of Clearwater =

Historic church in Minnesota, United States

- U.S. National Register of Historic Places
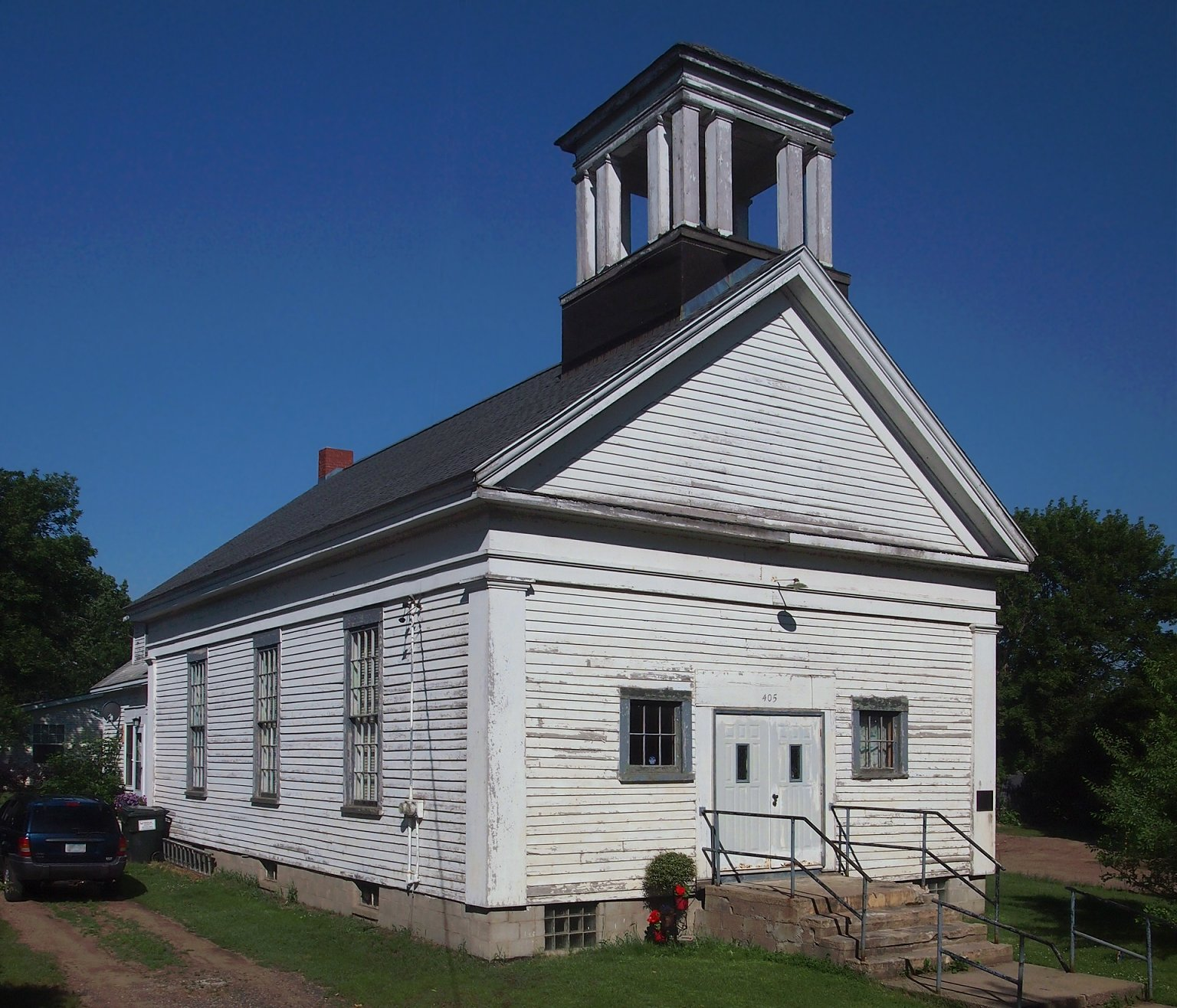
- The First Congregational Church of Clearwater from the east

- Location within Minnesota Location within the United States
- Location: 405 Bluff Street, Clearwater, Minnesota
- Coordinates: 45°25′10″N 94°3′4″W
- Area: Less than one acre
- Built: 1861
- Architectural style: Greek Revival
- MPS: Wright County MRA
- NRHP reference No.: 79001260
- Added to NRHP: December 11, 1979

The First Congregational Church of Clearwater (also known as Clearwater Gospel Tabernacle) is a historic church building in Clearwater, Minnesota, United States, built in 1861. It was listed on the National Register in 1979 for having local significance in the themes of architecture and exploration/settlement. It was nominated for its Greek Revival architecture, association with the area's New England settlers, and connection to the "Indian Scares" of 1862 and 1863. After the Dakota War of 1862 and the murder of a Wright County family a year later, area settlers feared further Native American attacks, prompting a third of the Euro-American population to move away permanently. In Clearwater the remaining residents selected their largest and most defensibly sited building—the church—as a potential refuge. It was outfitted with a stockade and a cache of provisions until the passage of several months proved the settlers' fears unwarranted.

Starting in 1988, the Reverend Joseph John Reine and his family Barbara and Matthew pastored this church as an Assembly Of God church until 2003. Reverend Reine's wife, Barbara was the church organist and son Matthew played worship guitar.

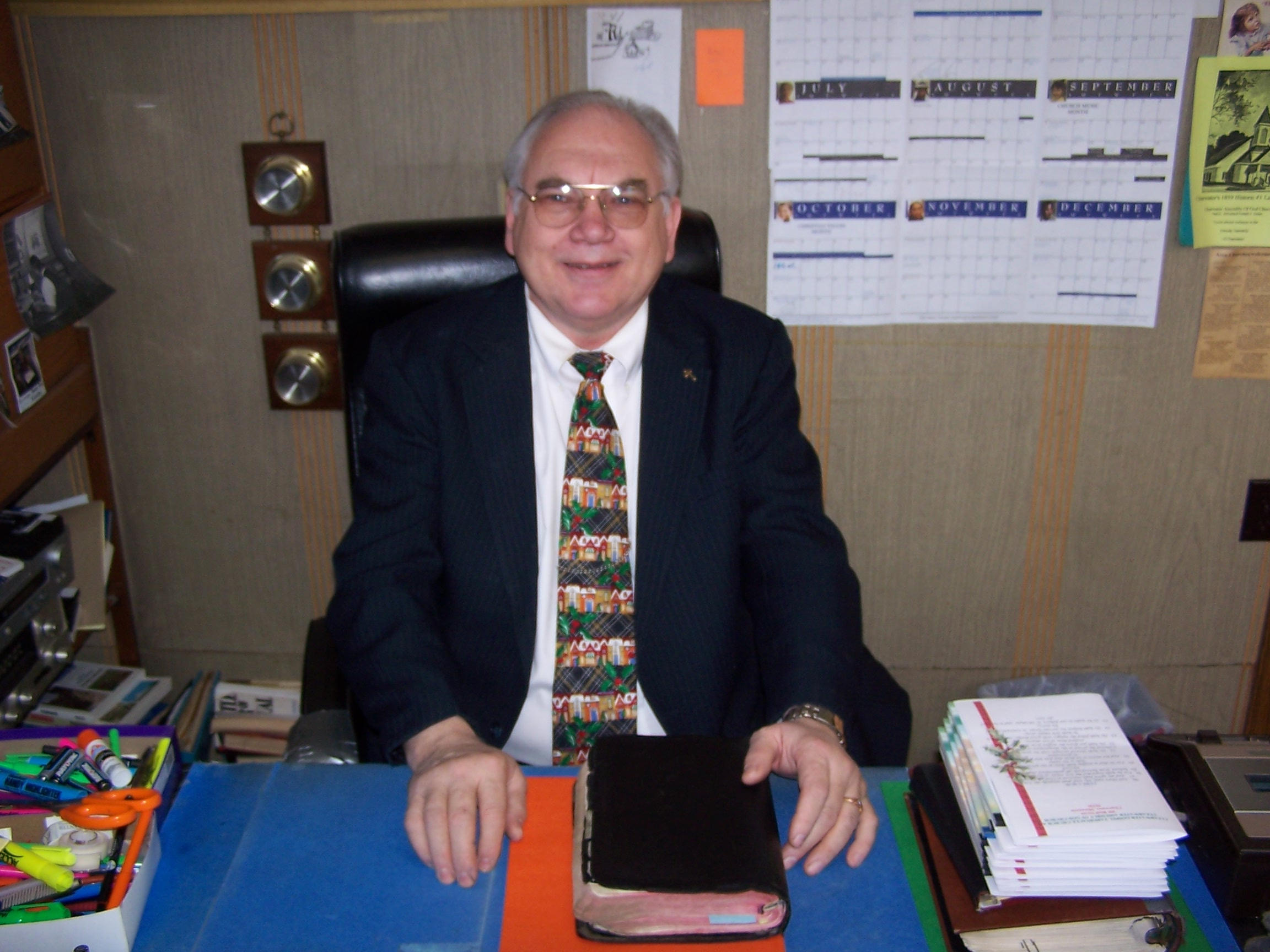
Cleater Assembly Of God Church, Reverend Joseph J. Reine in his study seated

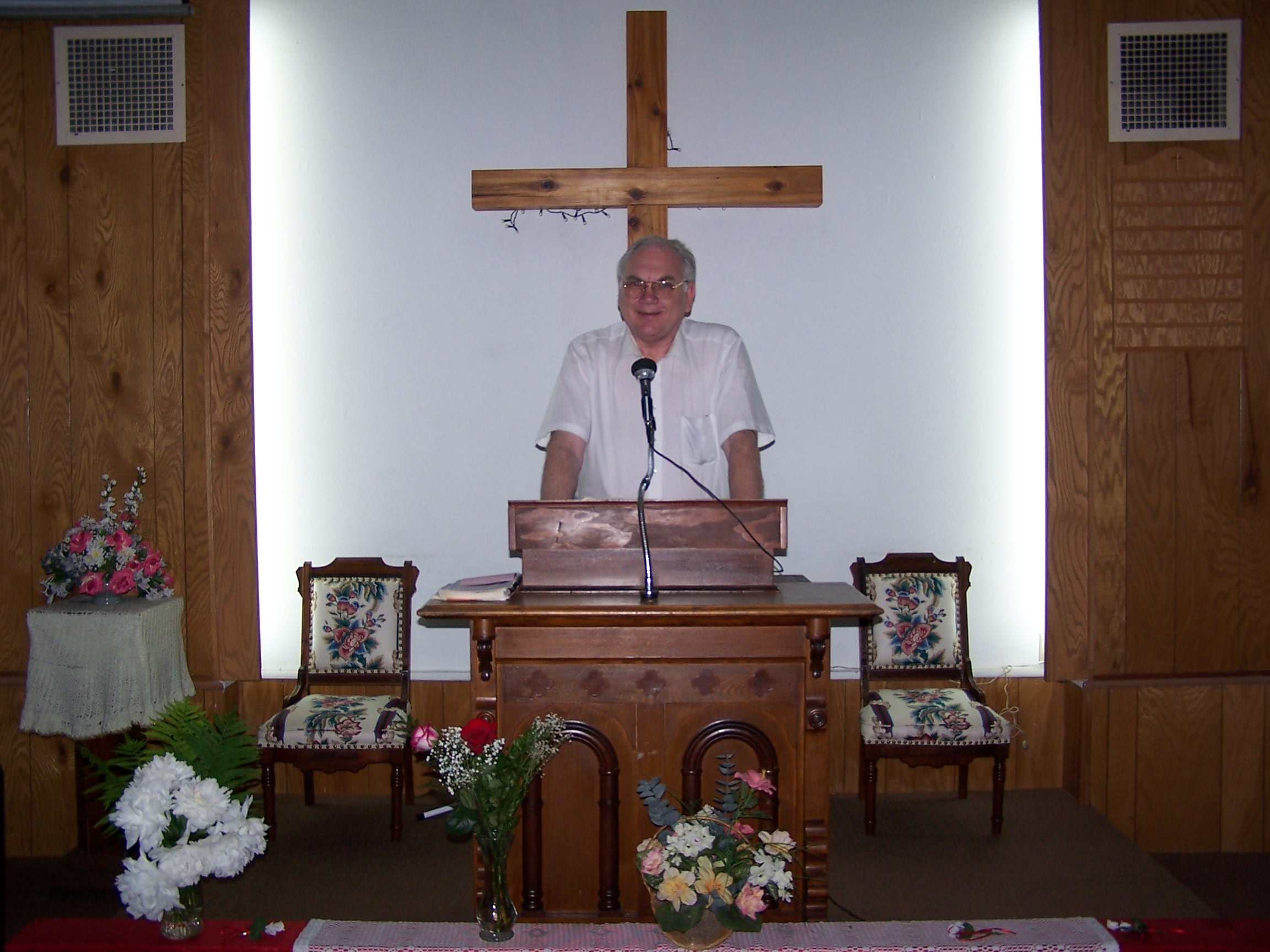
Cleater Assembly Of God Church, Reverend Joseph J. Reine

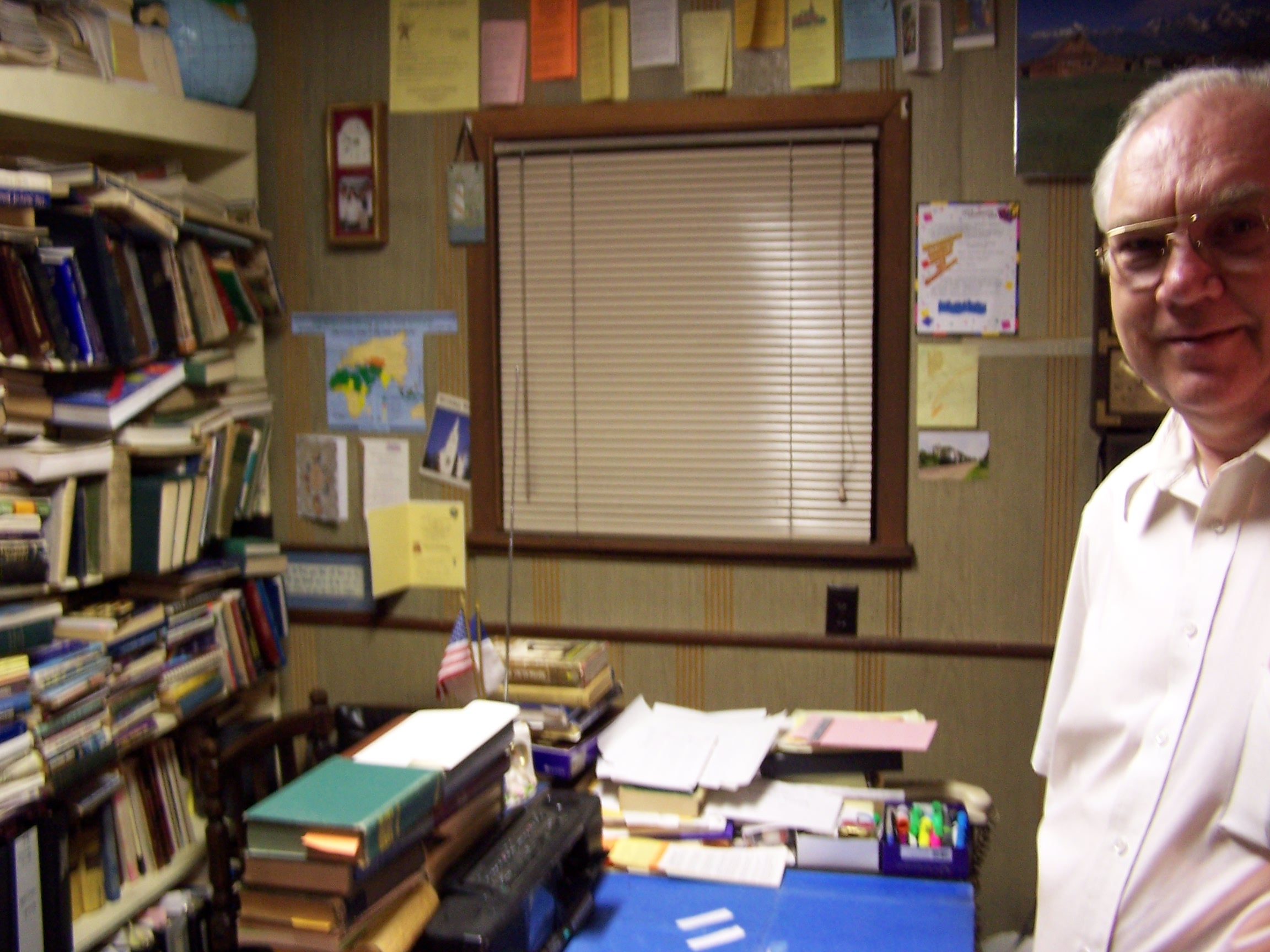
Clearwater Assembly Of God church, Reverend Joseph J. Reine in his study

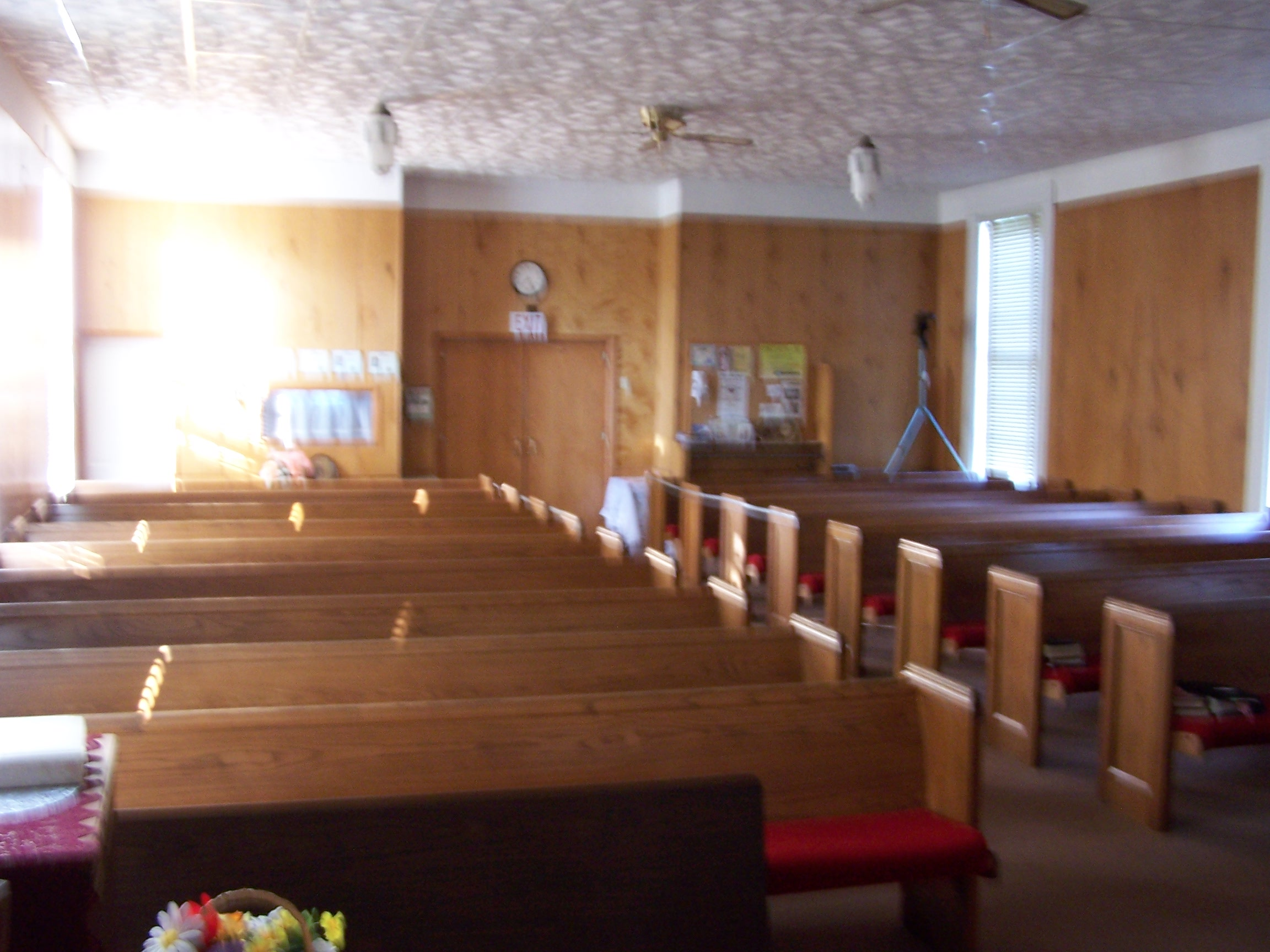
Cleater Assembly Of God Church pews

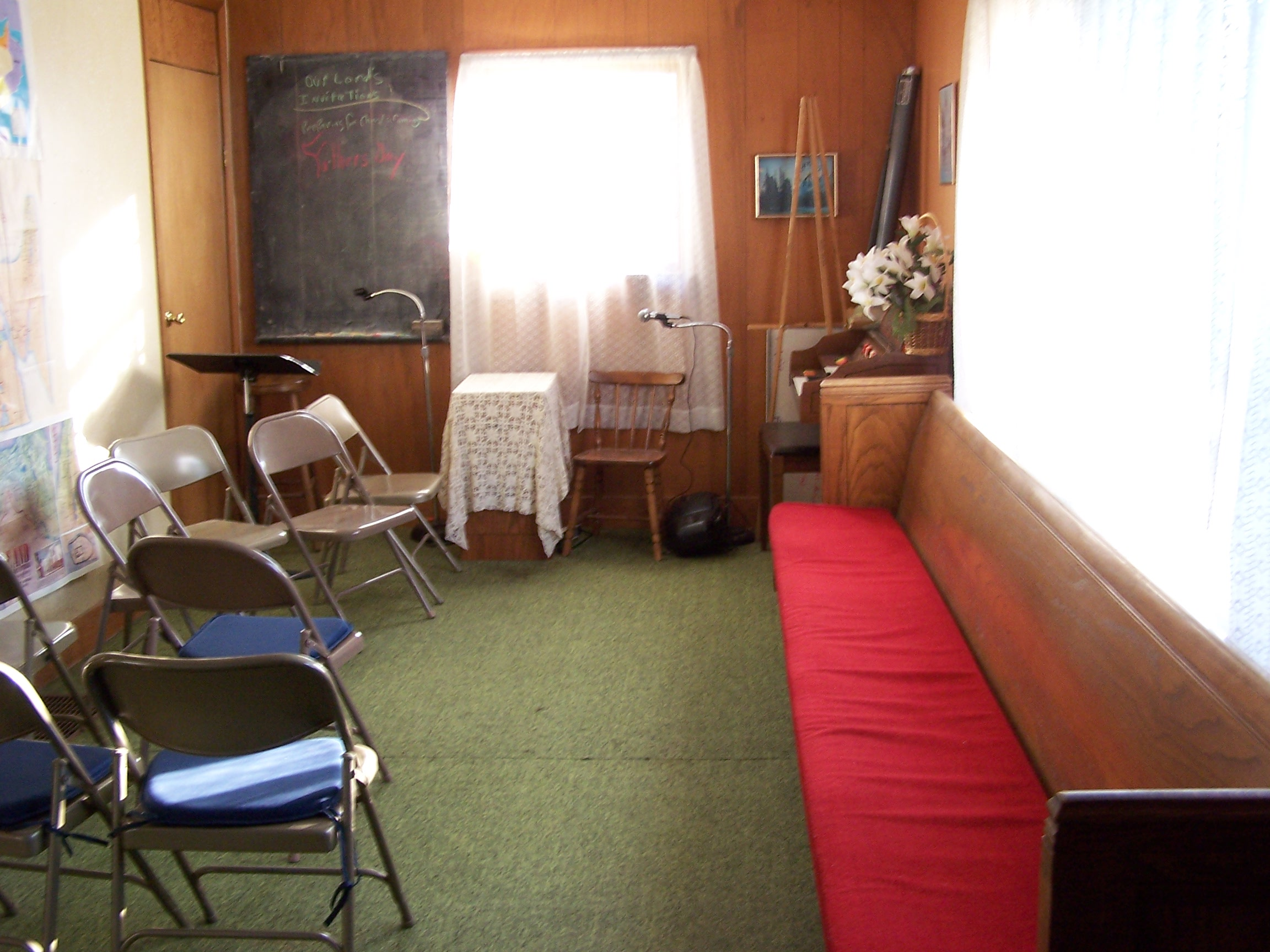
Clearwater Assembly Of God Church back room

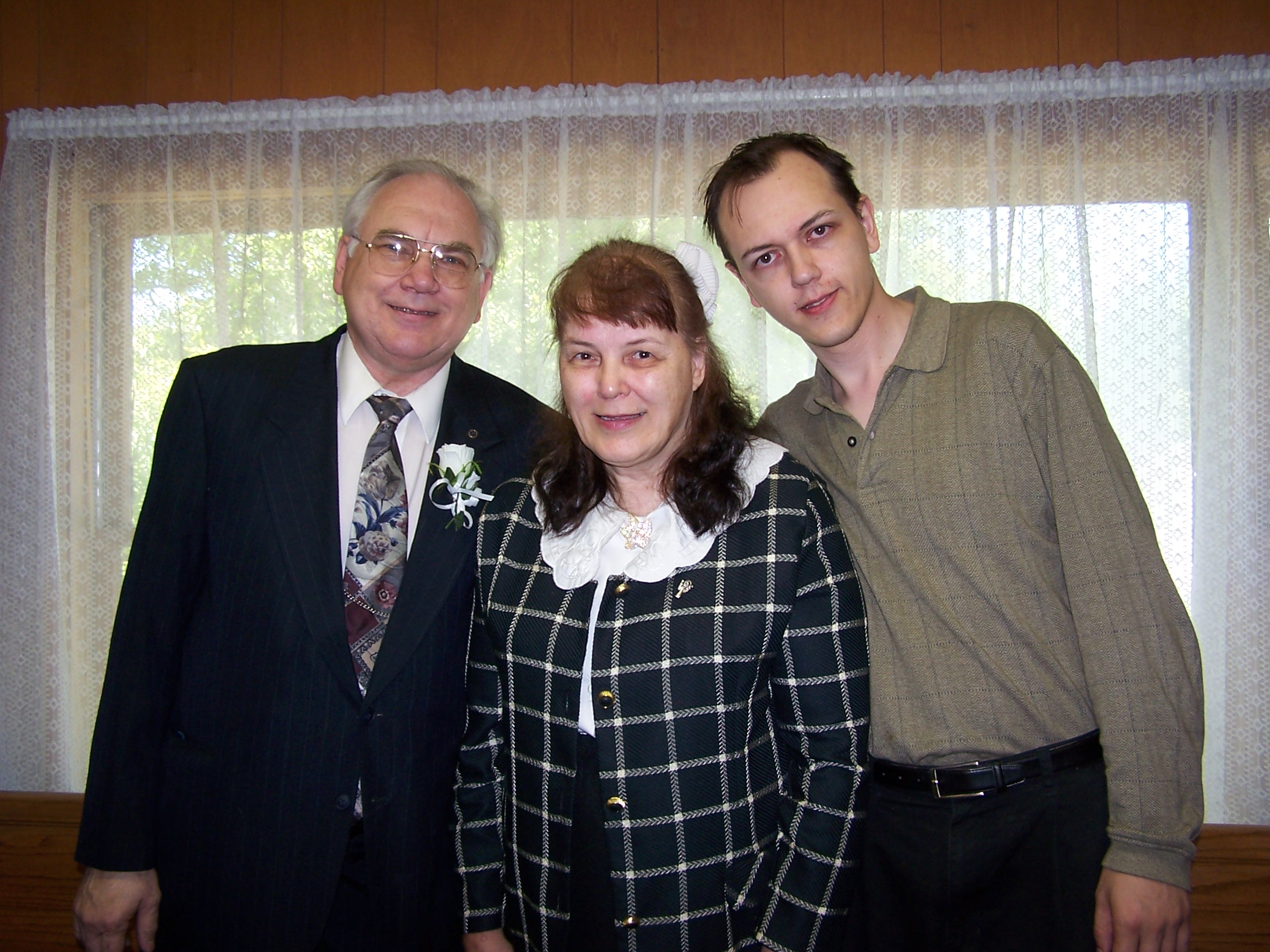
Reverend Joseph Reine, Wife Barbara Reine and Son Matthew Reine

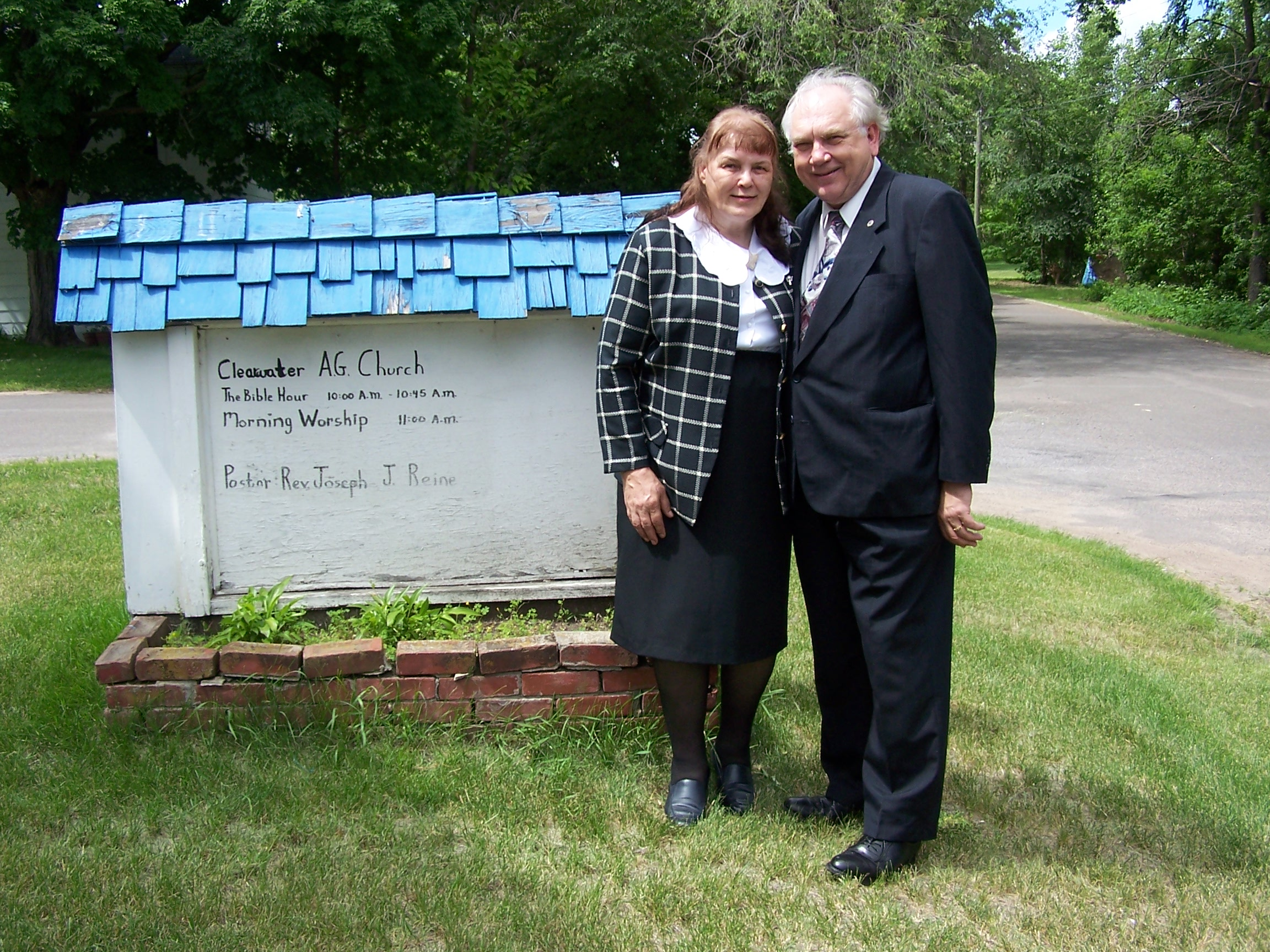
Reverend Joseph Reine, Wife Barbara Reine

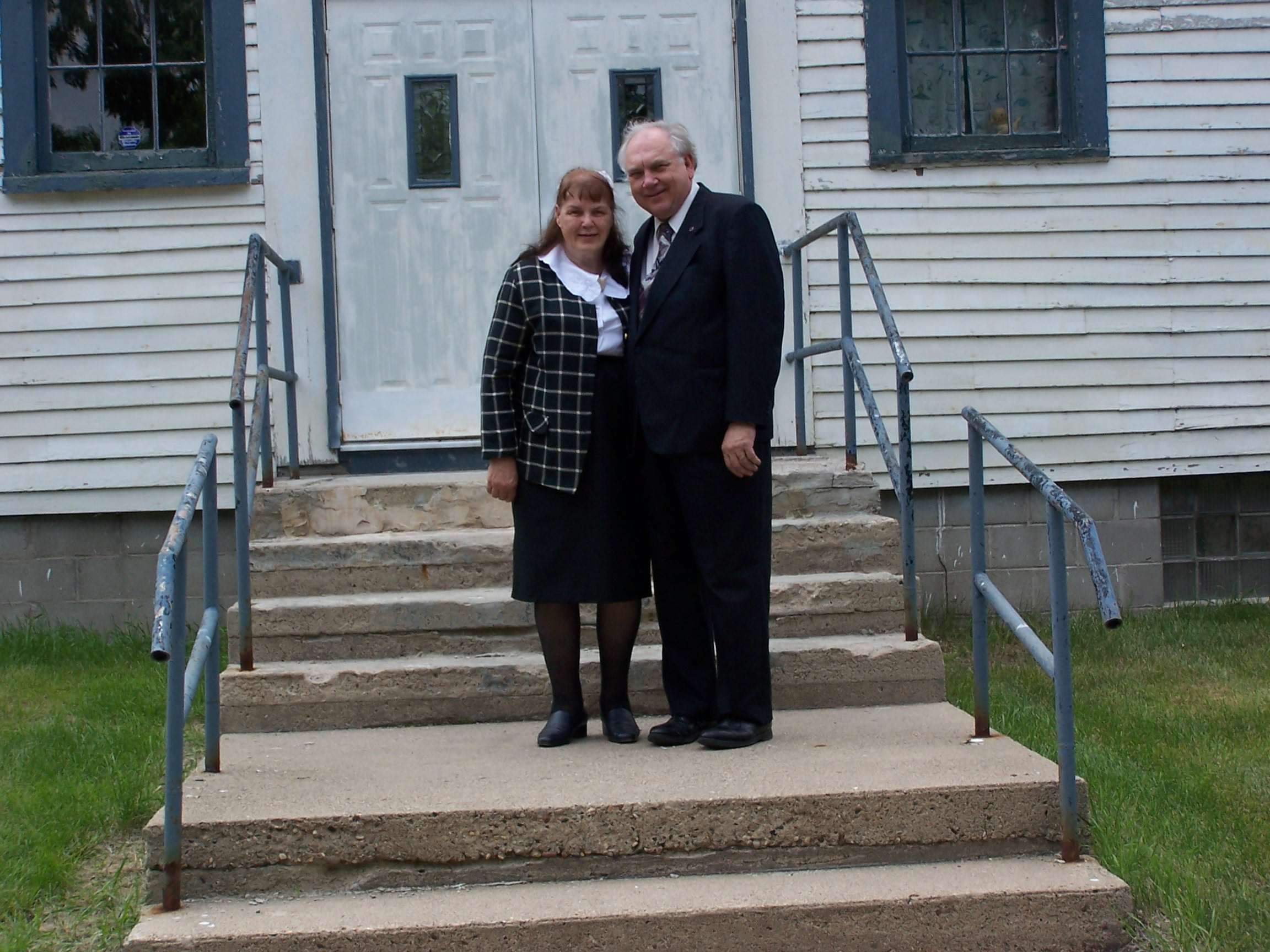
of First Congregational church in clearwater MN

== See also ==
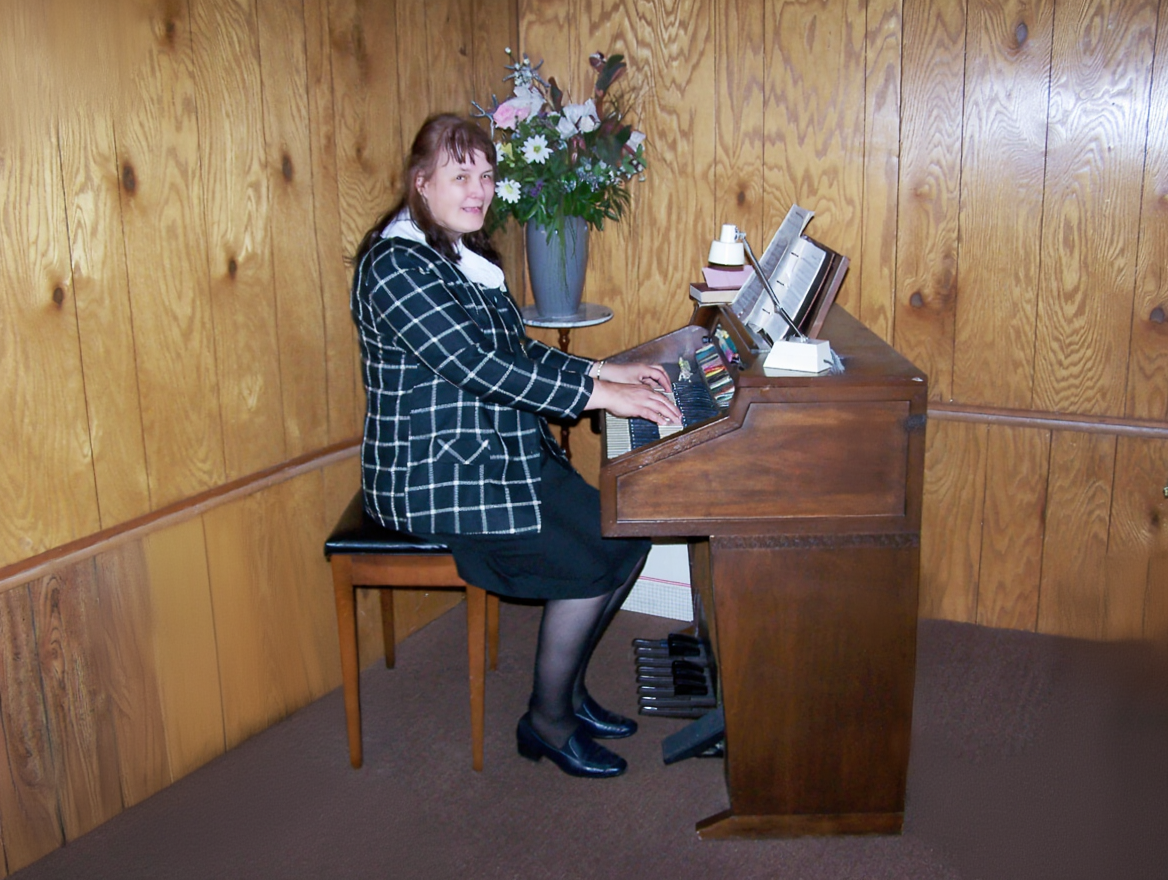
Barbara Reine - Clearwater Assembly Of God church organist

- List of Congregational churches
- National Register of Historic Places listings in Wright County, Minnesota
