= Dr. E.P. Hawkins Clinic, Hospital, and House =

- Dr. E.P. Hawkins Clinic, Hospital and House
- U.S. National Register of Historic Places
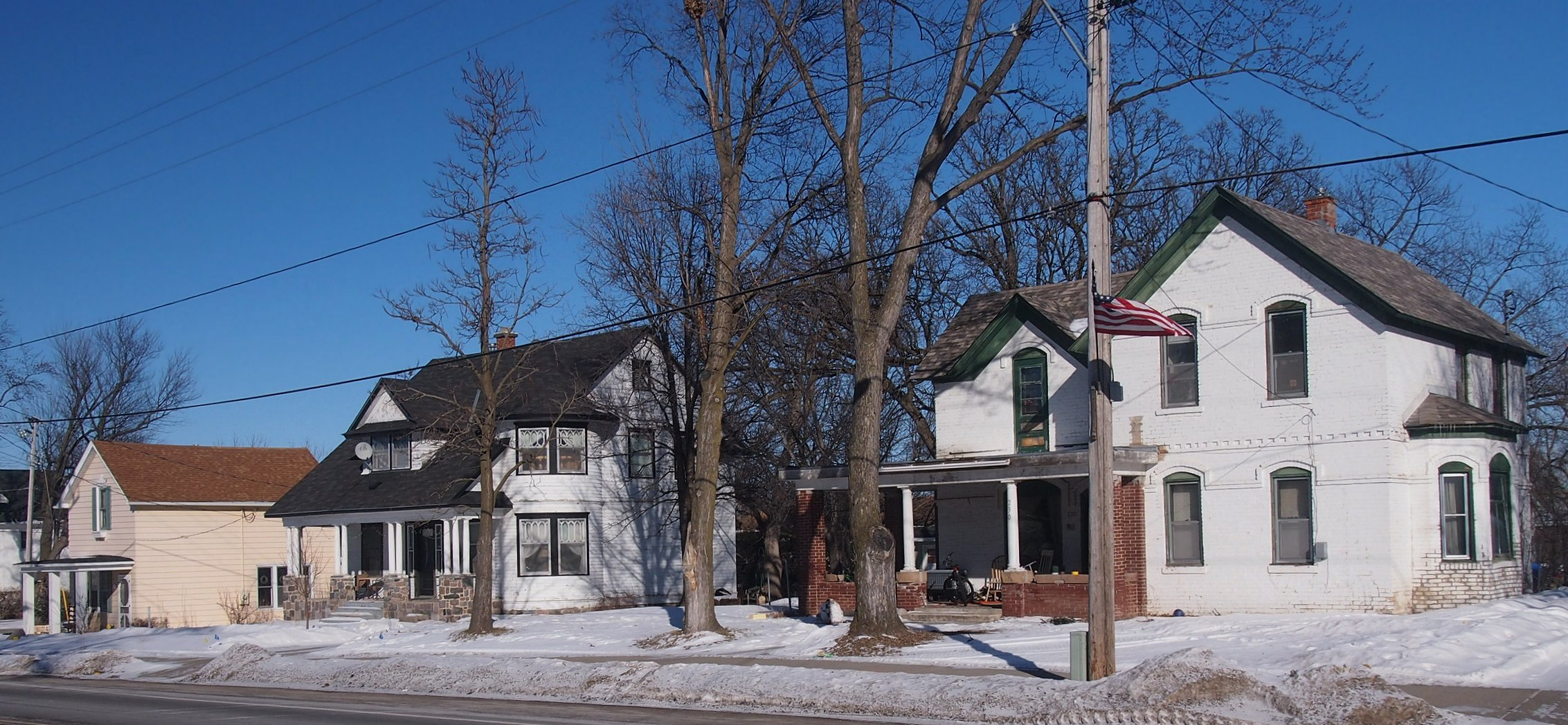
- The Dr. E.P. Hawkins Clinic, Hospital and House (left to right) from the southwest

- Location within Minnesota Location within the United States
- Location: 210–230 Buffalo Avenue South, Montrose, Minnesota
- Coordinates: 45°4′3.5″N 93°54′39.5″W
- Area: 1 acre (0.40 ha)
- Built: c. 1885, c. 1890, and 1903
- MPS: Wright County MRA
- NRHP reference No.: 79001277
- Designated: December 11, 1979

The Dr. E.P. Hawkins Clinic, Hospital, and House comprise a historic former medical complex in Montrose, Minnesota, United States. Hawkins established his medical practice in 1897 in the front room of his residence. As his practice grew, however, he had a ten-bed hospital constructed next door in 1903, and ten years later acquired an adjacent building to use as a clinic and nursing school. The three-building complex was listed on the National Register of Historic Places in 1979 for having local significance in the theme of health/medicine. It was nominated for exemplifying Wright County's medical facilities at the turn of the 20th century.

== Description ==
The Dr. E.P. Hawkins Clinic, Hospital, and House are three adjacent buildings standing north to south, respectively. The house, at the south end of the trio, was built circa 1885. It is a two-story brick residence with an L-shaped footprint and a gable roof. Each story has a line of decorative brickwork that snakes over the windows in stylized hoods. Another line of brickwork embellishes the horizon between the two floors. In later years the brick façade was painted, and a porch with Doric order columns added. A one-story frame garage behind the house is original to the property.

The central building was purpose-built in 1903. It has a gable roof which slopes to the top of the second floor at the rear but down to the first floor at the front. A dormer emerges from the elongated front slope, and a cylindrical tower with a conical roof projects from the building's southwest corner. The gables are embellished with diamond shingles. A porch spans the whole width of the front façade, with a stone foundation and pairs of Doric columns. The garage behind this building was constructed in 1974.

The clinic was originally a small residence built circa 1890. It is a simple two-story frame building with a gable roof.

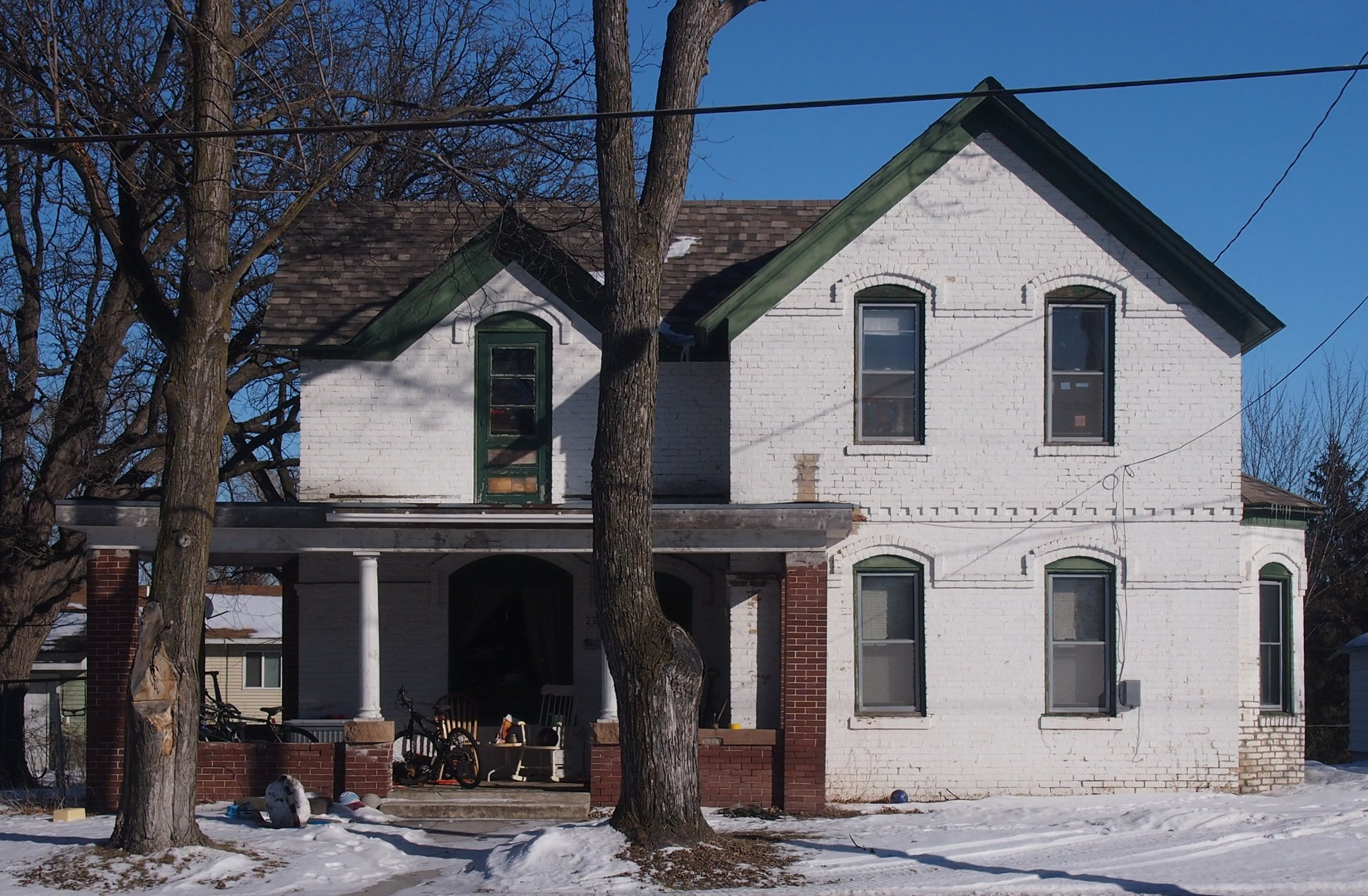
The Hawkins House

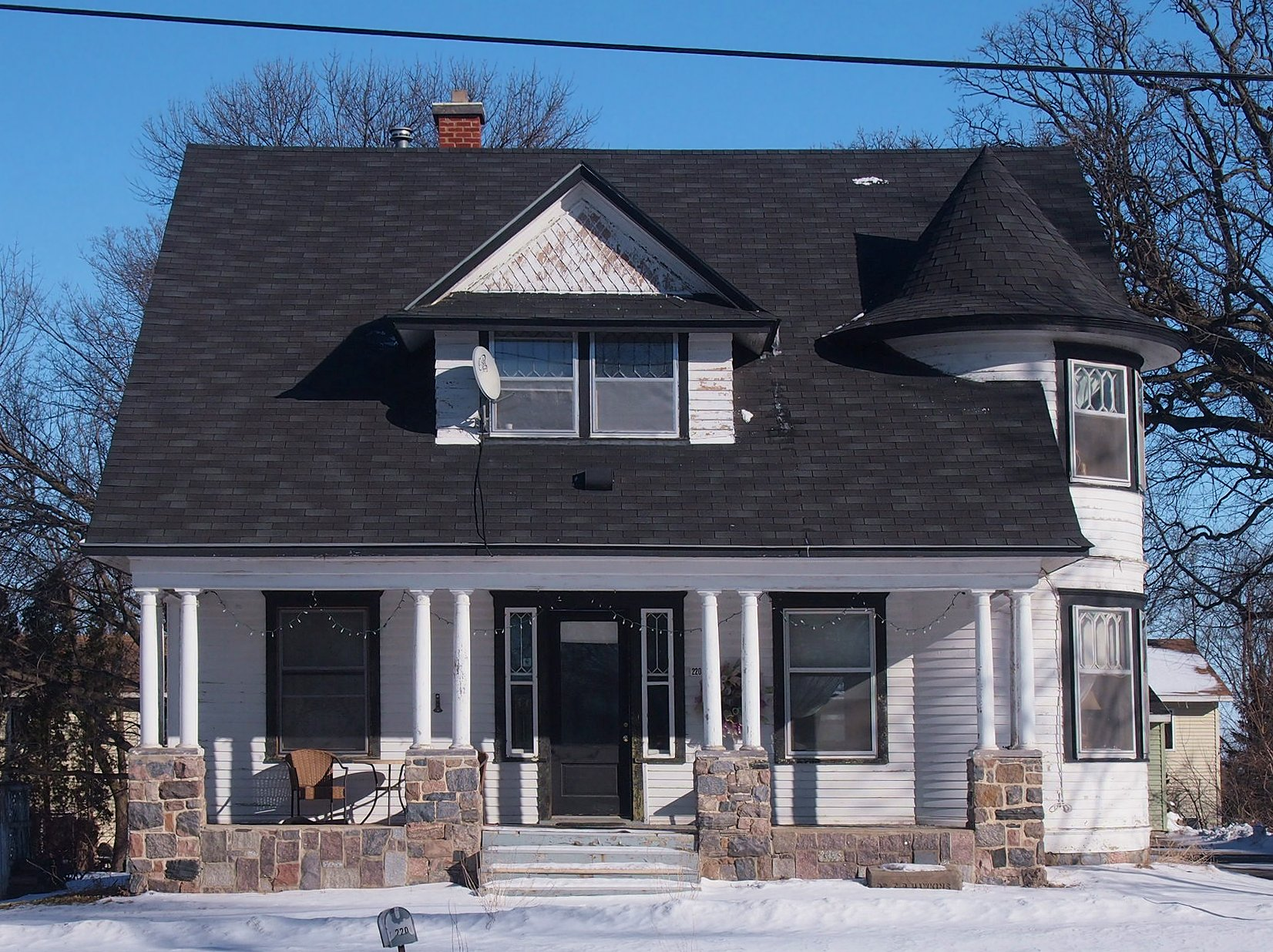
The hospital

== History ==
E.P. Hawkins was born in Carthage, Illinois, in 1863 and earned his doctorate from the University of Michigan. Arriving in the railroad town of Montrose he established his medical practice in October 1897, operating out of two rooms on the ground floor of the house he shared with his wife Vera. The practice was successful enough that in 1903 Hawkins had Wright County's first hospital constructed next to his home. Opening the following year, the facility contained ten beds for patients and rooms for general care and surgery.

Hawkins acquired the third building in 1913 and moved his office into the first floor. It had previously been the home of a Mr. Wright, who had helped maintain the Hawkins' garden. The following year Dr. Hawkins established a three-year nursing school, the Montrose Training School for Nurses, and used the upper floor of the new clinic as classroom space.

== See also ==
- National Register of Historic Places listings in Wright County, Minnesota
