= Clearwater Masonic and Grand Army of the Republic Hall =

Historic building in Minnesota, United States

Clearwater Masonic Lodge and Grand Army of the Republic Hall
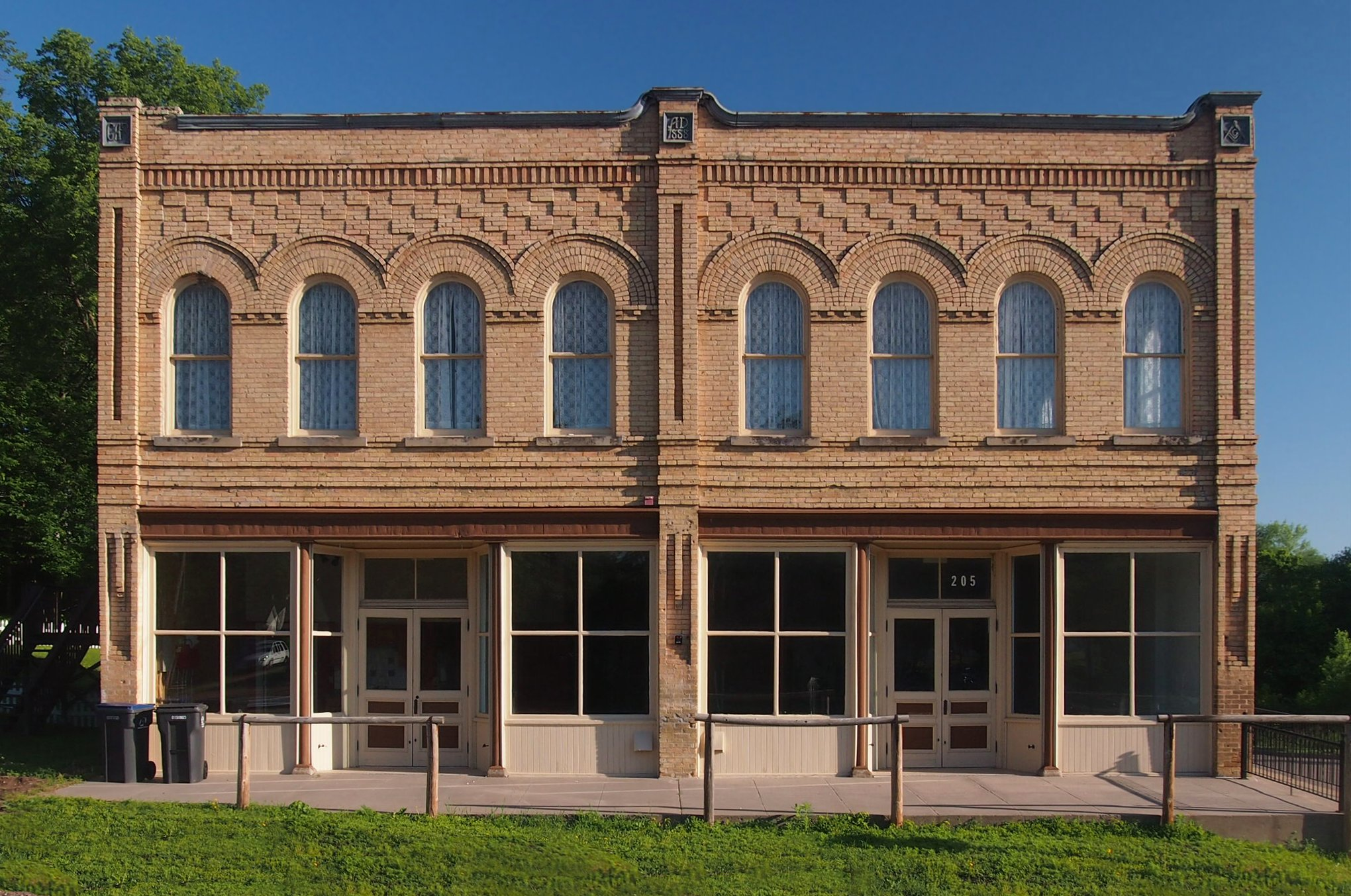
- Grand Army of the Republic Hall from the southeast
- Interactive map of the Clearwater Masonic Lodge and Grand Army of the Republic Hall area

General information
- Status: Completed
- Type: Commercial
- Architectural style: Italianate
- Location: 205–215 Oak Street, Clearwater, Minnesota, United States
- Coordinates: 45.4216°N 94.0496°W
- Elevation: 965 ft (294 m)
- Opened: 1888
- Owner: Clearwater Lodge No. 28, Ancient Free & Accepted Masons of Minnesota
- Affiliation: A.C. Collins Grand Army of the Republic Post No. 112

Technical details
- Size: 2,202 sq ft (204.6 m^{2})
- Floor count: 2
- Floor area: 4,404 sq ft (409.1 m^{2})
- Grounds: < 1 acre (0.40 ha)
- Clearwater Masonic Lodge–Grand Army of the Republic Hall
- U.S. National Register of Historic Places
- MPS: Wright County MRA
- NRHP reference No.: 79001259
- Added to NRHP: December 11, 1979

The Clearwater Masonic and Grand Army of the Republic Hall is a historic building in Clearwater, Minnesota, United States, constructed in 1888. It has served as a meeting hall for both a local Grand Army of the Republic (GAR) post, and a local Masonic Lodge, with commercial space on the ground floor. It was listed on the National Register of Historic Places in 1979 under the name Clearwater Masonic Lodge–Grand Army of the Republic Hall for having local significance in the themes of architecture and social history. It was nominated for its association with the fraternal organizations of Clearwater and many other rural Wright County communities that, in the words of historian John J. Hackett, "provided leadership, direction, and contributions to the county's political, educational, patriotic, and social life."

== History ==
The building was constructed jointly by the A.C. Collins Grand Army of the Republic Post No. 112 and Clearwater Masonic Lodge No. 28. The former was one of 192 GAR posts in Minnesota. The Masonic Lodge continues to meet in the building.

The meeting halls are on the second floor, while the ground floor is split into two units leased to commercial tenants for income, a common arrangement in the region.

== See also ==
- List of Masonic buildings in the United States
- National Register of Historic Places listings in Wright County, Minnesota
