= Marysville Swedesburg Lutheran Church =

Historic church in Minnesota, United States

- U.S. National Register of Historic Places
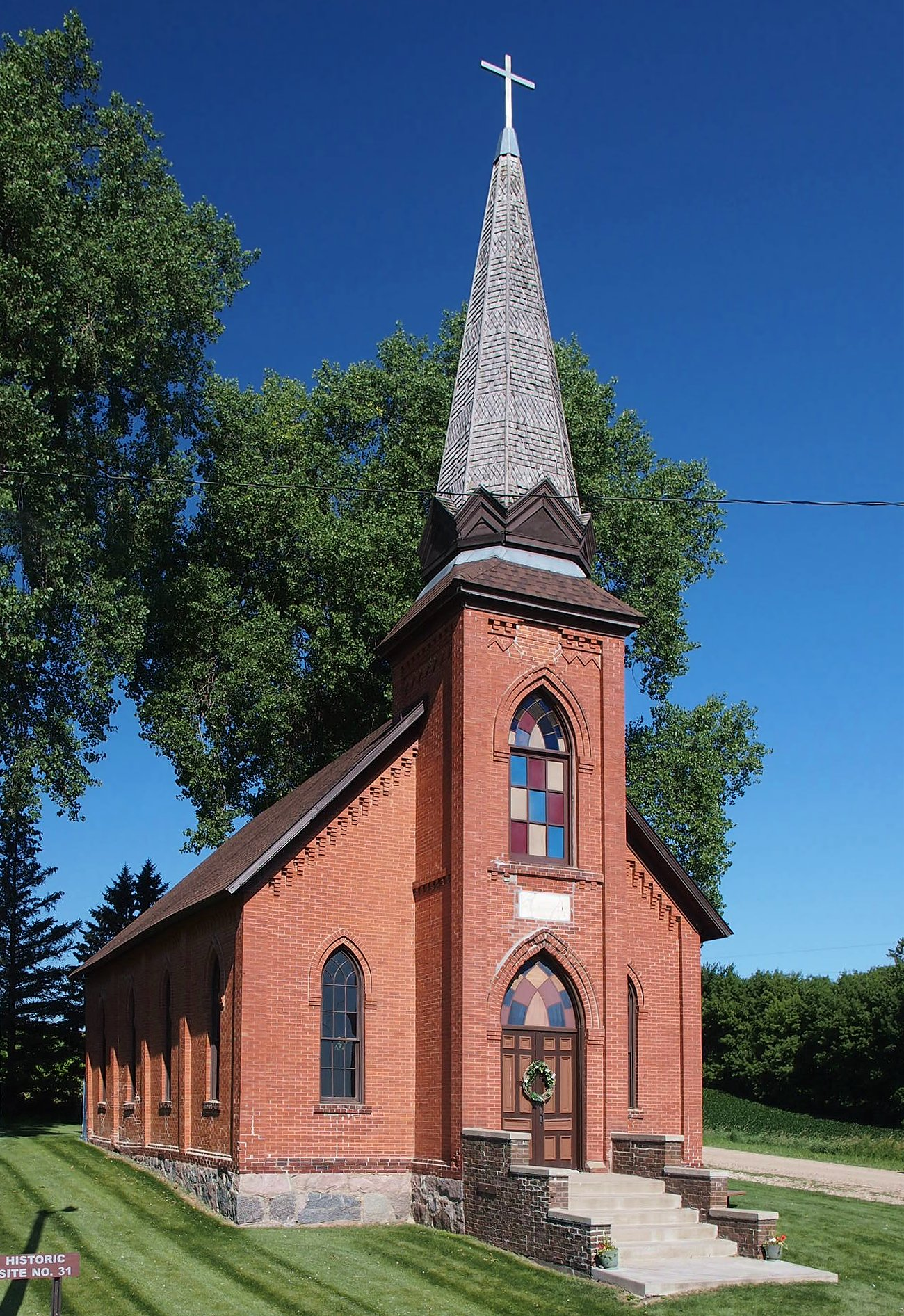
- The Marysville Swedesburg Lutheran Church from the east-southeast

- Location within Minnesota Location within the United States
- Location: 2505 Dempsey Avenue SW (County Highway 9), Marysville Township, Minnesota
- Nearest city: Waverly, Minnesota
- Coordinates: 45°6′57″N 93°57′8.5″W
- Area: Less than one acre
- Built: 1891
- Architectural style: Gothic Revival
- MPS: Wright County MRA
- NRHP reference No.: 79001270
- Added to NRHP: December 11, 1979

Marysville Swedesburg Lutheran Church is a historic church in Marysville Township, Minnesota, United States, built in 1891. It was listed on the National Register of Historic Places in 1979 for having local significance in the themes of architecture, exploration/settlement, and religion. It was nominated as one of Wright County's finest examples of a brick Gothic Revival parish church and for its association with the area's Swedish immigrants.

The community got its start with the arrival of Swedish settlers in 1869. On February 25, 1873, the parish was organized, and the following year they built a church of hewn logs. The community constructed its present building starting in 1891, with donated brick on a donated lot, and it was finished in 1893. The community worshipped in this building until 1950, when they voted to dissolve the congregation and merge with Zion Lutheran Church (formerly known as Carlslund Swedish Evangelical Lutheran Church) in Buffalo. The community continued to worship in the Marysville church while a new church building was built in Buffalo. In 1973 the community restored the Marysville church to celebrate the centennial of the building's founding. The community continues to hold worship services on Monday evenings during June, July, and August.

== See also ==
- List of Lutheran churches
- National Register of Historic Places listings in Wright County, Minnesota
