= William W. Webster House =

Historic house in Minnesota, United States

- U.S. National Register of Historic Places
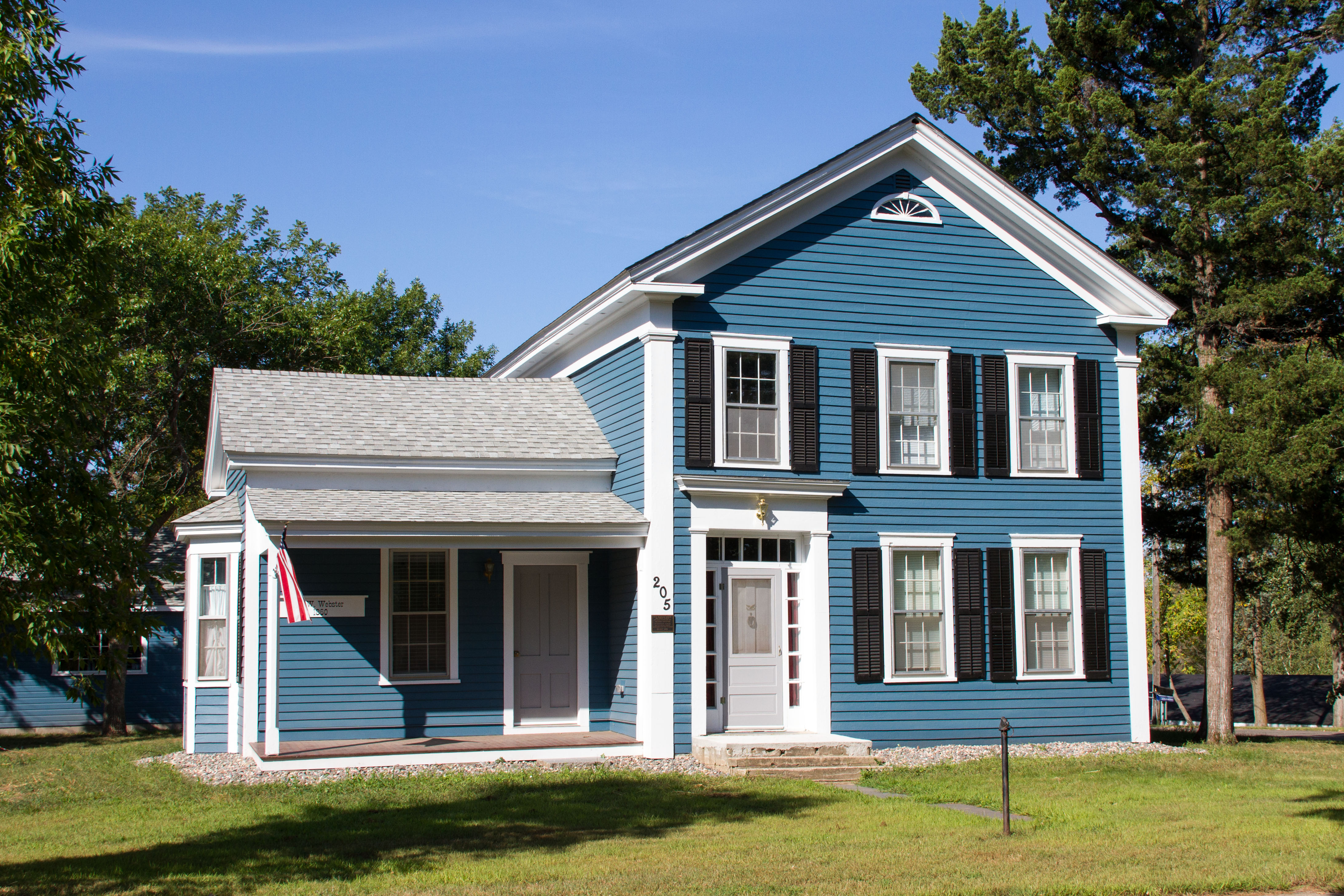
- The William W. Webster House from the east

- Location within Minnesota Location within the United States
- Location: 205 Spring Street, Clearwater, Minnesota
- Coordinates: 45°25′19.5″N 94°3′4.3″W
- Area: Less than one acre
- Built: c. 1863
- Architectural style: Greek Revival
- MPS: Wright County MRA
- NRHP reference No.: 79001261
- Designated NRHP: December 11, 1979

The William W. Webster House is a historic house in Clearwater, Minnesota, United States, built around 1863. It was listed on the National Register of Historic Places in 1979 for having local significance in the themes of architecture and commerce. It was nominated for its Greek Revival architecture, fine craftsmanship, and association with William W. Webster, an early settler and civic leader in Clearwater.

== Description ==
The William W. Webster House is a two-story wood-frame building. A one-and-a-half-story addition to the south dates to the house's original construction or shortly after. A rear addition was added in the early 20th century after Webster's death, along with a detached garage. The main section has a footprint of 23 by 30 feet (7.0 by 9.1 m) while the south wing measures 16 by 14 feet (4.9 by 4.3 m).

== History ==
William W. Webster was a merchant in Sherbrooke, Quebec, Canada, before emigrating to Clearwater, Minnesota, in 1857. He resumed his merchandising trade there. However, when the American Civil War broke out in 1861, Webster enlisted in the 3rd Minnesota Volunteer Infantry Regiment and was elected first lieutenant by his company. He was promoted to major in part due to his actions at the Battle of Murfreesboro. Webster was mustered out in 1864 and returned to his mercantile business in Clearwater. He was also an active organizer in civic affairs. Webster died on November 18, 1895.

== See also ==
- National Register of Historic Places listings in Wright County, Minnesota
