= Clearwater, Minnesota =

City in Minnesota, United States

Clearwater
- City
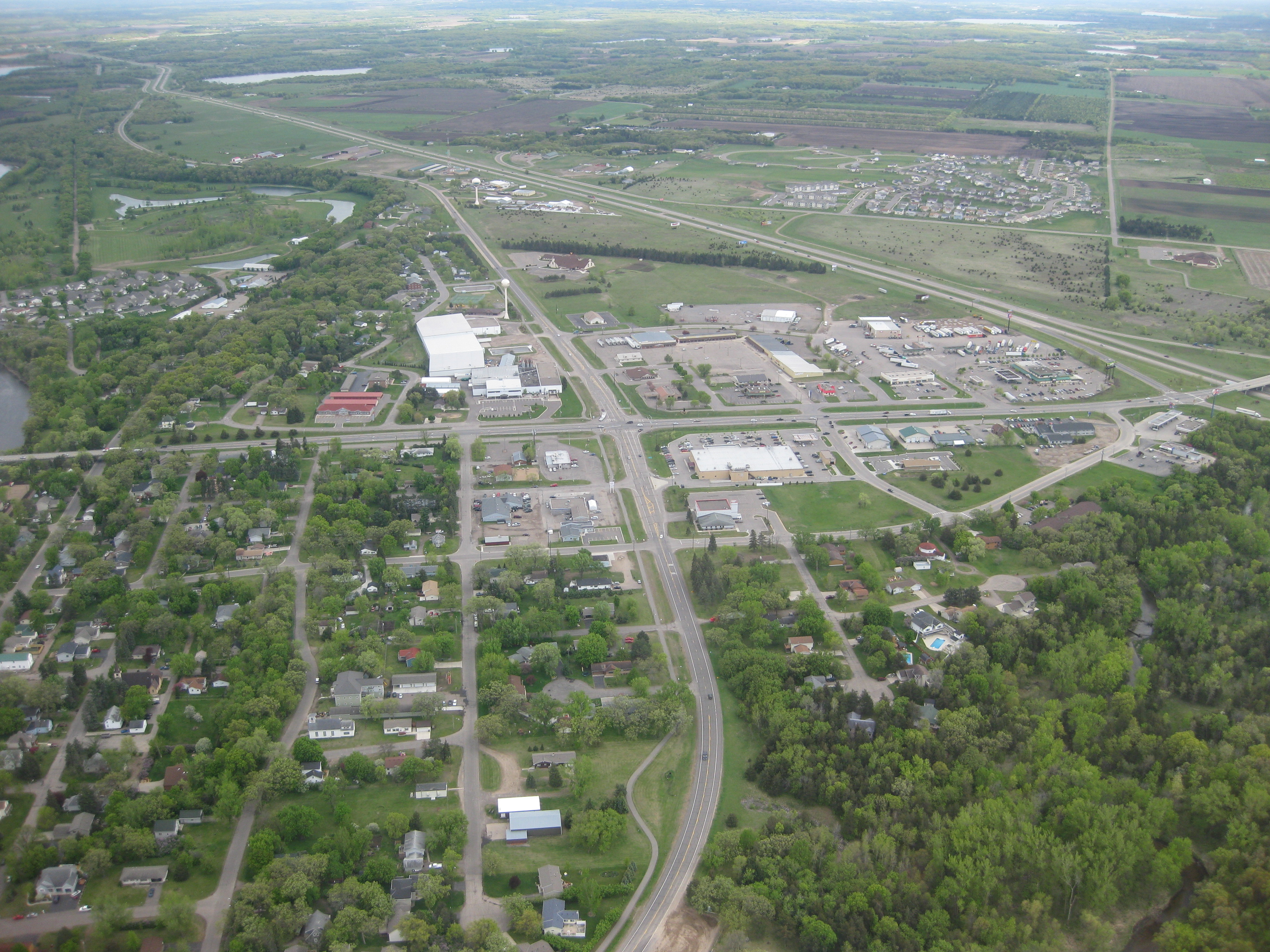

- Location of the city of Clearwater within Wright County, Minnesota
- Coordinates: 45°24′37″N 94°02′41″W
- Country: United States
- State: Minnesota
- Counties: Wright, Stearns

Area
  - Total: 1.71 sq mi (4.42 km^{2})
  - Land: 1.57 sq mi (4.06 km^{2})
  - Water: 0.14 sq mi (0.36 km^{2})
- Elevation: 1,001 ft (305 m)

Population (2020)
  - Total: 1,922
  - Density: 1,227.1/sq mi (473.78/km^{2})
- Time zone: UTC-6 (Central (CST))
  - Summer (DST): UTC-5 (CDT)
- ZIP code: 55320
- Area code: 320
- FIPS code: 27-11800
- GNIS feature ID: 2393554
- Website: https://clearwatercitymn.gov/

Clearwater is a city in Stearns and Wright counties in the U.S. state of Minnesota. The population was 1,922 at the 2020 census. Most of the city lies within Wright County.

The Wright County portion of Clearwater is part of the Minneapolis–St. Paul–WI Metropolitan Statistical Area, while the small portion in Stearns County is part of the St. Cloud Metropolitan Statistical Area.

The city is situated between the Mississippi and Clearwater Rivers. Interstate 94 and Minnesota State Highway 24 are its two main thoroughfares.

Clearwater is 12 miles south of St. Cloud, 16 miles northwest of Monticello, and 25 miles northwest of Buffalo.

== History ==
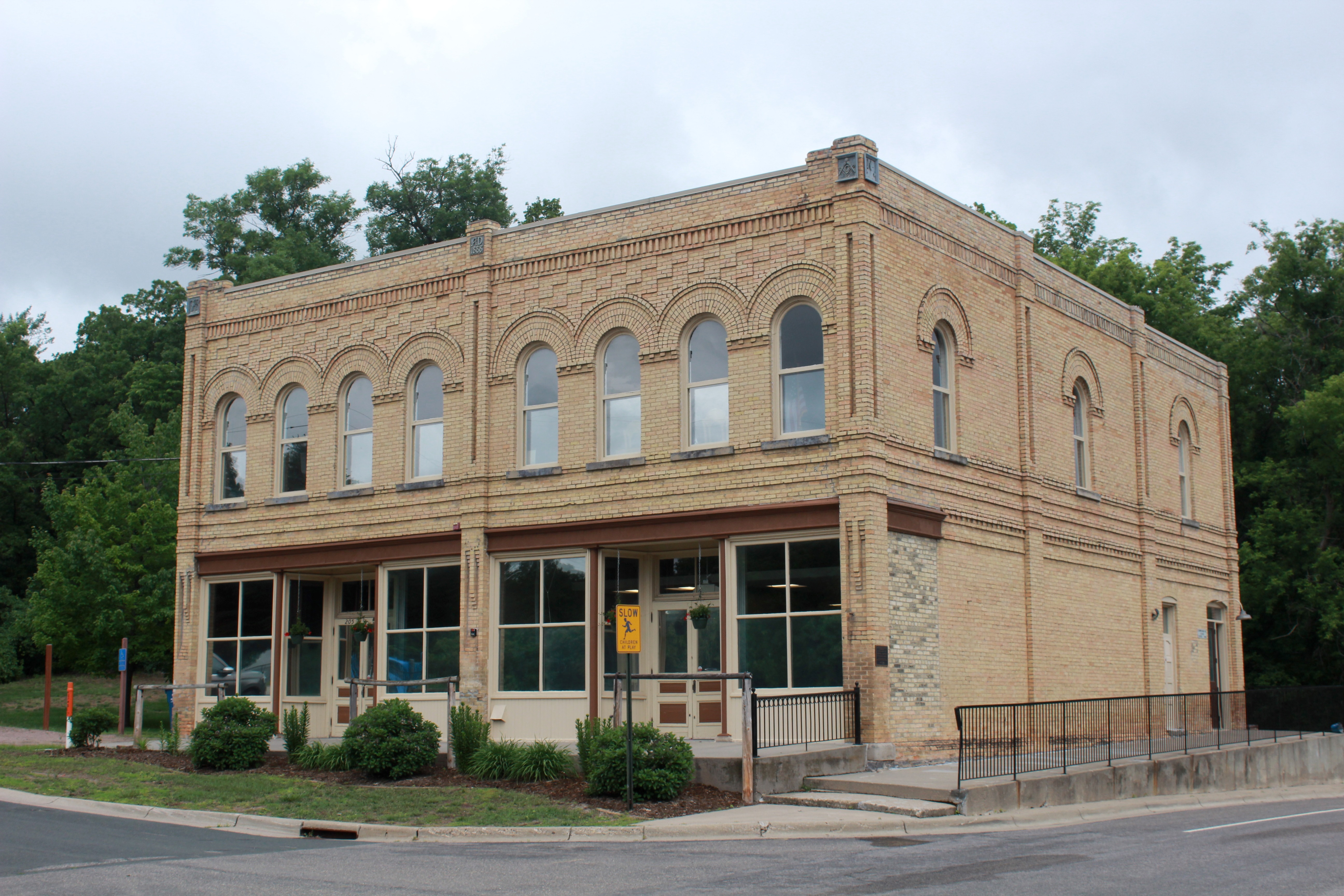
Grand Army of the Republic Hall

Clearwater was platted in 1856, and named after the nearby Clearwater River. A post office has been in operation at Clearwater since 1856. Three properties in Clearwater are listed on the National Register of Historic Places: the 1861 First Congregational Church of Clearwater, the 1863 William W. Webster House, and the 1888 Clearwater Masonic and Grand Army of the Republic Hall.

== Geography ==
According to the United States Census Bureau, the city has a total area of 1.70 square miles (4.40 km^{2}); 1.56 square miles (4.04 km^{2}) is land and 0.14 square miles (0.36 km^{2}) is water.

== Demographics ==
=== 2020 census ===
As of the 2020 census, Clearwater had a population of 1,922.

The median age was 32.5 years. 26.3% of residents were under the age of 18 and 13.1% of residents were 65 years of age or older. For every 100 females there were 97.5 males, and for every 100 females age 18 and over there were 98.3 males age 18 and over.

0.0% of residents lived in urban areas, while 100.0% lived in rural areas.

There were 785 households in Clearwater, of which 33.0% had children under the age of 18 living in them. Of all households, 43.4% were married-couple households, 20.4% were households with a male householder and no spouse or partner present, and 24.3% were households with a female householder and no spouse or partner present. About 27.1% of all households were made up of individuals and 7.0% had someone living alone who was 65 years of age or older.

There were 807 housing units, of which 2.7% were vacant. The homeowner vacancy rate was 0.6% and the rental vacancy rate was 2.0%.

Racial composition as of the 2020 census
Race	Number	Percent
White	1,788	93.0%
Black or African American	22	1.1%
American Indian and Alaska Native	2	0.1%
Asian	9	0.5%
Native Hawaiian and Other Pacific Islander	0	0.0%
Some other race	20	1.0%
Two or more races	81	4.2%
Hispanic or Latino (of any race)	42	2.2%

Historical population
Census	Pop.	Note	%±
1880	218		—
1890	248		13.8%
1900	271		9.3%
1910	311		14.8%
1920	331		6.4%
1930	212		−36.0%
1940	241		13.7%
1950	224		−7.1%
1960	274		22.3%
1970	282		2.9%
1980	379		34.4%
1990	597		57.5%
2000	858		43.7%
2010	1,735		102.2%
2020	1,922		10.8%
U.S. Decennial Census

=== 2010 census ===
As of the census of 2010, there were 1,735 people, 680 households, and 445 families living in the city. The population density was 1,112.2 inhabitants per square mile (429.4/km^{2}). There were 762 housing units at an average density of 488.5 per square mile (188.6/km^{2}). The racial makeup of the city was 96.3% White, 1.3% African American, 0.5% Native American, 0.3% Asian, 0.3% from other races, and 1.2% from two or more races. Hispanic or Latino of any race were 3.2% of the population.

There were 680 households, of which 40.0% had children under the age of 18 living with them, 47.8% were married couples living together, 11.6% had a female householder with no husband present, 6.0% had a male householder with no wife present, and 34.6% were non-families. 24.4% of all households were made up of individuals, and 4.9% had someone living alone who was 65 years of age or older. The average household size was 2.55 and the average family size was 3.04.

The median age in the city was 29.5 years. 28.2% of residents were under the age of 18; 8.7% were between the ages of 18 and 24; 35.7% were from 25 to 44; 17.3% were from 45 to 64; and 10% were 65 years of age or older. The gender makeup of the city was 49.5% male and 50.5% female.

=== 2000 census ===
As of the census of 2000, there were 858 people, 327 households, and 223 families living in the city. The population density was 740.9 inhabitants per square mile (286.1/km^{2}). There were 355 housing units at an average density of 306.5 per square mile (118.3/km^{2}). The racial makeup of the city was 97.79% White, 0.12% African American, 0.58% Native American, 0.35% Asian, 0.58% from other races, and 0.58% from two or more races. Hispanic or Latino of any race were 0.82% of the population.

There were 327 households, out of which 37.0% had children under the age of 18 living with them, 53.5% were married couples living together, 11.0% had a female householder with no husband present, and 31.5% were non-families. 24.2% of all households were made up of individuals, and 8.3% had someone living alone who was 65 years of age or older. The average household size was 2.62 and the average family size was 3.15.

In the city, the population was spread out, with 32.4% under the age of 18, 7.5% from 18 to 24, 32.5% from 25 to 44, 18.6% from 45 to 64, and 9.0% who were 65 years of age or older. The median age was 31 years. For every 100 females, there were 98.2 males. For every 100 females age 18 and over, there were 94.0 males.

The median income for a household in the city was $41,696, and the median income for a family was $46,771. Males had a median income of $36,000 versus $25,341 for females. The per capita income for the city was $17,325. About 6.6% of families and 9.3% of the population were below the poverty line, including 9.6% of those under age 18 and 5.5% of those age 65 or over.

== Education ==
Sections of Clearwater in both counties are in the St. Cloud Area School District. Clearwater is zoned to Clear View Elementary School, South Middle School, and Technical Senior High School.

== Gallery ==
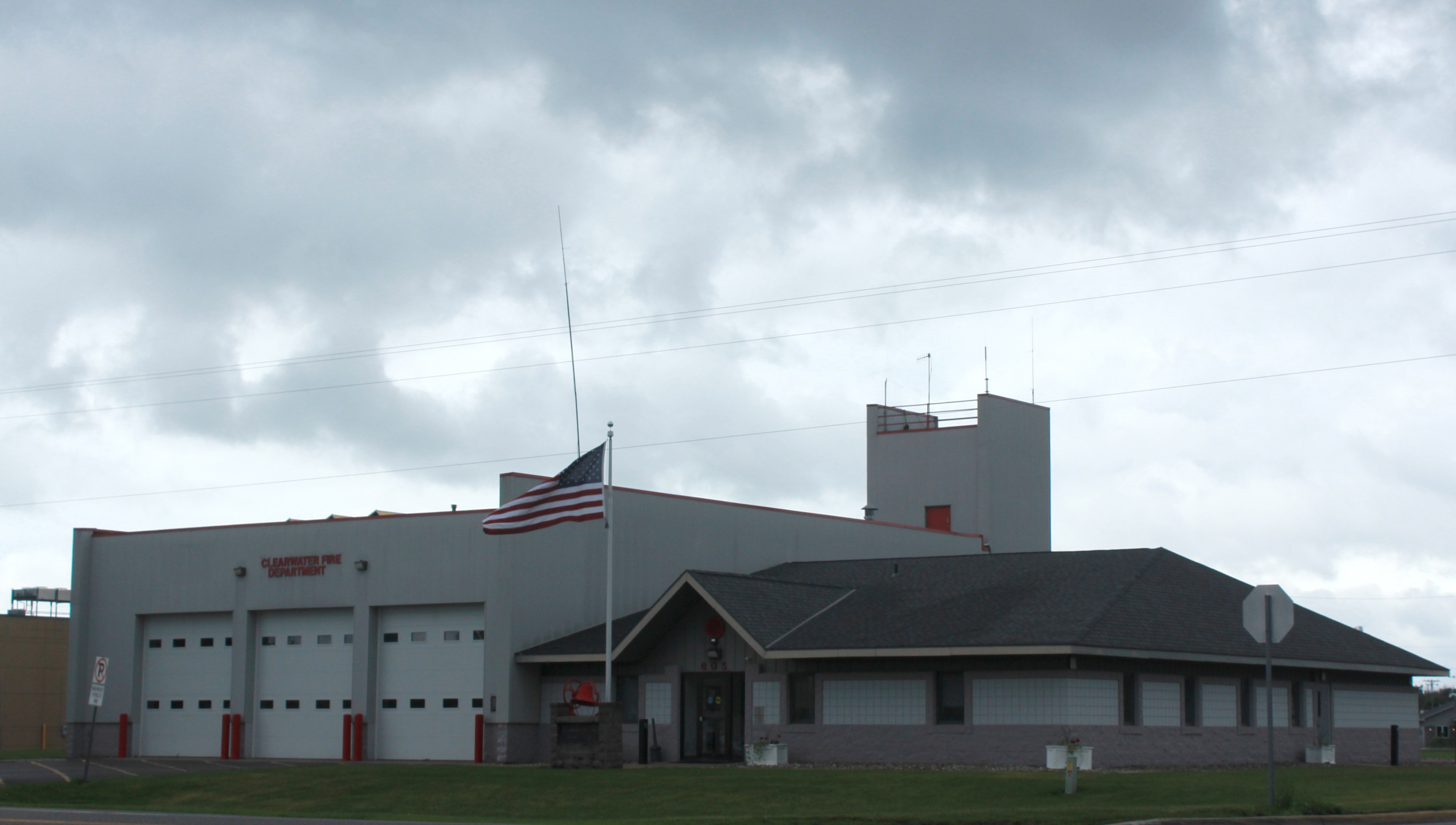
City Hall and Fire Department

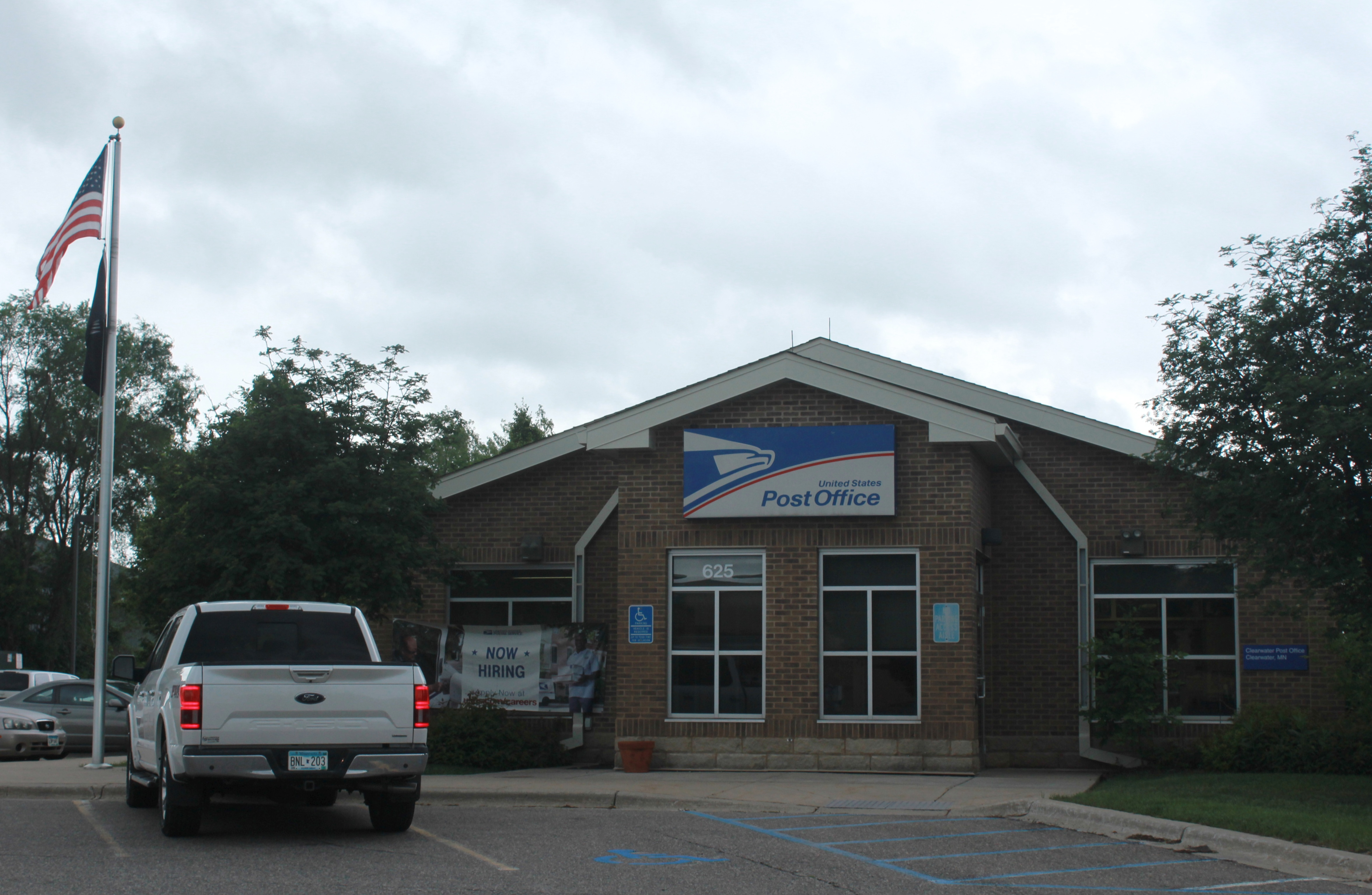
Post Office

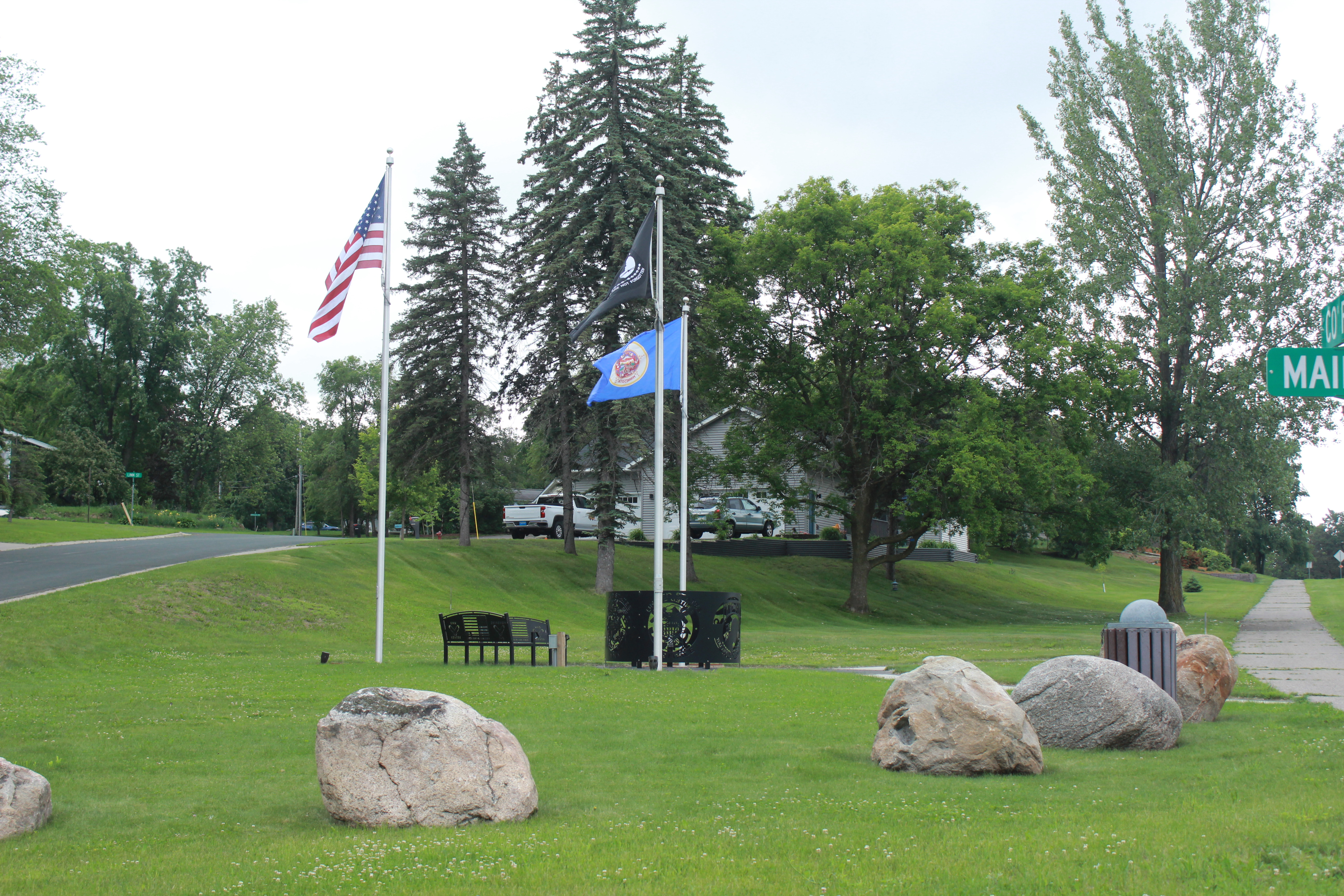
Veterans Memorial Park, Clearwater, Minnesota

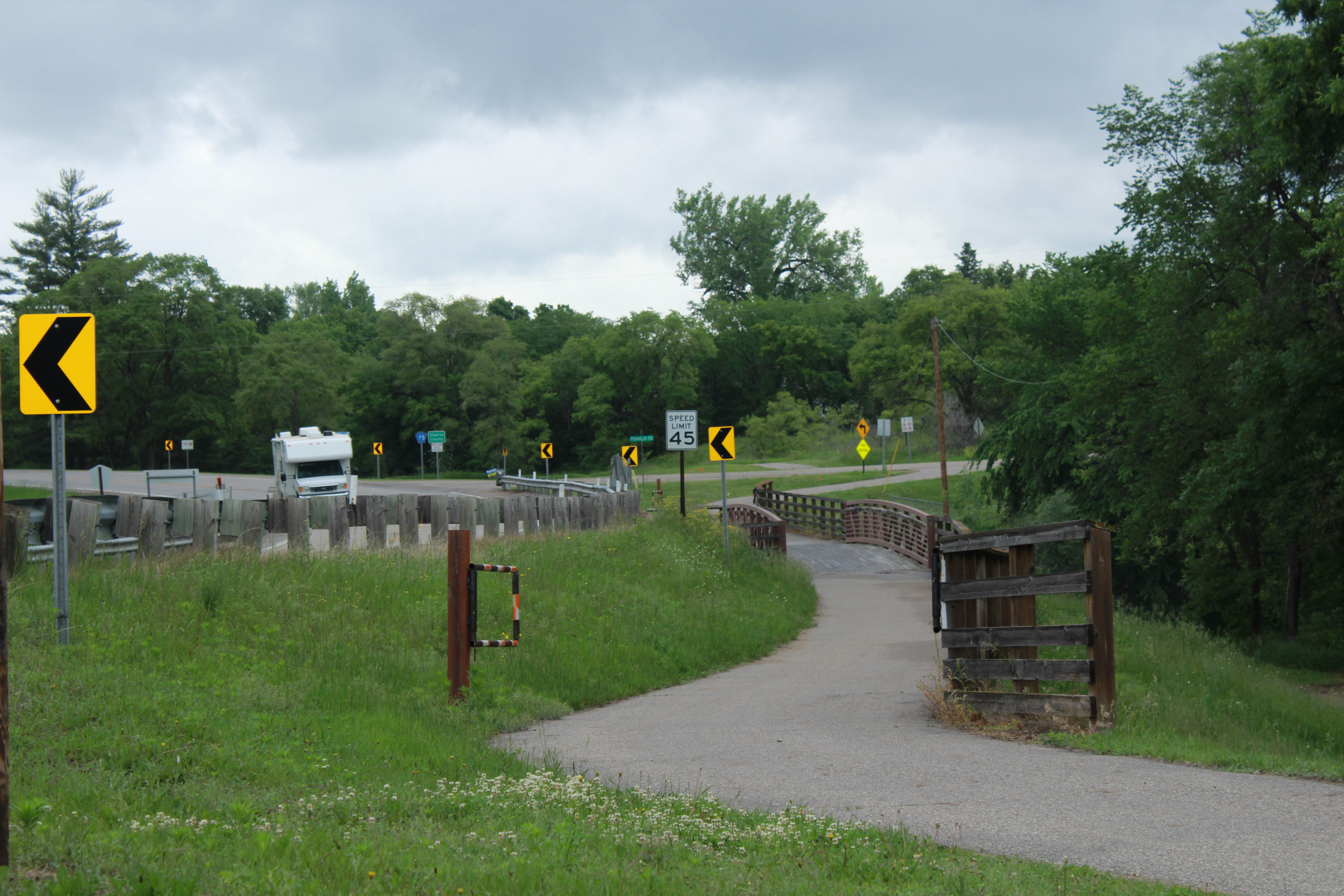
Parkway trail, Clearwater, Minnesota

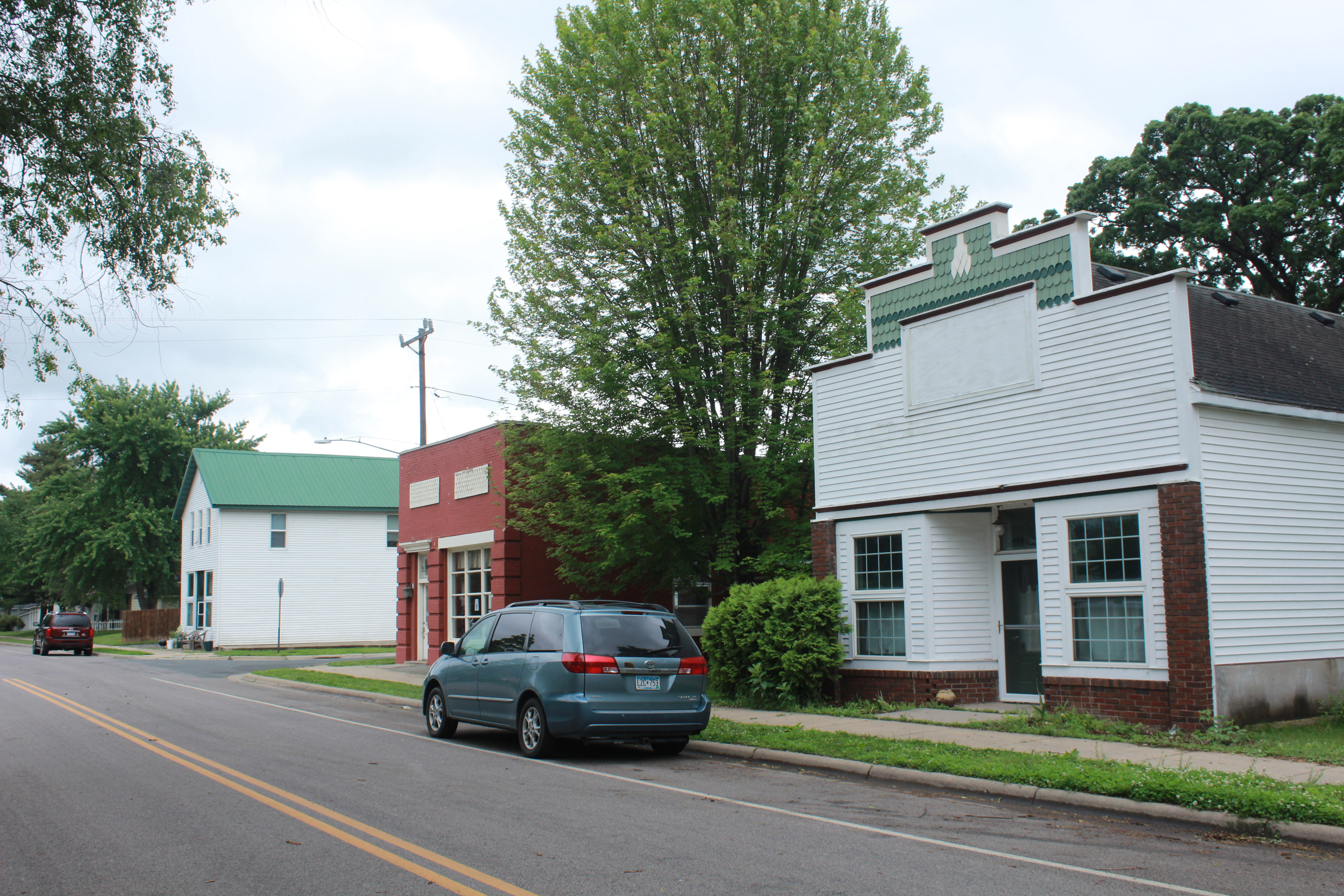
Old commercial buildings at Main and Maple Streets
