= Monticello Township, Wright County, Minnesota =

Monticello Township, Minnesota
- Township
- Location within the state of Minnesota Monticello Township, Minnesota (the United States)
- Coordinates: 45°16′34″N 93°48′17″W
- Country: United States
- State: Minnesota
- County: Wright

Area
  - Total: 43.4 sq mi (112.5 km^{2})
  - Land: 40.1 sq mi (103.9 km^{2})
  - Water: 3.3 sq mi (8.6 km^{2})
- Elevation: 971 ft (296 m)

Population (2000)
  - Total: 4,139
  - Density: 103/sq mi (39.8/km^{2})
- Time zone: UTC-6 (Central (CST))
  - Summer (DST): UTC-5 (CDT)
- Area code: 763
- FIPS code: 27-43792
- GNIS feature ID: 0665015
- Website: https://monticellotownship.net/

Monticello Township is a township in Wright County, Minnesota, United States. The population was 3287 in 2025

Monticello Township was organized in 1858. The David Hanaford Farmstead, with surviving buildings from the 1870s, is on the National Register of Historic Places.

== Geography ==
According to the United States Census Bureau, the township has a total area of 43.5 square miles (113 km^{2}), of which 40.1 square miles (104 km^{2}) is land and 3.3 square miles (8.5 km^{2})) (7.66%) is water.

== Demographics ==
At the 2000 census, there were 4,139 people, 1,318 households and 1,093 families residing in the township. The population density was 103.2 per square mile (39.8/km^{2}). There were 1,357 housing units at an average density of 33.8 per square mile (13.1/km^{2}). The racial make-up of the township was 97.37% White, 0.24% African American, 0.58% Native American, 0.53% Asian, 0.02% Pacific Islander, 0.51% from other races and 0.75% from two or more races. Hispanic or Latino of any race were 1.50% of the population.

There were 1,318 households, of which 46.8% had children under the age of 18 living with them, 71.7% were married couples living together, 7.1% had a female householder with no husband present and 17.0% were non-families. 11.3% of all households were made up of individuals, and 3.1% had someone living alone who was 65 years of age or older. The average household size was 3.10 and the average family size was 3.37.

31.5% of the population were under the age of 18, 8.1% from 18 to 24, 31.4% from 25 to 44, 22.5% from 45 to 64 and 6.5% were 65 years of age or older. The median age was 34 years. For every 100 females, there were 100.9 males. For every 100 females age 18 and over, there were 101.9 males.

The median household income was $57,527 and the median family income was $61,857. Males had a median income of $39,656 and females $26,675. The per capita income was $21,154. About 4.0% of families and 3.6% of the population were below the poverty line, including 4.6% of those under age 18 and 5.5% of those age 65 or over.
