= District No. 48 School (Franklin Township, Minnesota) =

- U.S. National Register of Historic Places
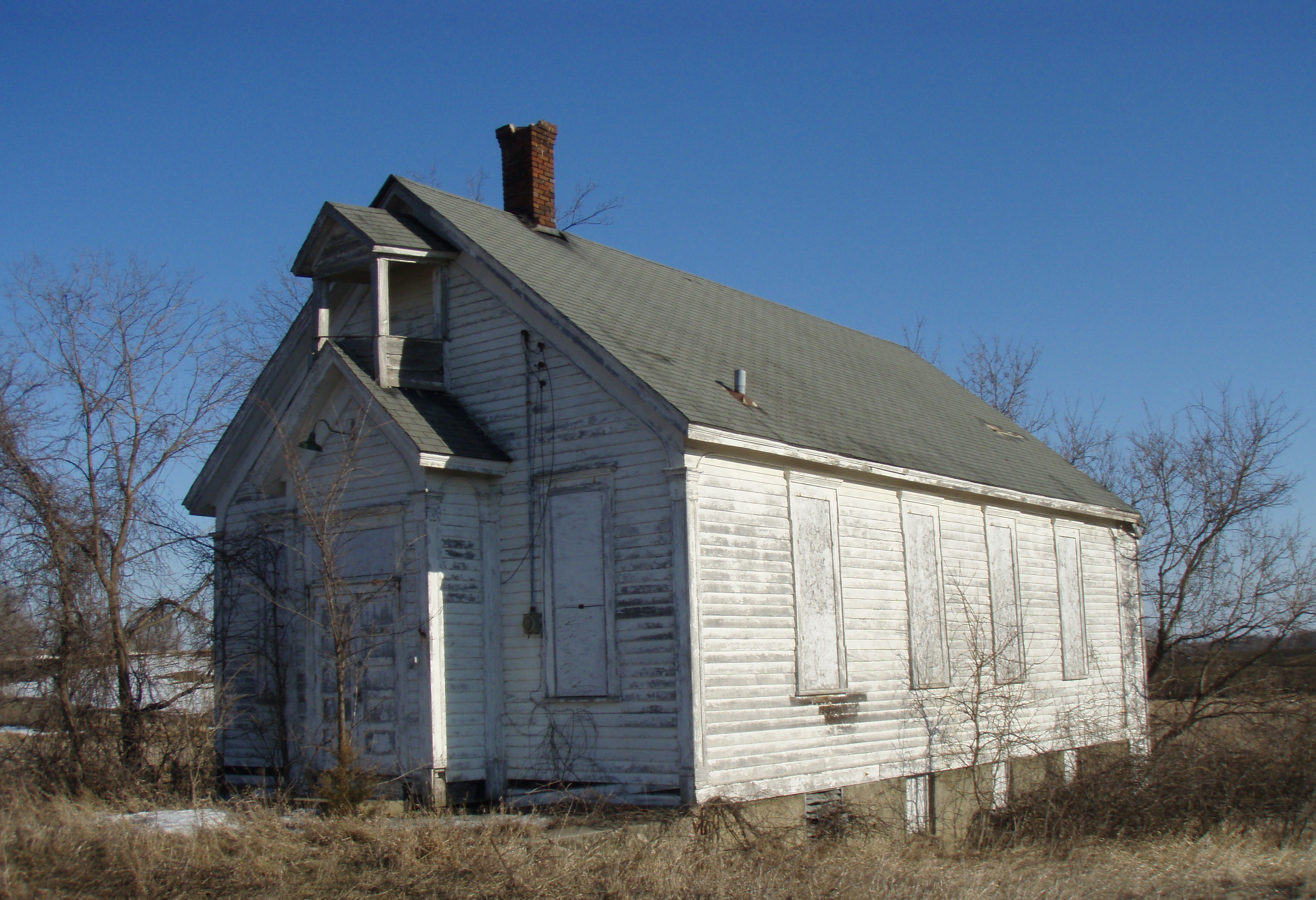
- District No. 48 School from the northwest

- Location within Minnesota Location within the United States
- Location: U.S. Route 12, Franklin Township, Minnesota
- Nearest city: Delano, Minnesota
- Coordinates: 45°3′52.3″N 93°49′31.7″W
- Area: Less than one acre
- Built: 1871
- MPS: Wright County MRA
- NRHP reference No.: 79001267
- Designated NRHP: December 11, 1979

District No. 48 School, later Franklin Township Hall, is a historic one-room school in Franklin Township, Minnesota, United States, built in 1871. It was listed on the National Register of Historic Places in 1979 for having local significance in the themes of architecture and education. It was nominated as an example of the early schoolhouses built throughout rural Wright County in the late 19th century. It is now vacant.

== Description ==
District No. 48 School is a simple wood-frame building with clapboard siding. It has a rectangular footprint with a small vestibule at the main entrance topped with a little belfry. Sited on a hill, the building consists of one story over a walk-out basement. Ornamentation is limited to Doric pilasters, fascia boards, and flared window jambs.

== History ==
The first schools in Wright County were held in rough log cabins or private homes. District No. 48 School was built in 1871, part of a wave of school construction to replace the earlier structures as settlement increased and communities were established. Wright County peaked at having 140 schoolhouses divided into 19 school districts.

In the 20th century Wright County's numerous schools were consolidated into fewer, larger schools situated in cities and towns. This was a factor of decreasing rural populations, changing educational requirements at the state level, and higher standards for school facilities. The District No. 48 schoolhouse became the meeting hall for Franklin Township. At the time of its nomination to the National Register in 1979 the building was still in use as a township hall and "in an excellent state of maintenance and preservation". Township functions have since been relocated, and the building has stood vacant for several years.

== See also ==
- National Register of Historic Places listings in Wright County, Minnesota
