= Tom Emmer =

American politician (born 1961)

- Official portrait, 2017

House Minority Whip-designate
- Assuming office January 3, 2027
- Leader: Jim Jordan (designate)
- Succeeding: Katherine Clark

House Majority Whip
- Incumbent
- Assumed office January 3, 2023
- Speaker: Kevin McCarthy; Mike Johnson
- Preceded by: Jim Clyburn

Chair of the National Republican Congressional Committee
- In office January 3, 2019 – January 3, 2023
- Leader: Kevin McCarthy
- Preceded by: Steve Stivers
- Succeeded by: Richard Hudson

Member of the U.S. House of Representatives from Minnesota's 6th district
- Incumbent
- Assumed office January 3, 2015
- Preceded by: Michele Bachmann

Member of the Minnesota House of Representatives from the 19B district
- In office January 4, 2005 – January 3, 2011
- Preceded by: Dick Borrell
- Succeeded by: Joe McDonald

Personal details
- Born: Thomas Earl Emmer Jr. March 3, 1961 (age 65) South Bend, Indiana, U.S.
- Party: Republican
- Spouse: Jacqueline Samuel (m. 1986)
- Children: 7
- Education: Boston University (attended); University of Alaska, Fairbanks (BA); William Mitchell College of Law (JD)
- Website: House website Campaign website
- Emmer's voice Emmer supporting the Financial CHOICE Act, legislation to replace portions of the Dodd-Frank Act. Recorded June 8, 2017

Thomas Earl Emmer Jr. (born March 3, 1961) is an American attorney, lobbyist, and politician serving since 2023 as majority whip in the United States House of Representatives. A member of the Republican Party, he has represented Minnesota's 6th congressional district since 2015. During his tenure in Congress, he has been known as a strong advocate for the crypto industry.

Before his election to Congress, Emmer served three terms as a member of the Minnesota House of Representatives from 2005 to 2011. He lost the 2010 Minnesota gubernatorial election to Minnesota Democratic–Farmer–Labor Party nominee Mark Dayton by less than half a percentage point. Emmer was elected to Congress in 2014, winning the 6th district seat being vacated by Michele Bachmann. He has been reelected five times. The district includes the far western and northern suburbs of Minneapolis in the Twin Cities metropolitan area, most of the St. Cloud metropolitan area, and a large part of rural Central Minnesota, generally an agricultural region.

Emmer chaired the National Republican Congressional Committee from 2019 to 2023. After Republicans gained a narrow-than-expected majority in the 2022 U.S. House of Representatives elections, he won a contested election for majority whip, 115–106.

Emmer initially cast doubt on the 2020 U.S. presidential election results, saying that certain states used "questionable" practices in administering the vote. After signing an amicus brief in support of Texas v. Pennsylvania, a lawsuit seeking to contest the outcome in key swing states, Emmer ultimately voted to certify the Electoral College vote count.

Emmer was the House Republican Conference's third nominee in the October 2023 Speaker of the House election, after Steve Scalise withdrew and Jim Jordan failed to garner the votes needed in the first three ballots. He withdrew from the race shortly after former president Donald Trump voiced his opposition, calling him "totally out-of-touch with Republican Voters" and a "Globalist RINO".

== Early life and education ==
Emmer was born in South Bend, Indiana. His family later moved to Edina, Minnesota. He attended St. Thomas Academy, an all-male, Catholic, military, college-preparatory high school in Mendota Heights, near Saint Paul.

Emmer attended Boston College and the University of Alaska Fairbanks, graduating from the latter in 1984 with a Bachelor of Arts in political science. He played hockey for both schools. In 1988, Emmer received a Juris Doctor from William Mitchell College of Law in Saint Paul, Minnesota.

== Career ==
Emmer began his legal career representing cities and counties through the League of Minnesota Cities Insurance Trust and the League of Minnesota Counties Insurance Trust, handling lawsuits against police officers. He also represented volunteer firefighters and city and county inspectors, and handled a variety of land use issues. He was licensed to practice law in Minnesota, North Dakota, and Wisconsin.

Emmer served on city councils in Independence, Minnesota, and then in Delano, Minnesota.

=== Minnesota House of Representatives ===
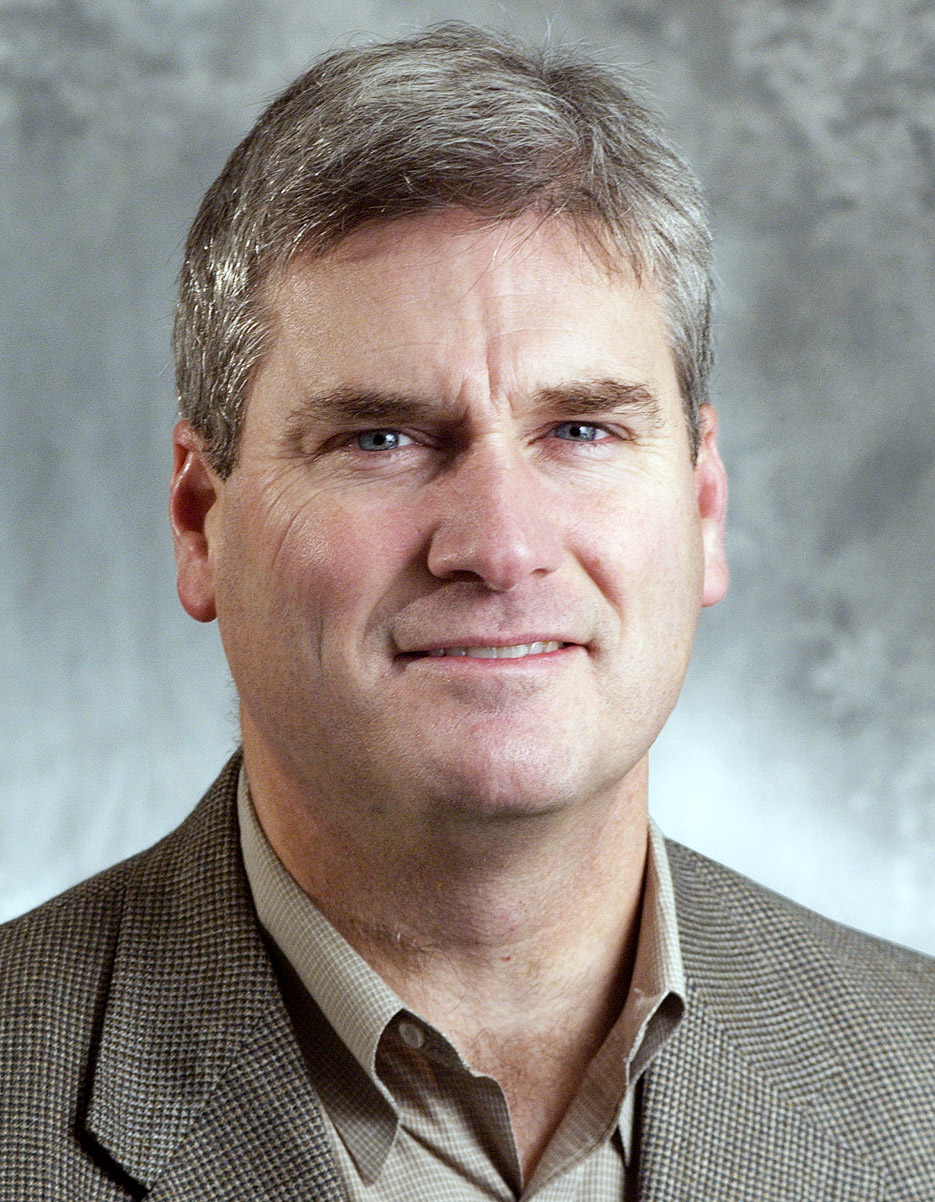
Emmer during his tenure as a state representative, 2004

In 2004, incumbent Republican state representative Dick Borrell of Minnesota's House District 19B decided to retire. District 19B included portions of Wright and Hennepin Counties and the cities of Otsego, Albertville, St. Michael, Rockford, Delano, Montrose, and Waverly. Emmer, the Republican candidate, defeated Democrat Lori M. Schmidt, an attorney, 60%–40%, in the November 2004 general election.

In 2006, Emmer won reelection to a second term with 61% of the vote. In 2008, he was reelected to a third term with 61% of the vote. In 2010, he chose to run for governor of Minnesota rather than seek reelection.

During legislative sessions, Emmer regularly rode the bus to the Minnesota State Capitol. Emmer served on the Finance Committee, the Health Care and Human Services Policy and Oversight Committee, and the State and Local Government Operations Reform, Technology and Elections Committee. He was also a member of the Finance Subcommittee for the Health Care and Human Services Finance Division, and of the Health Care and Human Services Policy and Oversight Subcommittee for the Licensing Division.

=== 2010 gubernatorial election ===
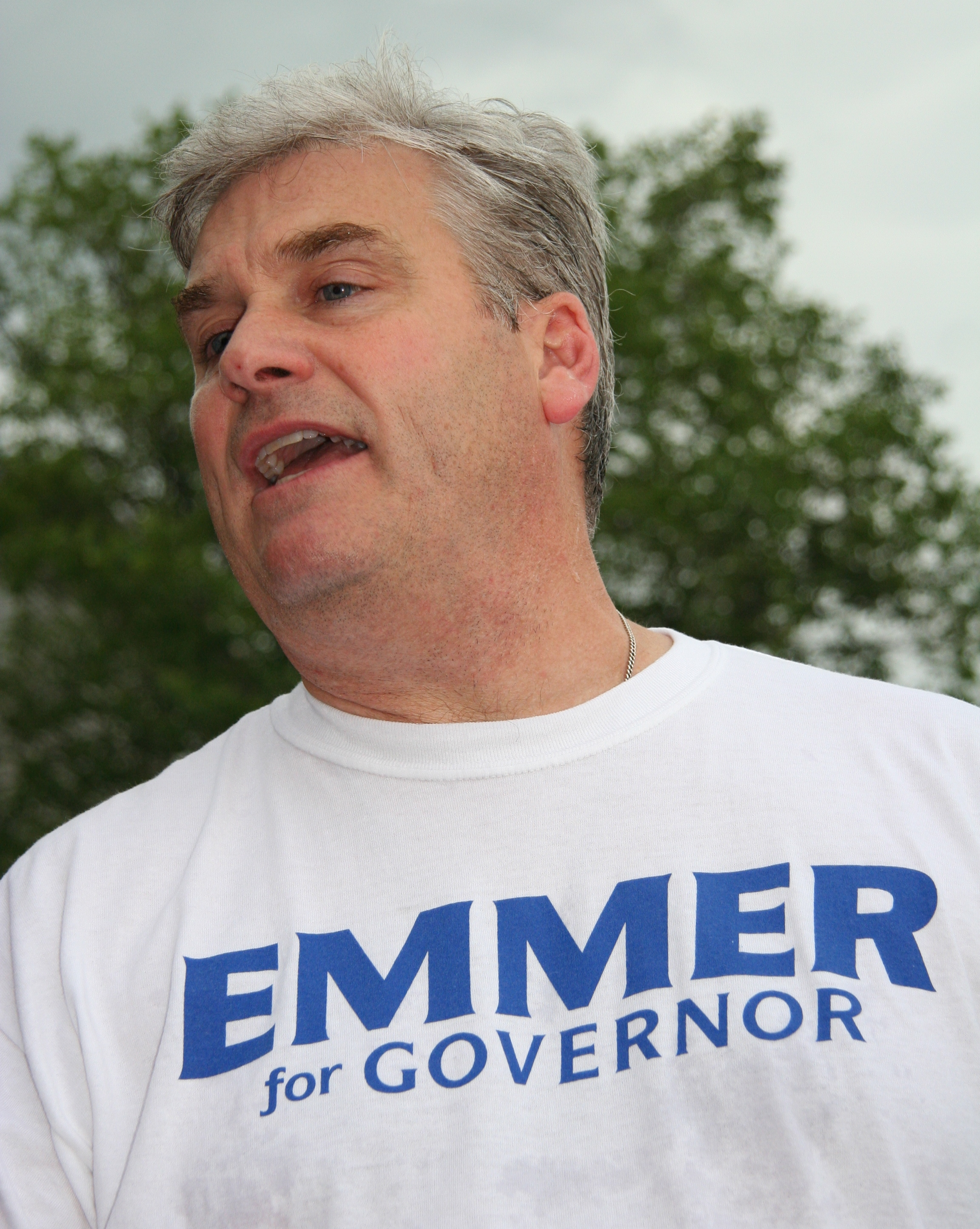
Candidate Tom Emmer wearing an "Emmer for Governor" shirt in 2010

Emmer announced his candidacy for governor of Minnesota in July 2009. In January 2010, Emmer came in second to Marty Seifert in a non-binding straw poll of Republican Party caucus participants. In April 2010, Emmer announced that his running mate would be Metropolitan Council member Annette Meeks. Emmer was endorsed by former Alaska governor Sarah Palin, Governor Tim Pawlenty, and Lieutenant Governor Carol Molnau. On April 30, 2010, the Republican Party of Minnesota endorsed Emmer as its nominee for governor at the state convention in Minneapolis. His main opponent, Marty Seifert, withdrew from the race and endorsed Emmer when it became apparent that Emmer was nearing the threshold for party endorsement. On August 10, Emmer won the Republican primary with 82% of the vote, a 75-point margin over Bob Carney.

The race attracted national attention as the "first case in this election cycle of a company hit by national protests over a campaign donation". Minnesota-based Target Corporation donated $150,000 to Minnesota Forward, a new political action committee paying for advertising that supported Emmer's gubernatorial election. Emmer said he viewed Target's donation as an exercise in free speech and wanted to keep his campaign focused on economic issues. Best Buy also donated $100,000 to Minnesota Forward.

The general election was contested by Emmer, former U.S. senator Mark Dayton (DFL), and Independence Party candidate Tom Horner. Emmer trailed Dayton by 9,000 votes in the general election results, a margin small enough to trigger an automatic recount. Most analysts felt it was unlikely that the Emmer campaign could overcome such a deficit in a recount. After the recount made little difference, Emmer conceded the election on December 8, 2010.

=== Post-2010 election activities ===
Emmer was a registered lobbyist in Minnesota, and co-hosted a morning talk radio program with Bob Davis on KTLK in Minneapolis.

In early 2011, he ran for an open Minnesota seat on the Republican National Committee, but lost that election to Hennepin County commissioner Jeff Johnson.

Emmer hosted a 2011 event promoting the launch of Representative Ron Paul's presidential campaign in Minnesota.

In June 2015, Emmer and Representative Keith Ellison announced the formation of the bipartisan Congressional Somalia Caucus. The caucus was created to focus on U.S. policy toward Somalia, including issues related to political stability, governance, economic development, and national security. The caucus was intended to address Somalia's ongoing recovery from decades of conflict while also reflecting the domestic importance of U.S.–Somalia relations to Somali-American communities in Minnesota. Emmer and Ellison said the caucus would support efforts to strengthen democratic institutions, improve economic conditions, and counter extremist groups such as al-Shabaab, with the broader goal of promoting long-term stability and cooperation between the U.S. and Somalia.

== U.S. House of Representatives ==
=== Elections ===
==== 2014 ====
Upon the surprise retirement of U.S. representative Michele Bachmann, announced in May 2013, Emmer was considered a possible candidate for the Sixth Congressional District seat; his state house district included a large slice of the congressional district's western portion. On June 5, 2013, Emmer officially announced he would seek the Republican nomination for the seat. On February 4, 2014, Emmer received 67.9% of the vote in a 6th district straw poll. On April 12 he received the Republican Party endorsement for the nomination on the first ballot with 76%, but he still faced a primary challenge from his two competitors, Anoka County Board chairwoman Rhonda Sivarajah and former state representative Phil Krinkie. Emmer was endorsed by the Tea Party Express, Young Americans for Liberty's Liberty Action Fund, and many Minnesota legislators. He won the primary with 73% of the vote, and easily prevailed in the November general election.

2014 Republican primary results
Party	Candidate	Votes	%
Republican	Tom Emmer	19,557	73.3
Republican	Rhonda Sivarajah	7,125	26.7
Total votes		26,682	100.0

Minnesota's 6th congressional district, 2014
Party	Candidate	Votes	%
Republican	Tom Emmer	133,328	56.3
Democratic (DFL)	Joe Perske	90,926	38.4
Independence	John Denney	12,457	5.2
Write-in		135	0.1
Total votes		236,846	100.0
Republican hold			

==== 2016 ====
In 2016 Emmer defeated Democratic nominee David Snyder, 66% to 34%.

2016 Republican primary results
Party	Candidate	Votes	%
Republican	Tom Emmer (incumbent)	13,590	68.7
Republican	A. J. Kern	5,219	26.4
Republican	Patrick Munro	962	4.9
Total votes		19,771	100.0

Minnesota's 6th congressional district election, 2016
Party	Candidate	Votes	%
Republican	Tom Emmer (incumbent)	235,380	65.6
Democratic (DFL)	David Snyder	123,008	34.3
Write-in		536	0.1
Total votes		358,924	100.0
Republican hold			

==== 2018 ====
In 2018 Emmer defeated Democratic nominee Ian Todd, 61% to 39%.

2018 Republican primary results
Party	Candidate	Votes	%
Republican	Tom Emmer (incumbent)	34,251	76.6
Republican	A.J. Kern	7,897	17.7
Republican	Patrick Munro	2,575	5.8
Total votes		44,723	100.0

Minnesota's 6th congressional district, 2018
Party	Candidate	Votes	%
Republican	Tom Emmer (incumbent)	192,936	61.1
Democratic (DFL)	Ian Todd	122,330	38.7
Write-in		463	0.2
Total votes		315,729	100.0
Republican hold			

==== 2020 ====
In 2020 Emmer defeated Democratic nominee Tawnja Zahradka 66% to 34%.

2020 Republican primary results
Party	Candidate	Votes	%
Republican	Tom Emmer (incumbent)	30,654	87.2
Republican	Patrick Munro	4,518	12.8
Total votes		35,172	100.0

Minnesota's 6th congressional district, 2020
Party	Candidate	Votes	%
Republican	Tom Emmer (incumbent)	270,901	65.7
Democratic (DFL)	Tawnja Zahradka	140,853	34.2
Write-in		553	0.1
Total votes		412,307	100.0
Republican hold			

==== 2022 ====
In 2022 Emmer defeated Democratic nominee Jeanne Hendricks, 62% to 37%.

Minnesota's 6th congressional district, 2022
Party	Candidate	Votes	%
Republican	Tom Emmer (incumbent)	198,145	62.0
Democratic (DFL)	Jeanne Hendricks	120,852	37.8
Write-in		770	0.2
Total votes		319,767	100.0
Republican hold			

==== 2024 ====
In 2024 Emmer defeated Democratic nominee Jeanne Hendricks, 62% to 37%.

Minnesota's 6th congressional district, 2024
Party	Candidate	Votes	%
Republican	Tom Emmer (incumbent)	260,095	62.5
Democratic (DFL)	Jeanne Hendricks	155,836	37.4
Write-in		565	0.1
Total votes		416,496	100.0
Republican hold			

=== Tenure ===
According to the McCourt School of Public Policy at Georgetown University, Emmer held a Bipartisan Index Score of -0.0 in the 116th United States Congress for 2019, which placed him 192nd out of 435 members. Based on FiveThirtyEight's congressional vote tracker at ABC News, Emmer voted with Donald Trump's stated public policy positions 91.5% of the time, which ranked him average in the 116th United States Congress when predictive scoring (district partisanship and voting record) is used.

In 2019, Emmer sent a fundraising letter that critics alleged included antisemitic canards. The letter claimed that "left-wing radicals essentially BOUGHT control of Congress for the Democrats" and that three Jewish billionaires (Michael Bloomberg, Tom Steyer and George Soros) "bought" control of Congress for Democrats.

In October 2020, after it was determined that Emmer had interacted with individuals who tested positive for coronavirus in Washington, D.C., such as Donald Trump, Emmer flew on a Delta flight in violation of the airline's rules, potentially exposing the other passengers to the virus.

After the 2020 presidential election, Emmer said there were "questionable" practices in the election process, without going into specifics. He subsequently co-signed an amicus brief in support of a lawsuit filed in Texas that sought to annul the results in various swing states. Eventually, Emmer voted in favor of certifying the results of the election. On May 19, 2021, Emmer and other seven Republican House leaders voted against establishing a national commission to investigate the January 6, 2021, attack on the United States Capitol Complex. Thirty-five House Republicans and all 217 Democrats present voted to establish such a commission.

In August 2021, Emmer released a statement about the resignation of Minnesota Republican Party chair Jennifer Carnahan after her ties with donor, strategist, and convicted sex trafficker Anton Lazzaro became a national news story. Emmer had previously received a $15,600 donation from Lazzaro, which Emmer then said he would donate to charity.

==== House Majority Whip (2023-2027) ====
On November 15, 2022, after Republicans gained the House majority, Emmer was elected Majority Whip. He won what was reportedly the conference's closest race, beating Drew Ferguson on the first ballot and Jim Banks on the second by a 115–106 vote.

==== October 2023 Speaker election ====
On October 20, 2023, it was reported that Emmer was considering a bid for Speaker of the House and making calls to gather support. He has been endorsed by former speaker Kevin McCarthy, who said, "He is the right person for the job. He can unite the conference. He understands the dynamics of the conference. He also understands what it takes to win and keep a majority." On October 24, the Republican conference nominated Emmer for the speaker candidateship, but he dropped out the same day following opposition from hardliners and former president Donald Trump. He was replaced by Mike Johnson, who later won the speakership.

November 2025 Emmer voted in favor of H.R. 4405, the Epstein Files Transparency Act. After the vote, he said the House Republicans called for "transparency and accountability" about Jeffrey Epstein.

September 2026 Emmer has not signed the 2026 discharge petition for H.R. 9694 (Epstein Files Transparency Act II), as of September 18, 2026.

==== House Minority Whip (2027-present) ====
After the Republicans lost control of the House in the 2026 midterms, Emmer was elected Minority Whip, defeating August Pfluger in a vote of the much-reduced Republican caucus. As Majority Whip, Emmer was the third-ranking House Republican behind Speakers McCarthy and Johnson and Majority Whip Scalise. As Minority Whip, he will be second in command to Minority Leader Jim Jordan.

=== Committee assignments ===
For the 119th Congress:

- Committee on Financial Services
  - Subcommittee on Digital Assets, Financial Technology and Inclusion

=== Caucus memberships ===
- Republican Main Street Partnership
- Republican Study Committee
- Congressional Coalition on Adoption
- Congressional Caucus on Turkey and Turkish Americans
- Rare Disease Caucus
- Congressional Western Caucus
- Sharia-Free America Caucus

== Political positions ==
=== Abortion ===
Emmer is anti-abortion. He has an A+ rating from Susan B. Anthony Pro-Life America, and opposes the use of taxpayer dollars for abortion purposes.

=== BPA ===
In 2009, Emmer voted against legislation to prohibit sales of any children's product containing Bisphenol-A (except for used children's products). He said he voted against the law because of fear of "increased costs".

=== Bullying ===
During an October 9, 2010, televised debate, Emmer said he would oppose legislation to combat school bullying against gay and lesbian young people. He voted against anti-bullying legislation as a state lawmaker and said that teachers are most responsible for halting bullies, but suggested that the threat of lawsuits keeps them from doing so. "I don't think we need more laws; I think we need more understanding," he said.

=== Moment of silence for Derek Chauvin ===
Emmer defended Minnesota Republicans who held a moment of silence at their June 2026 convention for Derek Chauvin, the former Minneapolis police officer who murdered George Floyd. "It's a sad day in the State of Minnesota when it's so-called news that hundreds of patriotic Minnesotans came together to peacefully and respectfully recognize a member of law enforcement", Emmer said in a statement provided to the local Fox television outlet.

=== Climate and environment ===
As a state representative, in 2007 Emmer called climate science "Al Gore's climate porn", referring to Gore's documentary An Inconvenient Truth.

Emmer co-sponsored a 2022 nonbinding resolution in support of domestic oil and gas production, which did not pass. The proposal urged the House to "support the safe and responsible development of its energy resources via drilling".

The environmental advocacy League of Conservation Voters has given Emmer a lifetime score of 5%, the lowest in Minnesota's congressional delegation. Recent votes improved his 2021 score to 21%, compared to the U.S. House average of 57%.

=== Copper nickel mining in northern Minnesota ===
In 2018, Emmer supported two copper nickel mines in the Superior National Forest. As of 2019, they were planned by Polymet, which is owned by Switzerland-based mining giant Glencore, and Twin Metals, which is owned by Antofagasta, a Chilean mining company controlled by the Luksics, one of Chile's wealthiest families.

When the Department of Interior did not list copper or nickel as two of 35 "critical minerals" essential to national security in 2018, Emmer released a press release of a letter he wrote to Department of Interior Secretary Ryan Zinke requesting that copper and nickel be included.

Emmer and Representative Pete Stauber both stood beside Assistant Secretary of the Interior Joseph Balash as he signed leases permitting Twin Metals to explore a large area of national forest land nine miles southeast of Ely for copper-nickel reserves on May 15, 2019. The Obama administration had mothballed the lease renewal pending an environmental review, but Twin Metals is now in possession of a 10-year lease to explore the area, with a view toward opening a mine there.

=== Cryptocurrency and digital assets ===
Tom Emmer is an outspoken proponent of cryptocurrency and digital assets. In 2023, Politico called him "Capitol Hill's top crypto advocate for years, championing the industry well before most members of Congress took it seriously." He has persistently fought federal regulation of the crypto industry. Emmer raised the second-most cash from the crypto industry of all members of Congress in the 2022 election cycle.

In June 2023, Emmer cosponsored the SEC Stabilization Act, which would effectively fire U.S. Securities and Exchange Commission chairman Gary Gensler. The legislation was not considered likely to win Congressional approval. It was introduced a week after the SEC sued Coinbase and Binance, claiming they failed to register as a national securities exchange, broker, and clearing agency.

After endorsing Donald Trump for president in 2024, Emmer said, "If the second Trump administration takes place, [the] president will be a lot more friendly to the crypto industry". Industry advocates say their efforts to develop regulations are nonpartisan.

=== Defunding the Consumer Financial Protection Bureau ===
In November 2023, Emmer voted in favor of an amendment to a funding bill that would eliminate funding for the Consumer Financial Protection Bureau.

=== Drunk driving ===
In 2009, Emmer sponsored a bill that would shorten the period of license revocation for driving under the influence and for refusing to take a field sobriety test. Additionally, though "suspected drunken drivers [currently] face revocation before they go to court," Emmer's bill would have delayed revocations until after conviction. Supporters of Emmer's bill said "it's needed because pre-conviction revocations penalize drivers before proving they're guilty." Mothers Against Drunk Driving and the head of the Minnesota DWI task force opposed the legislation because it would allow arrested drivers to continue to drive during the time between their arrest and hearing.

Emmer's own history became an issue in relation to his bill. At age 20, Emmer received a driving under the influence-related ticket. In 1991, at age 30, he pleaded guilty to careless driving while two charges for DWI and a license-plate violation were dropped. Emmer denied that his own drunk driving and legal consequences played a part in the bill, stating, "We all come to the Legislature with life experiences, but it has nothing to do with this bill." Emmer also said that his sentence in 1981 should have been harsher, because in that case he "probably wouldn't have taken the second chance" that led to his subsequent arrests and guilty plea in 1991.

On May 13, 2010, Emmer was one of three legislators not to vote on a bill that would have provided such tougher penalties for drunk drivers. He said he missed the vote when a previously scheduled lunch ran long, and that he had "no idea" how he would have voted on the bill, but that he "assume[d]" he would have supported it.

=== "Fire Pelosi" machine gun video ===
In an October 2022 CBS News television interview, Emmer was challenged for posting a video on Twitter that showed him firing a fully automatic machine gun, in bursts of two to three bullets, with the caption "#FIREPELOSI". As chair of the National Republican Congressional Committee (NRCC), Emmer led 2022 election efforts to win a majority and replace House speaker Nancy Pelosi. The post occurred just days before the home invasion and attack on Pelosi's husband in California.

=== Healthcare ===
Emmer favors repealing the Affordable Care Act (Obamacare). After supporting the March 2017 version of the American Health Care Act (a bill to repeal the ACA), he voted for it on May 4, 2017, before it had been scored by the Congressional Budget Office to determine its economic impact.

=== Minimum wage ===
In 2005, as a state representative, Emmer introduced an amendment that would have eliminated Minnesota's minimum wage law.

=== Immigration and Islam ===
Emmer supported President Donald Trump's 2017 executive order to temporarily curtail immigration from seven predominantly Muslim countries until better screening methods are devised, saying, "Everybody needs to take a deep breath. There is no litmus test based on religion. The administration and I understand it has—takes the seven countries identified by the Obama administration, not this administration, as the most dangerous countries when it comes to potential terrorists."

In January 2026, Emmer was named a founding member of the Sharia-Free America Caucus, which seeks to ban Sharia law. He said, "Sharia is completely incompatible with the American way of life and threatens the very fabric of our society." The Council on American–Islamic Relations (CAIR), a civil rights organization, quoted Emmer and other House members in a statement designating the Sharia Free America Caucus an anti-Muslim hate group and saying the caucus's agenda "would effectively ban the practice of the world's second largest religion in the United States."

On June 25, 2026, Emmer made a speech at a Faith and Freedom Coalition event on Capitol Hill that criticized immigrants, particularly Somali immigrants, for not assimilating, and said that immigrants who do not assimilate "should go the hell back to where they came from". Representative Angie Craig called Emmer's comments "racist". Representative Ilhan Omar, who immigrated to the US from Somalia, responded, "I assimilated all the way to Congress and this idiot still tells me to go back where I came from".

=== Israel ===
Emmer voted to provide Israel with support following the 2023 Hamas attack on Israel.

=== Pharmacy conscience clause ===
Emmer has supported "conscience clause" legislation that would allow pharmacists to refuse to dispense contraception on the basis of "ethical, moral or legal grounds as long as the pharmacist notifies their employer in advance and the employer can ensure a patient has timely access to the drug or device".

=== Same-sex marriage ===
Emmer supported a state constitutional amendment banning civil recognition of same-sex marriage or its legal equivalent, saying, "I believe marriage is the union between one man and one woman." In 2007, he introduced HF 1847, an amendment to the Minnesota Constitution "recognizing as marriage or its legal equivalent only a union between one man and one woman." Voters later rejected 2012 Minnesota Amendment 1.

Emmer was among 47 Republican representatives who voted for the Respect for Marriage Act, which codified the right to same-sex marriage in federal law.

=== Nullification ===
In 2010 Emmer sponsored an amendment to the Minnesota Constitution that would allow the state to nullify federal laws.

=== Taxes ===
Emmer strongly opposes tax increases. He has also proposed gradually reducing the state corporate tax, with the eventual goal of repealing it altogether.

As House majority whip, Emmer was responsible for managing Republican votes necessary to pass the 2025 One Big Beautiful Bill Act. One of the law's provisions made the 2017 Tax Cuts and Jobs Act's tax rates permanent. The nonpartisan Urban Institute-Brookings Institution Tax Policy Center said the move gave richer households larger benefits. Emmer told a reporter, "The 'huge tax cuts to the wealthy' actually makes me smile, because you gotta be kidding me [...] we were only making [permanent] the tax policy that has been in place for the last seven years. So this argument, the tax cuts for the rich, that's seven years old."

=== Canadian tariffs ===
Emmer voted against a House resolution to end President Trump's declaration of a national emergency that imposed tariffs on Canada. The resolution passed, with six Republicans voting in favor. Canada is Minnesota's largest trading partner.

=== Trump felony conviction ===
When former president Trump was convicted of 34 felony counts of falsifying business records, Emmer said, "Democrats just pulled off the biggest sham in U.S. history". Emmer served as Trump's Minnesota campaign chair. He joined other Republican leaders in condemning Trump's conviction and appeared with other Republican leaders, promising "to use House oversight powers and other measures to target jurisdictions pursuing prosecutions of the former president."

=== "Tip credit" ===
On July 5, 2010, after visiting a restaurant in St. Paul, Emmer was asked during a press conference whether he supported a tip credit, the policy of allowing businesses to subtract tips from a server's hourly wage. His response was "Yes... if you didn't have a minimum wage law", adding, "somebody could be taking home well over one hundred thousand dollars as a server" while the restaurant owner could be making much less.

One week after that press conference, Emmer announced a proposal that would exempt the first $20,000 a server makes in tips from state taxes. At the same press conference a protester dumped $20 in pennies on Emmer's lap.

=== Vote to defund the vice president ===
On November 8, 2023, Emmer joined 100 other Republicans voting for an amendment to a large appropriations bill that would prohibit funding for the Office of Vice President Kamala Harris.

=== Canadian wildfires ===
Emmer was one of six Republican members of Congress who signed a July 7, 2025, letter to Canadian ambassador to the U.S. Kirsten Hillman complaining that smoke from Canadian wildfires was inconveniencing his state's residents.

== Personal life ==
In 1910, Emmer's great-grandfather and his two brothers founded Emmer Brothers Lumber. It is now called Viking Forest Products and is employee-owned. Viking Forest Products is a subsidiary of Forest City Trading Group, one of the nation's largest wholesalers of forest products.

Emmer has seven children with his wife, Jacqueline, whom he married in 1986. He is a hockey player and coach. Emmer is a Roman Catholic.

Party political offices
Preceded by Tim Pawlenty	Republican nominee for Governor of Minnesota; 2010	Succeeded by Jeff Johnson
Preceded by Steve Stivers	Chair of the National Republican Congressional Committee; 2019–2023	Succeeded by Richard Hudson
U.S. House of Representatives
Preceded by Michele Bachmann	Member of the U.S. House of Representatives from Minnesota's 6th congressional district 2015–present	Incumbent
Preceded by Jim Clyburn	House Majority Whip; 2023–present	Incumbent
Preceded by Katherine Clark	House Minority Whip; Taking office 2027	Designate
U.S. order of precedence (ceremonial)
Preceded by Debbie Dingell	United States representatives by seniority 134th	Succeeded by Glenn Grothman
Preceded by Hakeem Jeffries as House Minority Leader	Order of precedence of the United States	Succeeded by Katherine Clark as House Minority Whip
