= Mark Schweizer =

American musician and author (1956–2019)

Mark Schweizer (June 12, 1956 – November 9, 2019) was an American classical musician, composer, writer, and music professor.

== Education and musical career ==
A native of Florida, Schweizer received music degrees from Stetson University in DeLand and the University of Arizona including a doctorate in vocal performance. He returned to teach at Stetson University, followed by eight years at Louisiana College in Pineville. He also taught at Austin Peay State University, Murray State University, Hopkinsville Community College and the University of the South.

As a bass-baritone, Schweizer performed with regional opera companies across the country, in solo recital, and in oratorio including appearing as the bass soloist with Robert Shaw and the Atlanta Symphony in Beethoven's Ninth Symphony.

Schweizer was the president and editor of St. James Music Press in Tryon, North Carolina.

He was also the author of The Liturgical Mysteries murder mystery series: The Alto Wore Tweed, The Baritone Wore Chiffon, The Tenor Wore Tapshoes, The Soprano Wore Falsettos, The Bass Wore Scales, The Mezzo Wore Mink, The Diva Wore Diamonds, The Organist Wore Pumps, The Countertenor Wore Garlic, The Treble Wore Trouble, The Christmas Cantata, The Cantor Wore Crinolines, The Maestro Wore Mohair, The Lyric Wore Lycra, and The Choir Director Wore Out.

Schweizer was active as a composer, arranger, editor, and librettist. As a composer, his work consisted primarily of choral works for sacred use, including church operas and musicals. Besides libretti written for himself to set, he also wrote libretti for operas with composers Richard Shephard and Carson Cooman.

== Other pursuits ==
He also hosted a classical music radio show, attempted to cash in on the pot-bellied pig boom of the 1980s, built a log cabin, and directed stage productions.

== Personal life ==
Schweizer and his wife had two children, Lindy Buss and Chris Schweizer, and two grandchildren, Addie Buss and Penny Schweizer .
