= Dick Borrell =

American politician (born 1951)

Member of the Minnesota House of Representatives from the 19B district
- In office January 7, 2003 – January 4, 2005
- Preceded by: Bruce Anderson
- Succeeded by: Tom Emmer

Personal details
- Born: September 24, 1951 (age 74) Waverly, Minnesota, U.S.
- Party: Republican
- Other political affiliations: Democratic (until late 1980s)
- Children: 5
- Education: Minnesota State University, Mankato (BS)
- Occupation: Politician, Businessman, High School Business Teacher

Dick Borrell (born September 24, 1951) was an American politician.

Borrell lived in Waverly, Minnesota and graduated from St. Mary's Catholic High School in Waverly. He served in the United States Marine Corps. Borrell received his two bachelor's degrees in business education and business administration from Minnesota State University, Mankato in Mankato, Minnesota. He was a businessman and high school business teacher. Borrell served in the Minnesota House of Representatives in 2003 and 2004 and was a Republican. He was a Democrat until he switched to the Republican Party in the late 1980s.

Minnesota House of Representatives
Preceded by Bruce Anderson	Member of the Minnesota House of Representatives from the 19B district 2003–2005	Succeeded by Tom Emmer
