= Friendly Hills (Tryon, North Carolina) =

Historic house in North Carolina, United States

- U.S. National Register of Historic Places
- Location within North Carolina Location within the United States
- Location: 140 Country Club Rd., near Tryon, North Carolina
- Coordinates: 35°13′13″N 82°15′1″W
- Built: 1924
- Architect: Gaines, Wright J.
- Architectural style: Tudor Revival
- NRHP reference No.: 98000731
- Added to NRHP: June 26, 1998

Friendly Hills, also known as Margaret Culkin Banning House, is a historic estate located near Tryon, Polk County, North Carolina. The house was built in 1924, and is a large, two-story, Tudor Revival style dwelling with stuccoed exterior walls decorated with hewn, half timbering. Also on the property are the contributing swimming pool (c. 1920s-1930s), log cabin used as a writing retreat by author Margaret Culkin Banning (1891–1982) (c. 1920s-1930s), and fish pool (1920s). Ms. Banning purchased Friendly Hills in 1936 and enjoyed the property seasonally for the remainder of her life.

It was added to the National Register of Historic Places in 1998.
