= Waverly Village Hall (Waverly, Minnesota) =

- U.S. National Register of Historic Places
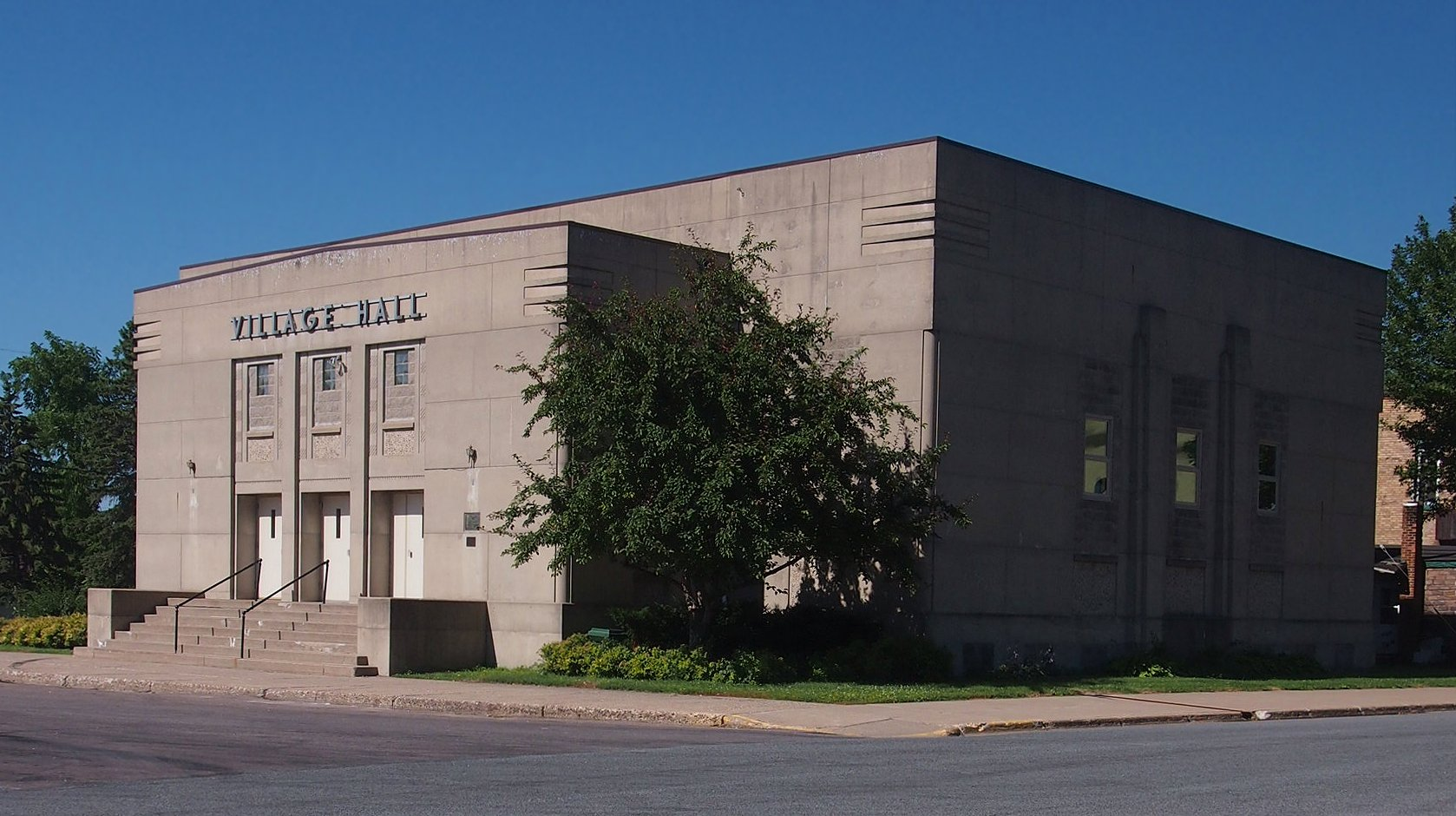
- Waverly Village Hall viewed from the northeast

- Location within Minnesota Location within the United States
- Location: 204 4th Street, Waverly, Minnesota
- Coordinates: 45°4′0.4″N 93°58′2.4″W
- Area: Less than one acre
- Built: 1939–40
- Built by: Works Progress Administration
- Architect: Walter R. Dennis
- Architectural style: Moderne
- NRHP reference No.: 02000613
- Added to NRHP: June 6, 2002

Waverly Village Hall is a municipal event hall in Waverly, Minnesota, United States, built by the Works Progress Administration (WPA) from 1939 to 1940. It was listed on the National Register of Historic Places in 2002 for its local significance in the themes of architecture, entertainment/recreation, and government/politics. It was nominated as a representative of the civic facilities made possible with New Deal federal assistance, as well as for its Moderne architecture and role as a community event space.

== Description ==
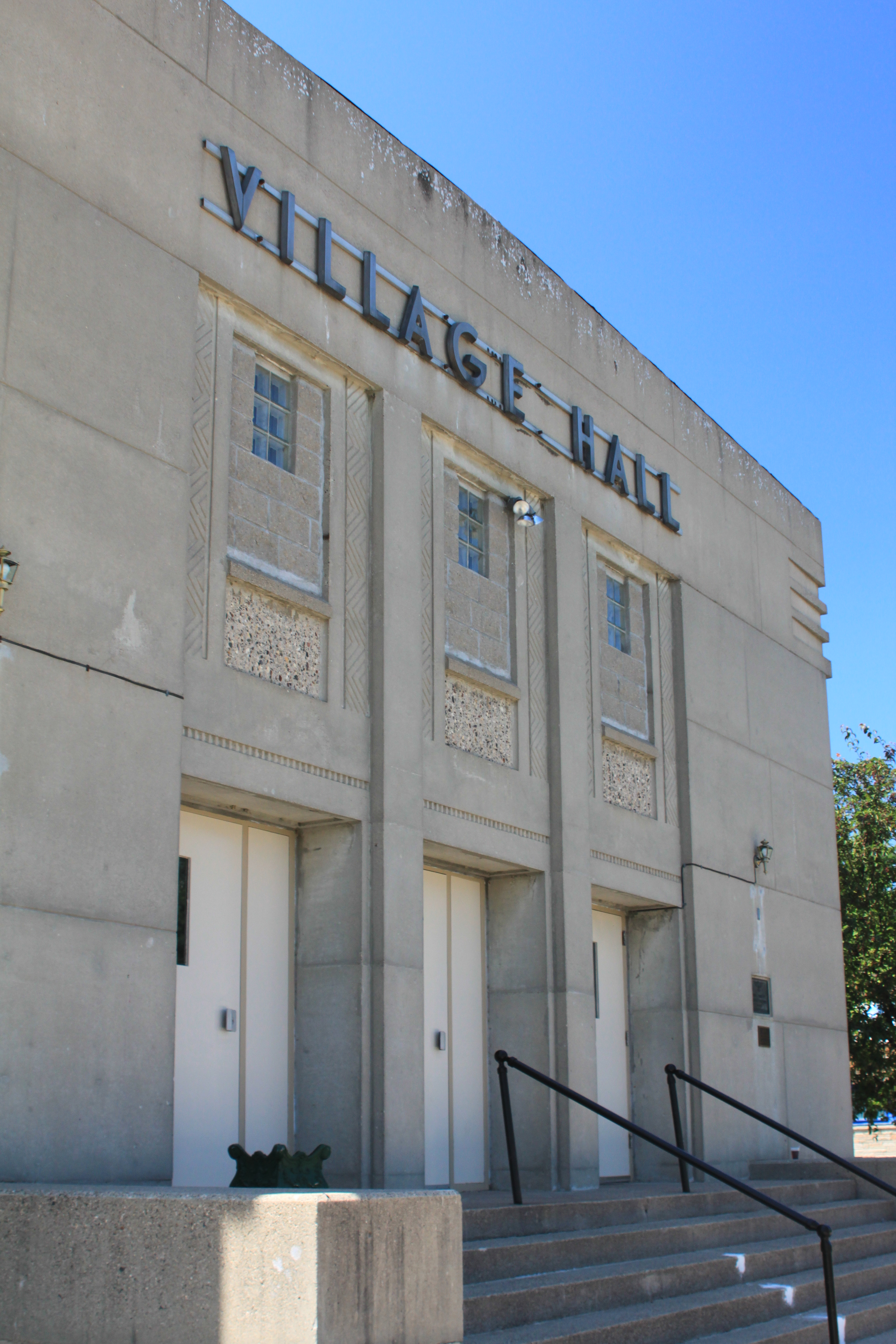
Detail of the main entrance

Waverly Village Hall is a rectangular building with a projecting entrance bay. It is constructed of reinforced concrete whose outermost layer was scored to form rectangular panels. A wide set of stairs leads up to three slightly recessed doorways at the main entrance. These were originally double doors flanked by Moderne light fixtures, but have been replaced with single doors and contemporary lights. Lined up above each doorway is a textured panel surrounding a small window. This is surmounted by a metal Art Deco sign reading "Village Hall." The corners of the main section and the entrance bay are rounded and topped with decorative fins. The sides of the main section feature three tall windows flanked by texturing similar to the front façade.

The main entrances lead to a foyer with a ticket booth flanked by doorways leading to the auditorium. Floored in maple, the auditorium measures 77 by 57 feet (23 by 17 m). Recessed into the far wall is a 43-by-17-foot (13.1 by 5.2 m) stage. Short hallways lead to rest rooms, dressing rooms, and rear exits. A lower level contains a large dining hall, kitchen, coat rooms, a locker room, and utility areas.

== Origin ==
Waverly's original 1893 village hall, which housed the community's government offices, fire department, jail, and ballroom, was gutted by a fire in 1938. In the midst of the Great Depression the village did not have the funds to build a new facility. During this period, however, the federal government was sponsoring numerous programs to assist local communities with construction projects that would also create jobs for the unemployed.

Waverly officials applied to the district office of the Works Progress Administration in January 1939. Their submission included preliminary plans by Minneapolis-based architect Walter R. Dennis, and the village had secured a site at a prominent intersection. The application was approved by the national office in March. In addition to construction of the new building, the application also provided for cleanup of the old village hall site and remodeling of a separate building recently purchased to be the new fire station.

Construction began later in 1939 and was completed in August 1940. The building was dedicated over Labor Day weekend in a festival that included band performances, baseball games, carnival rides, tours, and a dance in the auditorium.

== Use ==
Waverly Village Hall was designed exclusively as an event venue—government offices and services were housed in other buildings secured shortly after the village's original hall was destroyed by a fire. The replacement hall quickly became a center of social life for residents of Waverly and neighboring towns. It hosted numerous wedding receptions, as well as dances, school plays, banquets, and concerts. Waverly resident Hubert Humphrey gave numerous speeches there. The hall was booked by churches and organizations like the Knights of Columbus, and even hosted athletic events such as basketball games and roller skating.

The hall is still operated by the city of Waverly as an event venue.

== See also ==
- List of city and town halls in the United States
- National Register of Historic Places listings in Wright County, Minnesota
