= George Charles Aid =

American painter (1872–1938)

- Born: 1872; Quincy, Illinois, U.S.
- Died: 1938 (aged 65–66); Tryon, North Carolina, U.S.
- Education: St. Louis School of Fine Arts - Académie Julian
- Known for: Painting, etching
- Spouse: Mary Orr
- Awards: Silver Medal St. Louis fair

George Charles Aid or George Aid (1872–1938), born in Quincy, Illinois, was an American painter, etcher and teacher known for portrait, landscape and genre painting. Aid was active in France, the Netherlands and The Carolinas.

== Biography ==
George Charles Aid studied at the St. Louis School of Fine Arts in St. Louis and started working as an illustrator for various St. Louis newspapers. In 1899, he was granted a scholarship to travel and study in Paris, France. He registered at the Académie Julian and started working under Jean-Paul Laurens, Jean-Joseph Benjamin-Constant, Lucien Simon, and Charles Cottet at the Académie de la Grande Chaumière. He exhibited his work in art venues in France and the US and won a silver medal at the 1904 St. Louis World's Fair.

In 1906, the Swedish government purchased one of Aid's paintings as it was being shown at the Paris Salon. Aid and Clarence Gagnon, Huc-Mazelet Luquiens, and Herman Armour Webster were also invited to show his etching work. His work was reviewed by art critics such as Charles DeKay.

Aid stayed in France for fifteen years, meeting other American artists like Richard E. Miller and Frederick Carl Frieseke. He also met a young music student from South Carolina named Mary Orr, who became his wife in 1910. The couple moved to Italy.

After World War I started, George and Mary moved back to the United States. They travelled for several years, settling in Tryon, North Carolina, in 1920. They chose Tryon because, like in Europe, they could find both a vineyard and an artistic colony. During the 1920s, George Charles Aid became a reputable artist by teaching etching and doing portraits of prominent people of the Carolinas. He was also commissioned to paint The Baptism of Virginia Dare, commemorating early North Carolina history. The painting was later donated to the Mint Museum in Charlotte.

George Charles Aid died in Tryon in 1938.

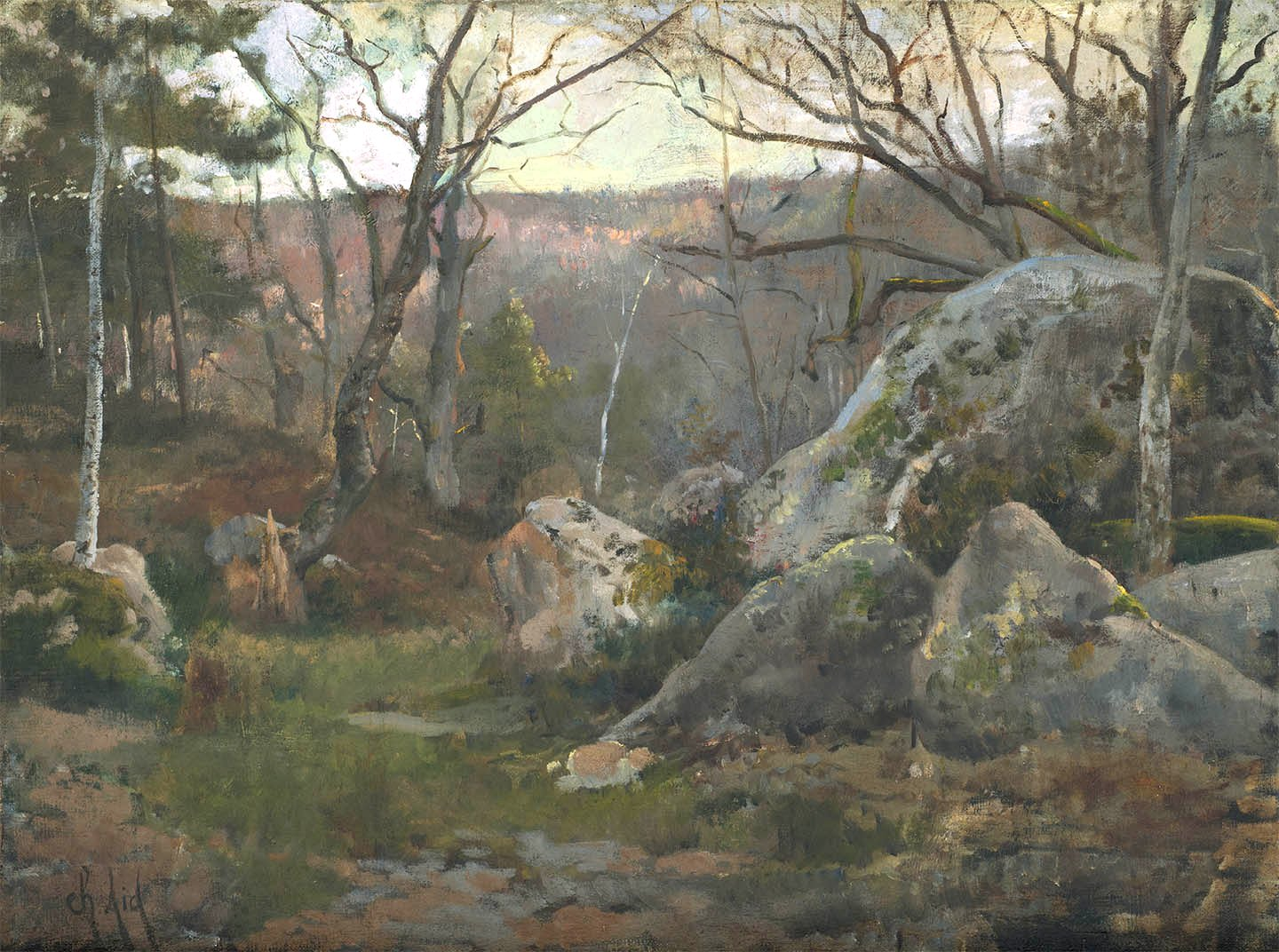
Winter in Fontainebleau Forest

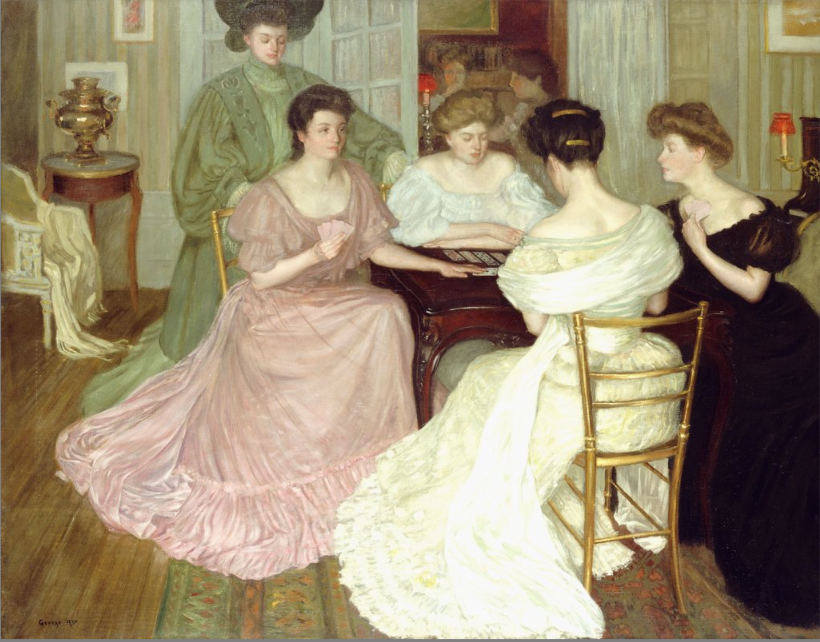
The Bridge Players

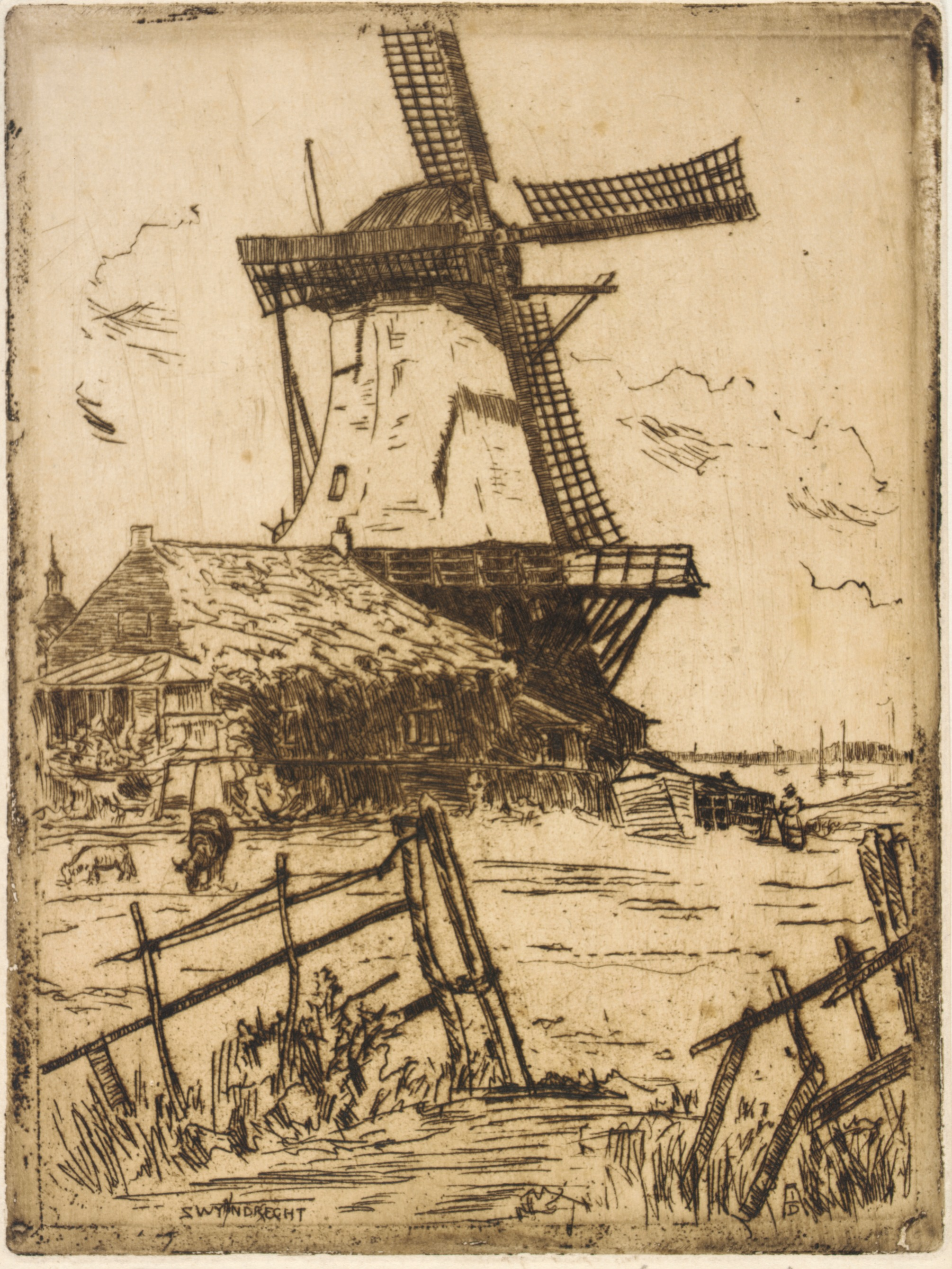
Windmill, Zwyndrecht

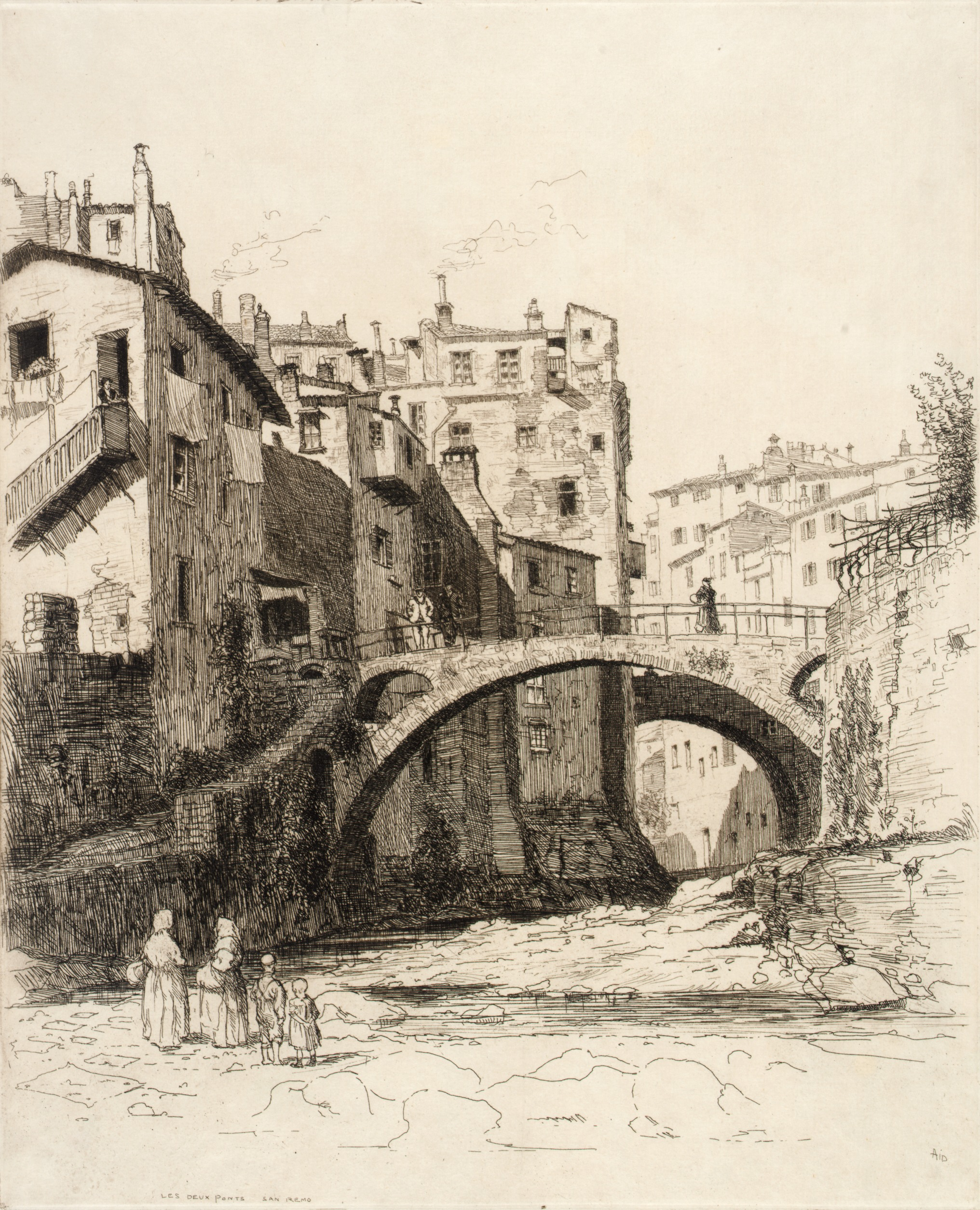
Les Deux Ponts, San Remo

== Collections ==
- Asheville Art Museum
- Smithsonian American Art Museum
- Metropolitan Museum of Art
- Art Institute of Chicago
- The Mint Museum of Art in Charlotte
- National Gallery of Art
- Tryon's History Museum
- Lanier Library.
- The Johnson Collection, Spartanburg, South Carolina
- Springville Museum of Art
- City Art Museum of Saint Louis
- Clark Art Institute
