= Tryon, North Carolina =

Town in Polk County, North Carolina, United States

- Town
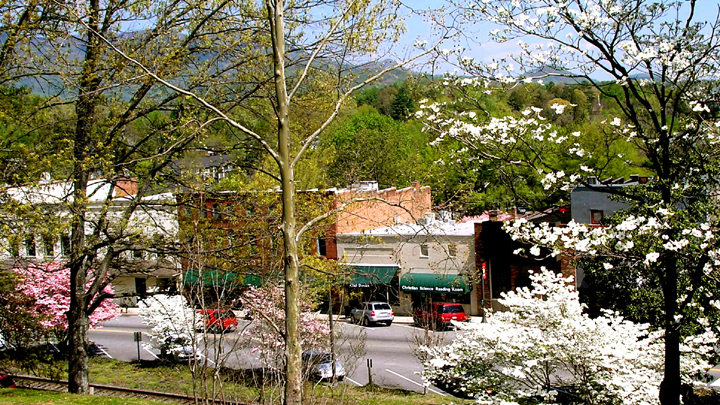
- Trade Street, Tryon, North Carolina

- Seal
- Motto: "The Friendliest Town In The South"
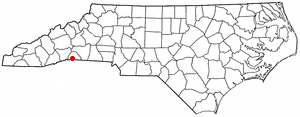
- Location of Tryon, North Carolina
- Coordinates: 35°12′31″N 82°15′03″W
- Country: United States
- State: North Carolina
- County: Polk
- Incorporated: 1885
- Named for: William Tryon

Area
  - Total: 2.00 sq mi (5.17 km^{2})
  - Land: 2.00 sq mi (5.17 km^{2})
  - Water: 0 sq mi (0.00 km^{2})
- Elevation: 1,063 ft (324 m)

Population (2020)
  - Total: 1,562
  - Density: 782.0/sq mi (301.94/km^{2})
- Time zone: UTC-5 (Eastern (EST))
  - Summer (DST): UTC-4 (EDT)
- ZIP code: 28782
- Area code: 828
- FIPS code: 37-68580
- GNIS feature ID: 2406761
- Website: tryon-nc.com

Tryon is a town in Polk County, on the southwestern border of North Carolina, United States. As of the 2020 census, the city population was 1,562. Located in the escarpment of the Blue Ridge Mountains, today the area is affluent and a center for outdoor pursuits, equestrian activity, and fine arts.

Tryon Peak and the Town of Tryon are named for William Tryon, Governor of North Carolina from 1765 to 1771. He was honored for his negotiation with the Cherokee for a treaty during a period of conflict following the French and Indian War.

== History ==
=== Cherokee hunting ground ===
The area which Tryon now occupies was originally part of the Cherokee hunting grounds of Western North Carolina. Archaeological evidence dates indigenous peoples' occupation of the site to the end of the last ice age, more than 11,000 years ago. Successive cultures occupied the river valleys. Semi-permanent villages appeared in the area by about 8,000 B.C.

They later developed towns with a democratic political structure, developing religion, domesticated crops, pottery and skilled, powerful archery. The culture developed cultivated vegetables, and hunted and fished. Each historic Cherokee village had a peace chief, war chief, and priest.

=== Spanish discovery ===
De Soto's Exploration (1539–1540)

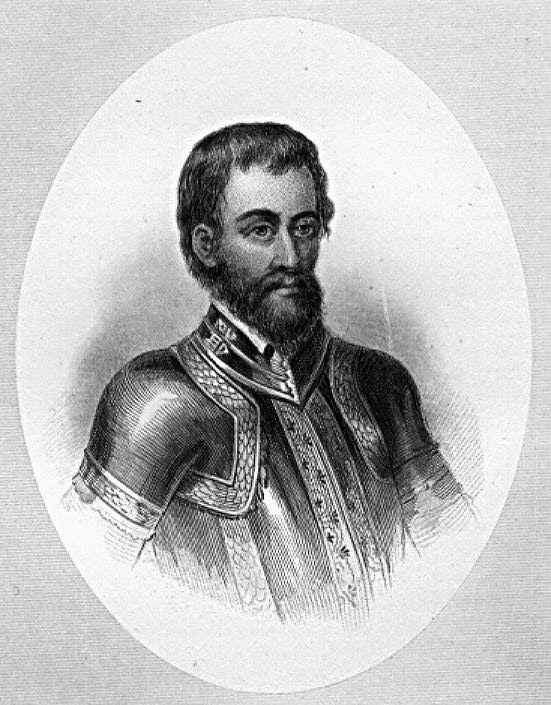
Hernando de Soto, Spanish explorer and conquistador

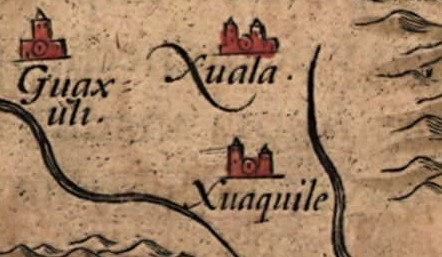
Map of a portion of de Soto's route, including Cherokee village Xuala (now Tryon)

Having landed near present-day Panama City, Florida on May 30, 1539, Spanish explorer Hernando de Soto reputedly traveled up to the area of present-day Spartanburg, South Carolina and then north into western North Carolina. Traveling on horses, de Soto and 1,000 men arrived in North Carolina in mid-May 1540. In search of gold, de Soto explored the area of Asheville area and met with the Cherokee in their village of Xuala, the area now known as Tryon. After a day or two, de Soto continued his journey with provisions provided by the Cherokee.

Luys Hernandez de Biedma, one of de Soto's officers, wrote of a group of Spanish men who made their way to Xuala on May 21, 1540:

The next day, they went to Xuala which is a town on a plain between some rivers; its chief was so well provisioned that he gave to the Christians however much they asked for: slaves, corn, little dogs [probably opossums]… and however much he had.</

From there, de Soto went to Gauxuile (since developed as Asheville), which in Cherokee meant "The place where they race," named for the walk around the perimeter of the village.

=== Early English settlement, French and Indian War ===
In the earliest periods of settlement, the British traders and Cherokee enjoyed peaceful relations. Most of the British colonists settled in the coastal areas, where they had more contact with Algonquian-speaking peoples. A treaty signed in 1730 resulted in a greater influx of white traders and settlers to Cherokee territory. An early home, Seven Hearths, was built in 1740, and it is reputedly the oldest clapboard house in the county. It was moved to its present location in 1934. A log cabin that served as quarters for enslaved African Americans was also built about 1740. It was moved and rebuilt next to Seven Hearths in the 1930s.

The French and Indian War, the North American front of the Seven Years War, primarily between England and France, ended the peace that had existed between the Cherokee and the English settlers. Both the French and the English recruited Native American allies to aid their militias. The French were allied with the Creek people (Muscogee), traditional competitors of the Cherokee. The French tried to make allies of the Cherokee as well, who had been affiliated with the British because of their trading history. The French encouraged the Shawnee to raid settlements of the English.

As conflict and tension increased, the British built defensive forts along the frontier, including the "Block House" near the future Tryon. Tensions with the Cherokee continued after Britain defeated France in the large war. The Cherokee were resisting repeated incursions into their territory by English colonists.

In 1767 William Tryon, governor of the North Carolina Colony from 1765 to 1771), traveled to the area and negotiated a peace treaty with the Cherokee. They established a boundary line between a location near Greenville, South Carolina, the highest point on White Oak Mountain (renamed Tryon Peak by the settlers). Settlers, though, did not commit to the boundary. With the outbreak of the Revolutionary War, some Cherokee hoped to expel the white settlers from their lands.

In the spring of 1776, Cherokee met on Round Mountain and planned an attack on the "Block House", Earl's Fort in Landrum, South Carolina, and Young's Fort near the current town of Mill Spring, North Carolina. Aware of the plans, a Cherokee named Skyuka went to the "Block House", where he warned his friend Capt. Thomas Howard of the impending attacks. Howard and the assembled local militia took a trail toward Round Mountain, where they met and defeated the Cherokee at a gap in the valley, now known as Howard Gap. Settlers honored Skyuka by the naming of Skyuka Creek, Skyuka Road, and the YMCA Camp Skyuka on Mount Tryon.

=== Post office ===
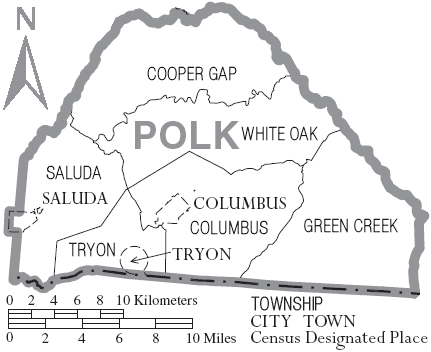
Map of Polk County, North Carolina with Municipal and Township labels

In 1839 a post office was established at the Top of Howard Gap and Holberts Cove Roads run by the Thompson Family, named the Tryon Post office, In early Polk what is now the Saluda township was called the Tryon township, present day Tryon was in the Columbus Township; until Tryon city was established in 1885 both were named after Governor Tryon.

=== Rail service and hospitality ===
By 1877 the railroad provided regular transportation from South Carolina seaports around Charleston, SC to North Carolina, Tennessee, and the Ohio Valley. The particular spot that became the town of Tryon was the point where construction of the railroad to Asheville stopped for two years. West of Tryon, the railroad ascends the Blue Ridge along the Saluda Grade, which was the steepest railroad grade in the country before it became inactive.

At the peak of railroad expansion in 1885, Tryon was incorporated. By the 1890s, the railway made six daily stops in Tryon. The current depot building, built in 1922, is the third depot built. After expansion of individual automobile use, railroads restructured their offerings and passenger service to Tryon ended in 1968.

Oak Hall

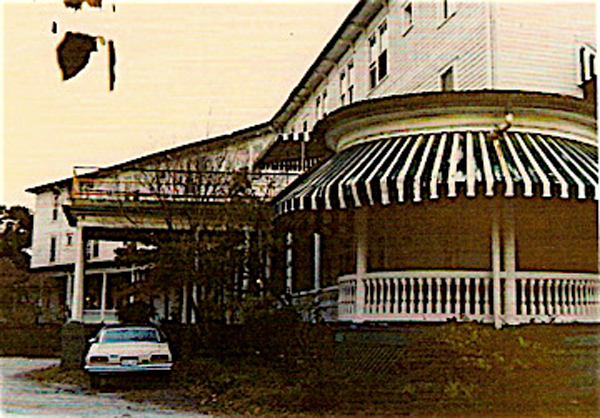
Oak Hall, Tryon, NC

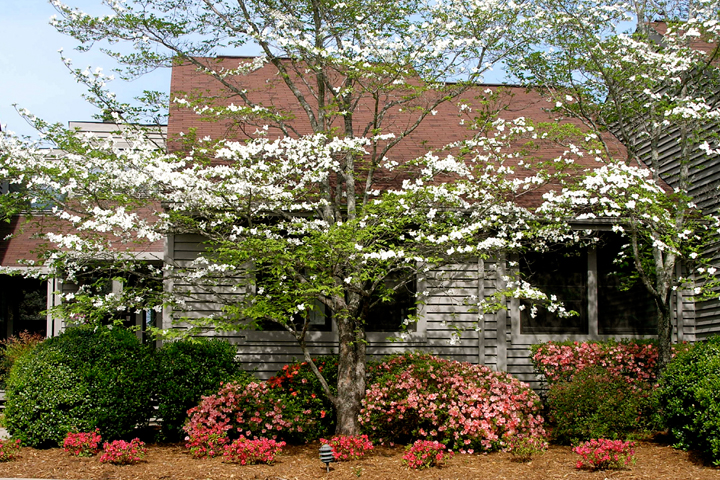
Condominium complex at the previous Oak Hall location

Oak Hall, originally built as the Tryon Hotel in 1881, is located on a bluff that looks over Trade Street. It had notable guests into the 20th century, such as Henry Ford, Thomas Edison, British film actor David Niven, Sherlock Holmes actor William Gillette, writer F. Scott Fitzgerald, composer George Gershwin, First Lady Mrs. Calvin Coolidge, Lady Nancy Astor, and Mrs. George C. Marshall, wife of the World War II general. The hotel was redeveloped as a condominium complex in the early 21st century.

Appreciative of the ice cream served at Misseldine's drug store (previously located at the bank site on Trade Street), F. Scott Fitzgerald wrote the following ditty,

Oh Misseldine's, dear Misseldine's,
A dive we'll ne'er forget,
The taste of its banana splits
Is on our tonsils yet.
Its chocolate fudge makes livers budge,
It's really too divine,
And as we reel, we'll give one squeal
For dear old Misseldine's.

=== Tropical Storm Helene ===
On September 27, 2024, Helene caused considerable damage in Tryon.

== Geography ==
The town's original boundary was established as a circle with a radius of three quarters of a mile. According to the United States Census Bureau, the town has a total area of 1.8 square miles (4.7 km^{2}), all land.

=== Climate ===
Tryon is located near a "thermal belt", an area generally free of dew and frost, which provides an enjoyable climate year-round.

The mountain climate attracted many of Tryon's visitors as it developed as a resort, and residents, some of whom have second homes here. In this region of the Blue Ridge mountains, air may be warmer on the slopes than in the base of a valley, particularly in the spring and fall. It has longer periods of warm weather throughout the year, producing greater crop yields. Tryon has a climate similar to comparable areas of the Piedmont.

Climate data for Tryon, North Carolina (1991–2020 normals, extremes 1917–present)
| Month | Jan | Feb | Mar | Apr | May | Jun | Jul | Aug | Sep | Oct | Nov | Dec | Year |
|---|---|---|---|---|---|---|---|---|---|---|---|---|---|
| Record high °F (°C) | 83 (28) | 83 (28) | 92 (33) | 95 (35) | 98 (37) | 105 (41) | 105 (41) | 103 (39) | 105 (41) | 96 (36) | 87 (31) | 82 (28) | 105 (41) |
| Mean daily maximum °F (°C) | 49.6 (9.8) | 53.7 (12.1) | 61.3 (16.3) | 70.2 (21.2) | 76.8 (24.9) | 83.2 (28.4) | 86.3 (30.2) | 84.7 (29.3) | 79.2 (26.2) | 70.3 (21.3) | 60.4 (15.8) | 52.0 (11.1) | 69.0 (20.6) |
| Daily mean °F (°C) | 40.8 (4.9) | 43.9 (6.6) | 50.8 (10.4) | 59.5 (15.3) | 67.0 (19.4) | 74.0 (23.3) | 77.5 (25.3) | 76.0 (24.4) | 70.5 (21.4) | 60.6 (15.9) | 50.8 (10.4) | 43.5 (6.4) | 59.6 (15.3) |
| Mean daily minimum °F (°C) | 31.9 (−0.1) | 34.1 (1.2) | 40.4 (4.7) | 48.8 (9.3) | 57.2 (14.0) | 64.9 (18.3) | 68.6 (20.3) | 67.3 (19.6) | 61.8 (16.6) | 50.9 (10.5) | 41.2 (5.1) | 35.0 (1.7) | 50.2 (10.1) |
| Record low °F (°C) | −8 (−22) | 2 (−17) | 10 (−12) | 18 (−8) | 29 (−2) | 38 (3) | 44 (7) | 46 (8) | 35 (2) | 23 (−5) | 8 (−13) | 0 (−18) | −8 (−22) |
| Average precipitation inches (mm) | 5.32 (135) | 4.47 (114) | 5.52 (140) | 5.31 (135) | 5.34 (136) | 5.48 (139) | 5.55 (141) | 6.07 (154) | 5.63 (143) | 4.90 (124) | 4.80 (122) | 5.96 (151) | 64.35 (1,634) |
| Average snowfall inches (cm) | 2.4 (6.1) | 0.8 (2.0) | 0.6 (1.5) | 0.0 (0.0) | 0.0 (0.0) | 0.0 (0.0) | 0.0 (0.0) | 0.0 (0.0) | 0.0 (0.0) | 0.0 (0.0) | 0.0 (0.0) | 1.1 (2.8) | 4.9 (12) |
| Average precipitation days (≥ 0.01 in) | 11.4 | 10.3 | 11.7 | 10.7 | 12.0 | 13.4 | 13.4 | 13.3 | 10.0 | 8.8 | 9.0 | 11.1 | 135.1 |
| Average snowy days (≥ 0.1 in) | 1.0 | 0.5 | 0.4 | 0.0 | 0.0 | 0.0 | 0.0 | 0.0 | 0.0 | 0.0 | 0.0 | 0.5 | 2.4 |
Source: NOAA

== Demographics ==
Historical population
| Census | Pop. | Note | %± |
|---|---|---|---|
| 1900 | 324 | | — |
| 1910 | 700 | | 116.0% |
| 1920 | 1,067 | | 52.4% |
| 1930 | 1,670 | | 56.5% |
| 1940 | 2,043 | | 22.3% |
| 1950 | 1,985 | | −2.8% |
| 1960 | 2,223 | | 12.0% |
| 1970 | 1,951 | | −12.2% |
| 1980 | 1,796 | | −7.9% |
| 1990 | 1,680 | | −6.5% |
| 2000 | 1,760 | | 4.8% |
| 2010 | 1,646 | | −6.5% |
| 2020 | 1,562 | | −5.1% |
U.S. Decennial Census

=== 2020 census ===
Tryon racial composition
| Race | Number | Percentage |
|---|---|---|
| White (non-Hispanic) | 1,207 | 77.27% |
| Black or African American (non-Hispanic) | 190 | 12.16% |
| Native American | 3 | 0.19% |
| Asian | 7 | 0.45% |
| Other/Mixed | 94 | 6.02% |
| Hispanic or Latino | 61 | 3.91% |

As of the 2020 United States census, there were 1,562 people, 823 households, and 280 families residing in the town.

=== 2000 census ===
As of the census of 2000, there were 1,760 people, 869 households, and 452 families residing in the town. The population density was 955.0 inhabitants per square mile (368.7/km^{2}). There were 985 housing units at an average density of 534.5 per square mile (206.4/km^{2}). The racial makeup of the town was 77.16% White, 21.02% African American, 0.28% Native American, 0.11% Asian, 0.68% from other races, and 0.74% from two or more races. Hispanic or Latino of any race were 1.25% of the population.

There were 869 households, out of which 16.3% had children under the age of 18 living with them, 39.8% were married couples living together, 10.1% had a female householder with no husband present, and 47.9% were non-families. 44.8% of all households were made up of individuals, and 28.8% had someone living alone who was 65 years of age or older. The average household size was 1.92 and the average family size was 2.66.

In the town, the population was spread out, with 16.7% under the age of 18, 4.2% from 18 to 24, 19.6% from 25 to 44, 21.8% from 45 to 64, and 37.7% who were 65 years of age or older. The median age was 52 years. For every 100 females, there were 72.7 males. For every 100 females age 18 and over, there were 68.9 males.

The median income for a household in the town was $31,449, and the median income for a family was $44,485. Males had a median income of $35,956 versus $23,333 for females. The per capita income for the town was $21,347. About 7.9% of families and 14.3% of the population were below the poverty line, including 23.2% of those under age 18 and 9.4% of those age 65 or over.

More than half of Tryon's full-time residents are "transplants" from other areas of the country. Some have helped to create the cultural center that continues to attract writers, educators, artists, and professional people to the Tryon area.

=== Religion ===
Tryon's churches include: Grace Foothills Church (PCA), which meets in the historic Tryon Theatre; Tryon Presbyterian Church (PCUSA), Holy Cross Church & Chapel (Episcopal), Congregational Church, St. John the Baptist Catholic Church, First Baptist Church, Tryon United Methodist Church, Trinity Lutheran Church LCMS. Other churches include Garrison Chapel Baptist Church.

The Good Shepherd Episcopal Church, originally a slave chapel known as St. Andrews, located on the Coxe Plantation, was moved to Tryon in 1955, on Jackson Road. Its African-American congregation has kept its original furnishings and glass.

== Economy ==
=== Agriculture ===
The southern exposure of Tryon's hills supports the production of orchards and vineyards. Vineyards were established in the Pacolet Valley, on Old Howard Gap, and other Tryon locations. By the 1950s the industry suffered due to decline in railroad transportation and competition with Californian grapes. However, viticulture is beginning to make a comeback in the area; since the 1990s, several vineyards have been established in and around Tryon.

=== Tourism ===
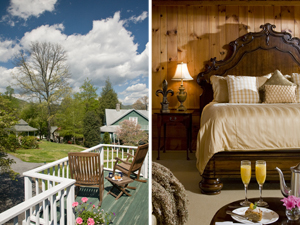
1906 Pine Crest Inn

Tryon has a long history as a tourism destination, particularly as a retreat for writers and artists.

The Pine Crest Inn was built in 1906 as a sanitarium for those with tuberculosis. Before the discovery of penicillin, rest in mountain air was considered helpful in the treatment of TB, which was often fatal. In 1917 the sanitarium was converted to an inn. Early in the inn's history, hunters were attracted by its location, on the edge of hunting country. Swayback cabin, now more than 240 years old, hosted American writers Ernest Hemingway and F. Scott Fitzgerald.

The inn was listed on the National Register of Historic Places in 1982. Its dining room is ranked by AAA as four diamonds.

Tryon has also long been a center of equestrian-related tourism. Over the years, Tryon has served as a training location for the U.S. Olympic Equestrian team. In 2018, Tryon played host to the FEI World Equestrian Games, the “Horse Olympics,” which drew hundreds of thousands of visitors to the area.

== Culture ==
=== Arts ===
The Tryon Fine Arts Center

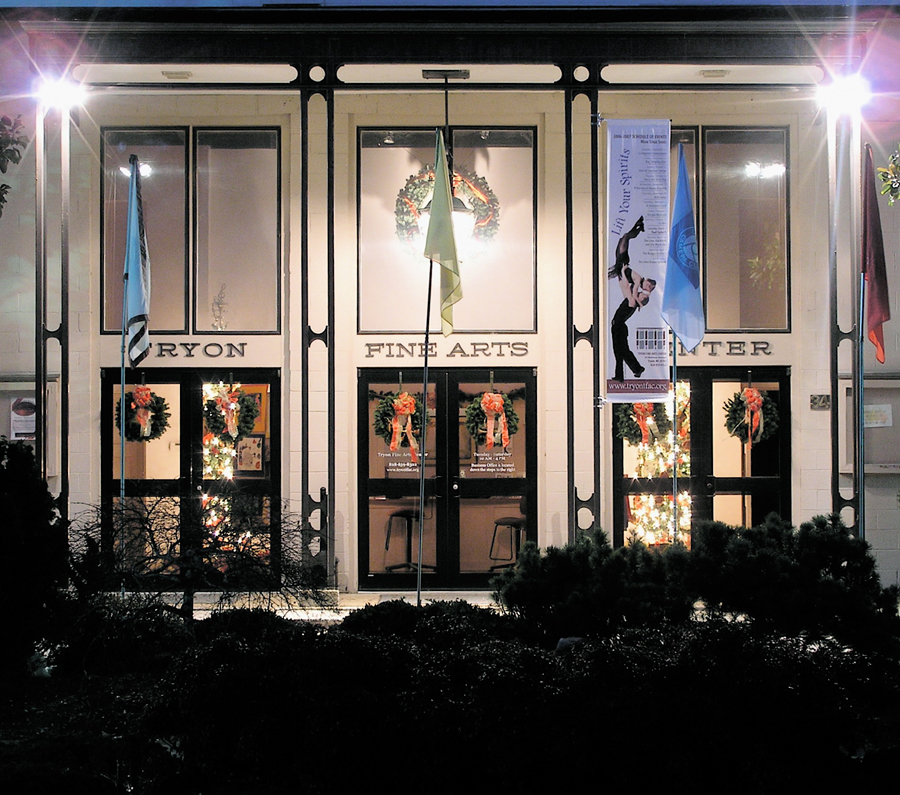
Tryon Fine Arts Center

The Tryon Fine Arts Center, located on Melrose Avenue, is a visual and performing arts center that offers music, drama, film and other cultural programs. Founded in 1969, the non-profit organization also offers a number of classes in the arts. The center's theater seats 345 individuals and has a system for the hearing impaired.

Located, exhibiting, or performing within the center are: the Tryon Painters and Sculptors and the Carolina Photo Club. The Photo Club annually exhibits in January and February. The group, affiliated with the Photographic Society of America, meets monthly. It conducts an annual contest, and winning submissions are exhibited in the Tryon Fine Arts Center.

Tryon Arts and Crafts School

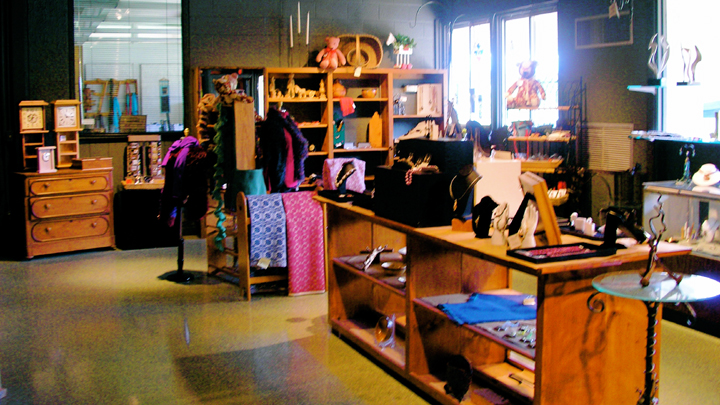
Tryon Arts and Crafts School

Established in 1960, Tryon Arts and Crafts School provides creative opportunities "through education, instruction, and expression of heritage and contemporary arts and crafts." In the 1950s local artists offered space in their homes for fine arts and crafts. The blizzard of 1959 was the impetus for creation of a formal organization. Grace Hall, a local resident who had been trapped in her home for three weeks, wrote to the Tryon Daily Bulletin with an idea: form a local crafts center so that area residents could learn skills for arts or crafts. If another blizzard hit, they would be better prepared for isolation. Many agreed, including architect Carter Brown and Tryon philanthropist Violet Parish-Watson.

In April 1960, 200 area residents pledged a one-dollar membership fee to support what would be called Tryon Crafts, Inc. "Recapturing Tryon's history as an artist's colony," local artisans began selling work and teaching classes. Tryon Arts & Crafts (named since 2004) is now located at 373 Harmon Field Road, adjacent to Harmon Field. The facility offers professional studios for a wide variety of arts, such as fiber arts, pottery, jewelry, lapidary, woodworking, multimedia and blacksmithing.

Tryon Concert Association

The Tryon Concert Association has brought "world-class artists" to Tryon since its first sponsored concert in January 1955, when baritone Robert McFerrin gave a recital. Soon after this performance, McFerrin was the first African American to join the Metropolitan Opera Company of New York City. The Tryon Concert Association provides a series of four concerts from the fall through spring with high quality talent.

Tryon Little Theater

Tryon Little Theater has been a vital part of the performing community since 1948. It performs four productions a year, plus classes and workshops at its Workshop on Highway 176. Auditions are always open to the public. The theater is also a partner in producing the Tryon Summer Youth Theater for ages 12–18.

Tryon Youth Center

Tryon Youth Center, located in a 5,300-square-foot (490 m^{2}) building on US Highway 176, offers artistic, social and recreational programs for area young people. A Youth Center Summer Musical is produced annually at the Tryon Fine Arts Center.

Children's Theatre Festival

Children's Theater Festival, organized in 1978, offers "lively arts" for children including: "Eight to ten different performances, encompassing theater, music, storytelling, mime, dance, puppetry, and more are brought to Tryon on a Saturday in late March."

Nina Simone Birthplace

Tryon is the birthplace of singer and piano player Nina Simone. Four African-American artists: Adam Pendleton, Ellen Gallagher, Rashid Johnson, and Julie Mehretu jointly bought her childhood home to preserve it. The home has been named a national treasure by the National Trust for Historic Preservation. Nina Simone Plaza in downtown Tryon features a bronze sculpture by Zenos Frudakis.

=== Equestrian community ===
Colonel Charles C. Ross, U.S. Army (Retd.) is a local historian and former president of the Tryon Riding and Hunt Club. He said at a Polk County Historical Association meeting in April 2010,

"The horse is all important in Polk County. Horses provide sport, pleasure, entertainment, business, and the good country living. It can be said that horses are a way of life in our pleasant community here in rural North Carolina."

When Carter Brown came to Tryon from Michigan in 1917, he opened the Pine Crest Inn, developing it as a resort for wealthy northerners. They could come here to ride horses or play golf during the winter months. In 1925 Brown founded and was the first president of the Tryon Riding and Hunt Club. Brown also helped organize the Tryon Horse Show and the Block House Steeplechase in 1929 and 1934, respectively.

Ross noted in 2010 that in their heyday, the Tryon Horse Show "was so popular that the schools were let out and most businesses closed for the afternoon." The Tryon Horse Shows are held at the Foothills Equestrian Nature Center (FENCE). In 1956, the US Equestrian Team prepared and trained for the 1956 Olympics in Tryon. The Tryon Horse Show continues to be held; it is the third oldest horse show and a rated United States Equestrian Federation event.

Smaller shows are held at Harmon Field. Many local organizations, such as the Carolina Carriage Club, the Blue Ridge Hunter Jumper Association, Foothills Riding Club, and River Valley Pony Club also hold shows and events.

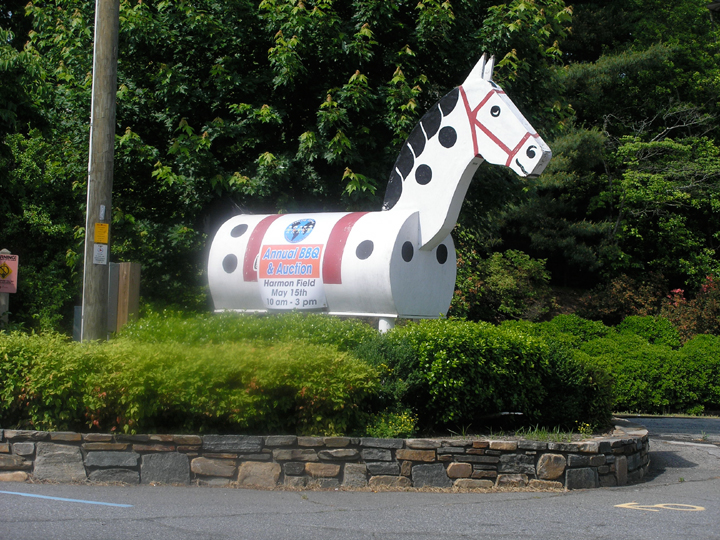
Morris, the town symbol

Morris, the Tryon Horse, stands at the center of Tryon. A large version of toys made by the Tryon Toymakers and Woodcarvers, the Tryon Horse was commissioned in 1928 by the Tryon Riding and Hunt Club. The current Morris is the fifth generation; three of the previous versions succumbed to fire, mischievous kidnapping and age, and the fourth was refurbished with a fiberglass body. Morris serves as a billboard during the Tryon Horse Show and Block House Steeplechase Races. At Christmas, he is decorated with garland and a top hat.

In May 2012, a group of volunteers, together with the Town of Tryon and the Tryon Daily Bulletin (The World's Smallest Daily Newspaper!), banded together to raise money to restore and maintain Morris, which was deteriorating. The enormous statue was "kidnapped" in the dead of night on June 8, 2012, and held for "ransom". The refurbished Morris was returned to his rightful spot in November 2012.

Tryon International Equestrian Center (TIEC)

In June 2014, the $100 million TIEC and Resort opened to host numerous multi-day, international-level equestrian competitions across several disciplines in collaboration with the Tryon Riding and Hunt Club. Located outside Tryon in nearby Mill Spring, the 1400-acre equestrian facility features up to 10 riding arenas (including one with stadium seating for 6,000), 1,000 permanent stalls, elevated and shaded viewing decks, and a large covered riding facility.

In addition, the Tryon Sports Complex on site includes a health club, game room, kids' camp, sports bar, children's playground, tennis courts, mountain bike park, climbing walls, basketball court, and a large pool. A 150-room hotel overlooks the equestrian center. The TIEC hosted the 2018 World Equestrian Games. It was at these games that the horse Barack Obama died.

Foothills Equestrian Nature Center

The Foothills Equestrian Nature Center (FENCE) is a 380-acre (1.5 km^{2}) nature preserve with trails established for hiking, horseback riding, and bird-watching. The center, which also includes picnic areas and a pond, hosts equestrian events and live concerts.

=== Library ===
The Lanier Library Association is named for poet Sidney Lanier. He was living in "the Wilcox house" on Highway 108 in Lynn, three miles (5 km) north of Tryon. He died there on September 7, 1881, and it has since been known as the "Lanier House".

In 1889 five women from Tryon developed the idea for a library to provide "intellectual and cultural stimulation for the community"; they opened library membership to local women. Two volumes of Sidney Lanier's poems, a gift from his wife Mary, were the first books for the library. Initially the books of the library were located at several places in town before the Lanier Library was constructed in 1905; it has been expanded over the years. In 1930 the library established an endowment fund to support its operations. It extended library membership to men. The Lanier Library Association, Inc., previously called the Lanier club, was organized to provide library services and related cultural programs to the community. Lanier Library remains a membership library supported solely by membership dues, endowments and donations. It is one of a few membership libraries in the country.

=== Recreation ===
The area is known for its scenic drives featuring well-kept horse farms, hardwood forests, and Carolina foothills overwhelmed by kudzu.

==== Parks ====
Tryon Parks

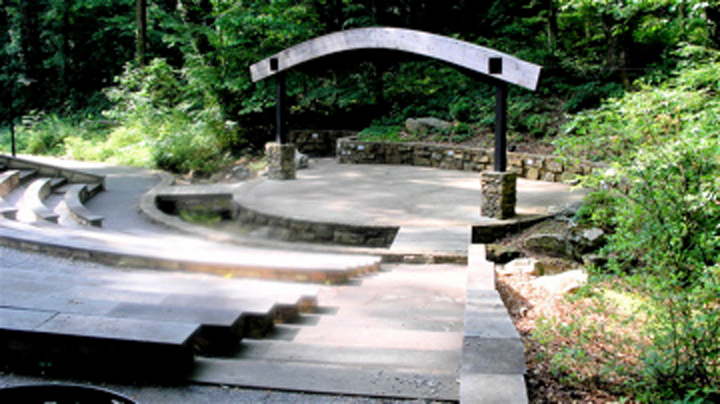
Rogers Park

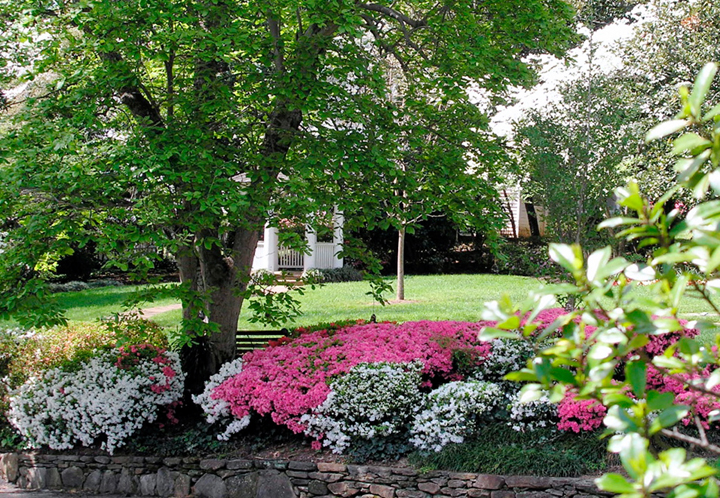
Greene Corner

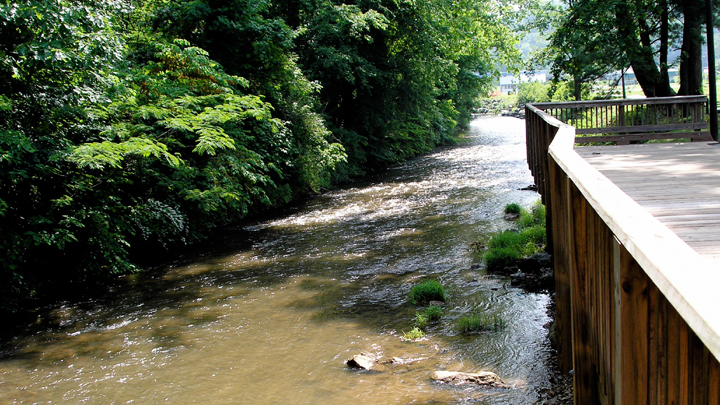
Harmon Field Walkway

Tryon has several parks including:

- Rogers Park, located in downtown Tryon, this facility also has an open-air amphitheater. The natural setting includes a small creek and trails. Landscaping features native plants and Crab Orchard stone walls. Its facilities are used for public events, such as music performances. It can also be reserved for private events, such as weddings and other occasions.
- Greene Corner, on Melrose Avenue across from the entrance to the Tryon Fine Arts Center, has a beautiful garden and gazebo, often a setting for photos. Sassoon Park, also on Melrose Avenue, has a modern sculpture and greenery.
- Harmon Field, a 46-acre (190,000 m^{2}) park in Tryon, located on Harmon Field Road between US Hwy 176 and NC Hwy 108, is regularly used by town residents and visitors. It offers a variety of activities, from trail walking to active sports participation:
  - There are periodic events for horseback riders (see their calendar of events). Facilities include four horse rings and 140 stalls.
  - There are two baseball fields, two soccer fields, four tennis courts, basketball courts, dog park, trails, disc golf course, and a playground.
  - Shelters and grills are available for picnics.
  - The field also offers rental facilities and a concession stand.

==== Scenic areas and drives ====
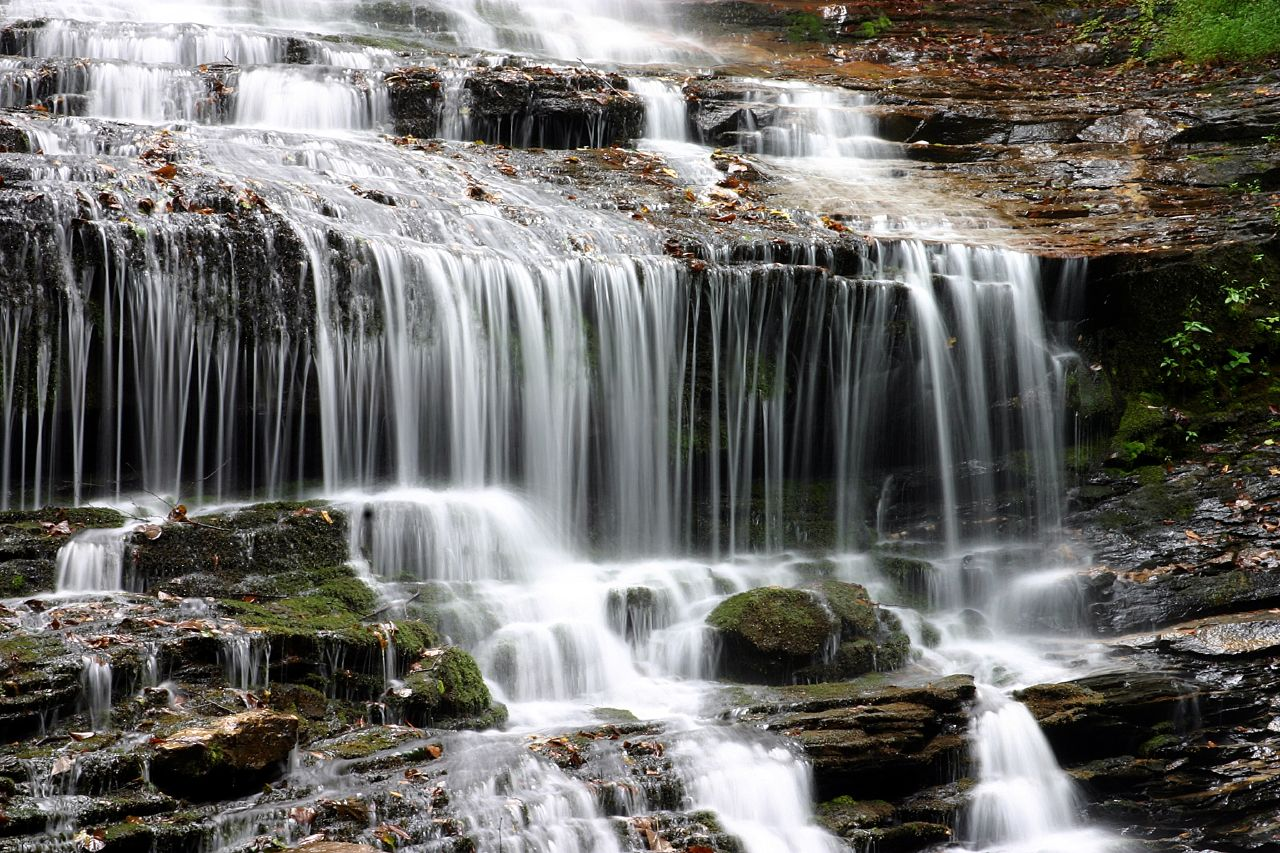
Pearson's Falls off of the Pacolet River, between Tryon and Saluda, North Carolina

- Pacolet Scenic Byway, one of North Carolina Scenic Byways, is a ten-mile (16 km) portion of US 176 that runs from Tryon to Saluda. It provides views of the Pacolet River and waterfalls.
- Pearson's Falls Natural Heritage Site, named for its 90-foot (27 m) waterfall, is owned and maintained by the Tryon Garden Club. Located between Tryon and Saluda, it offers a picnic area, and hiking and biking trails. A one-quarter mile walk to the waterfall can be found from the entrance at US 176. The "botanical preserve" offers more than 200 species of wildflowers and plants. It has been classified as a deciduous climax forest. The falls were named after engineer Charles William Pearson, who surveyed the Blue Ridge Mountains for a route for construction of the Norfolk Southern Railroad.

== Transportation ==
Tryon is located west of Interstate 26, which runs northwest to Asheville and southeast to Spartanburg, South Carolina, approximately one mile from the NC/SC border. U.S. Highway 176 runs through the center of town, where it is known as Trade Street.

== Notable people ==
- George Charles Aid (1872–1938), painter
- Katharine Alexander (1898–1981), actress, died in Tryon
- Margaret Culkin Banning (1891–1982), whose home "Friendly Hills", was listed on the National Register of Historic Places in 1998
- William Behrends (born 1946), sculptor
- Cathy Smith Bowers (born 1949), poet and professor; North Carolina Poet Laureate, 2010–2012
- Ligon Flynn (1931–2010), architect
- Crystal R. Fox (born 1964), actress
- Henry Jacques Garrigues (1831–1913), Danish-born doctor considered to have introduced antiseptic obstetrics to the United States
- William Gillette (1853–1937), Sherlock Holmes actor who built a home in Tryon; this was adapted as the Thousand Pine Inn
- Mary Alice Monroe, author
- Richard Christian Nelson (born 1961), artist
- Mark Schweizer (1956–2019), singer, composer, conductor, author, and publisher, founder of St. James Music Press
- Nina Simone (1933–2003), singer, pianist, composer, and activist
- Amelia Van Buren (1856–1942), photographer
