= Margaret Culkin Banning =

American novelist

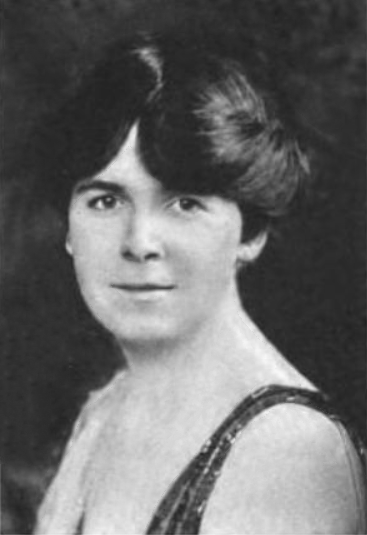
- Born: Margaret Frances Culkin; March 18, 1891; Buffalo, Minnesota, U.S.
- Died: January 4, 1982 (aged 90); Tryon, North Carolina, U.S.
- Education: Vassar College; Russell Sage College; Chicago School of Civics and Philanthropy
- Occupation: Writer
- Father: William Culkin

Margaret Frances Banning (née Culkin; March 18, 1891 – January 4, 1982) was a best-selling American writer of thirty-six novels and an early advocate of women's rights.

== Early life ==
Banning was born in Buffalo, Minnesota on March 18, 1891. She was the daughter of William E. Culkin, who served in the Minnesota Senate from 1895 to 1899, and Hannah Alice Young. Her family moved to Duluth, Minnesota when she was five after President William McKinley appointed her father as Register of the Land Office. Her first poem was published in the local paper when she was seven. She attended local public schools before spending a year at Sacred Heart Academy in Rochester, New York.

She graduated from Vassar College in 1912 with an A.B., where she had been elected to Phi Beta Kappa. She was the editor of the college magazine in her senior year. Banning was inspired by the Irish Revival movement and particularly enjoyed the works of Lady Gregory while studying at the college. She attended Russell Sage College on a fellowship for social work from 1912 to 1913 and then received a certificate from the Chicago School of Civics and Philanthropy in 1914.

== Career ==
Banning moved back to Duluth and worked as a city's social center director and playground supervisor for a year. She married Archibald T. Banning, Jr., a Duluth lawyer, in 1914, and the couple moved overseas. During World War I, her husband was working in Europe while Banning stayed in London, where she worked part-time for the Red Cross and began work on her first novel. After a year, she moved back to the United States. She spent a summer in New York with her children, tutoring with Viola Roseboro, a former editor of McClure's Magazine. Her first novel, Barbara Lives, was published in 1917.

In 1920, This Marrying was bought and published by George H. Doran. Her book was initially advertised alongside works by Stephen Vincent Benet and Elisabeth Sanxay Holding. She was guided in the literary world by Eugene Saxton of Harper & Brothers and Carl Brandt, a literary agent.

She wrote thirty-nine books as well as over 400 short stories and personal essays, many of which were published in magazines such as Good Housekeeping, McCall's, Ladies' Home Journal, The Saturday Evening Post, Atlantic Monthly, Harper's Bazaar, and Reader's Digest. Her work covered issues of social and moral importance, including race relations, birth control, and mixed religion marriages. She continued to keep her husband's name for her writing, even after their divorce in 1930. Banning's last novel, Such Interesting People, was published in 1979. One of her best-known books was Letters to Susan (1936), which was a collection of letters addressed to college women that covered topics such as "drinking, petting, and early marriage".

Banning was a popular public speaker on women's issues and other civic topics. She was a member of the British Information Service in World War II. She traveled to England after World War II to study women's social conditions and then worked in refugee camps in Austria and Germany. Some of her works were republished broadly across Europe, in translation, and appeared in Reader's Digest and other American periodicals. In 1960, she was profiled in the 6th Series of The Book of Catholic Authors, where she wrote her autobiographical essay. The majority of her archives are held at her alma mater, Vassar College, and Boston University.

== Personal life ==
She and Archibald Banning had four children, two of whom survived to adulthood. She was active in philanthropy and served as a volunteer for the Junior League of Duluth, the American Association of University Women, and the League of Women Voters. She was a board member for the Duluth City Symphony and Public Library, as well as a trustee of Vassar College from 1937 to 1945. She purchased the Friendly Hills estate near Tryon, North Carolina in 1936 and enjoyed the property seasonally for the remainder of her life. It was added to the National Register of Historic Places in 1998.

In 1944, she married her second husband, LeRoy Salsich, a mining company executive. Margaret Banning Salsich was a lifelong Republican and Roman Catholic.

She died in Tryon, North Carolina on January 4, 1982. Banning was the first woman admitted to the Duluth Hall of Fame. She was honored by the city on May 21, 1969, which was proclaimed "Margaret Culkin Banning Day".

== Selected works ==
- This Marrying, 1920, George H. Doran Co., New York
- Half Loaves, 1921, Hodder & Stoughton
- Spellbinders, 1922, George H. Doran Co., New York
- Country Club People, 1923, George H. Doran Co., New York
- A Handmaid of the Lord, 1924, Doran, New York
- The Women of the Family, 1926, Harper & Bros., New York, London
- Pressure, 1927, Harper & Brothers
- Money Of Her Own, 1928, Harper & Brothers, New York, London
- Rich Girl, Poor Girl, 1928, Harper & Brothers
- Mixed Marriage, 1930, Harper & Brothers
- Prelude To Love, 1930, Harper & Brothers
- His Side Of It, 1931, Mills & Boon, London
- Path of True Love, 1933, Harper & Brothers
- The Third Son, 1934, Harper & Brothers
- The First Woman, 1935, Harper & Brothers
- Letters to Susan, 1936, Harper & Brothers, New York
- The Iron Will, 1936, Harper & Brothers
- The Case for Chastity, 1937, Harper & Brothers
- You Haven't Changed, 1938, Harper & Brothers
- Too Young To Marry, 1938, Harper & Brothers
- Enough To Live On, 1941, Harper & Brothers
- Salud! A South American Journal 1941, with drawings by Rafaello Busoni, Harper & Brothers
- The Minnesota Arrowhead Country, 1941, Introduction, with the WPA writers, Albert Whitman
- A Week in New York, 1941, Harper & Brothers, 1947, Blakiston, Philadelphia
- Women for Defense, 1942, Duell, Sloan and Pearce, New York
- Letters from England, Summer 1942, 1943, Harper & Brothers
- Conduct Yourself Accordingly, 1944, Harper & Brothers (with her sister, Mabel Louise Culkin)
- The Clever Sister 1950, Dell
- Give Us Our Years, 1950, Harper & Brothers
- Fallen Away, 1951, Harper * Brothers
- A New Design for the Defense Decade, 1951,1952. American Council of Education, Washington.
- The Dowry, 1955, Harper & Brothers
- The Convert 1957, Harper & Brothers
- Echo Answers, 1960, Harper & Brothers, W. H. Allen, London
- The Quality of Mercy 1963, Harper & Row
- The Vine and The Olive, 1964, Harper & Row
- I Took My Love to the Country, 1966, Harper & Row
- Mesabi, 1969, Harper & Row
- Lifeboat Number Two, 1971, Harper & Row
- The Will of Magda Townsend, 1974, Harper & Row, New York, G. K. Hall, Boston, W. H. Allen, London
- The Splendid Torments, 1976, Harper & Row
- Such Interesting People, 1979, Harper & Row
