= William Culkin =

Minnesota state senator

William Edgar Culkin

State senate
- In office January 8, 1895 – January 2, 1899

Personal details
- Committees: Geological and Natural History Survey, chair

William Culkin

Member of the Minnesota State Senate from the 38th district
- In office January 2, 1899 – 1898

Personal details
- Born: William Edgar Culkin; October 15, 1860 Oswego, New York
- Died: June 25, 1949 (aged 88) St. Louis County, Minnesota
- Party: Republican
- Children: 4, including Margaret Culkin Banning
- Occupation: Newspaperman; historian
- Profession: Lawyer

William Edgar Culkin (October 15, 1860 – June 25, 1949) was an American newspaper editor, historian, and educator. He was raised in New York, and later moved to Minnesota, where he served on the Minnesota Senate between 1895 and 1898 as a Republican.

== Early life ==
William Edgar Culkin was born in Oswego, New York, in 1860, where his early schooling took place. He moved to Minnesota in 1880, and he taught there for two years while continuing his studies. Culkin read law and was allowed to practice law from 1882, initially in Waverly, a town in Wright County. He was married in 1886 to Hannah Alice Young, and they soon settled in Buffalo, Minnesota. He and his wife had a son and three daughters. One, Margaret Culkin Banning, became a best selling author.

== Career ==
Culkin was elected three times as county attorney of Wright County, beginning in 1886. He belonged to the Republican Party. Culkin was elected to District 38 of the state senate representing Sherburne and Wright counties during the 29th and 30th State Legislative Sessions, which ran from January 1895 to January 1898. He defeated the Democratic and Populist party candidate, David Murdock. He served on several committees, and was chair of the Geological and Natural History Survey committee. In late 1897, he became the Registrar of the United States Land Office, in Duluth.

== Later life and death ==
Culkin was an associate editor of the Duluth Herald Newspaper early in the twentieth century. He became known as a local historian following his government career, and in 1922 was made the first president of the St. Louis County Historical Society. He died at Duluth in 1949 and is buried in Calvary Cemetery, Duluth, Minnesota.
