= Richard Christian Nelson =

American painter

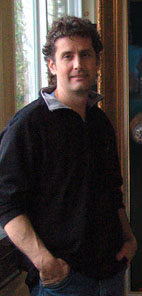
- Born: 1961 (age 64–65); Detroit, Michigan
- Education: College for Creative Studies, Wayne State University
- Known for: Painting

Richard Christian Nelson (born 1961) is a portrait and gallery artist from Tryon, North Carolina. He has won numerous national awards and honors, and created over 1000 commissioned oil and charcoal portraits. He is also known for landscape and still life painting. Nelson maintains a studio in Asheville's River Arts District; 362 Depot.

== Background ==
Born in Detroit, Michigan in 1961, Nelson earned his BFA at Detroit's College for Creative Studies in 1988. He is recognized nationally for his portrait work, and is an established landscape artist and instructor. He has served on the faculty of the Portrait Society Of America, is an active member of PAPSE (Plein Air Painters of the South East) and the Oil Painters Of America. A part of the Detroit music scene in the 1980s, Nelson is an accomplished rock musician. He was a member of notable Detroit bands Bitter Sweet Alley (BSA) and The Purple Gang. He played with Carolina bands the Trophy Husbands, Casual Zealots, and 176, and started the Rich Nelson Band in 2018.

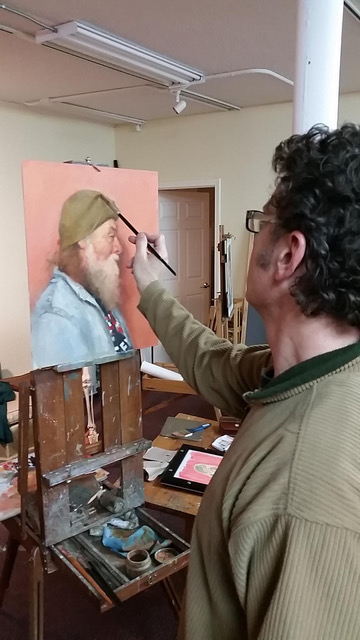
Rich Painting Ray

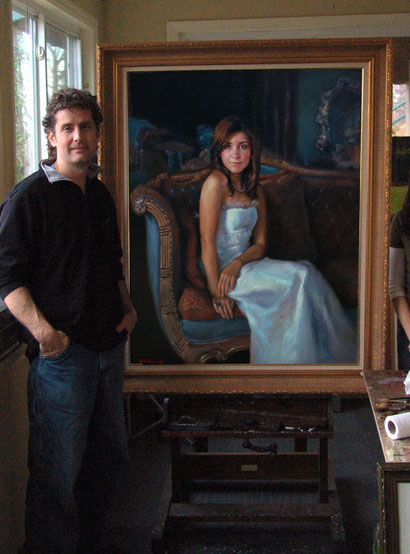
Richard Christian Nelson

== Life and work ==
The Portrait Society of America has recognized Nelson's portrait work with fourteen awards. Among his notable commissions are portraits of former General Motors Chairmen John F. Smith, Jr. and Edward Whitacre, Jr., noted heart surgeon Randolph Chitwood, Medal of Honor recipient Bryant H. Womack, and Federal Judge Malcolm Jones Howard.

== Awards ==
- 2019- 'Jim Jackson' Certificate Of Merit- Portrait Society Of America's International Portrait Competition
- 2017- 'Emelie' accepted into Oil Painters Of America Salon
- 2017- 'Jodie Karr' accepted into the Oil Painters of America Eastern Regional Exhibition*2017- ‘Emelie’ accepted into Oil Painters Of America Salon
- 2016- Granted signature status from the Portrait Society Of America
- 2016- 'Lily Outdoors' accepted into Oil Painters Of America National Juried Exhibition
- 2014 - Certificate Of Excellence - Portrait Society Of America's 2014 International Portrait Competition
- 2014- Certificate Of Excellence - Portrait Society Of America's 2014 International Portrait Competition
- 2013- Finalist - Portrait Society Of America's 2013 International Portrait Competition
- 2012- Certificate Of Excellence - Portrait Society Of America's 2012 International Portrait Competition
- 2012- 1st Place- Commissioned Portraits- Portrait Society Of America's Member's Only Competition
- 2010- Finalist- Portrait/Figure Category of The Artist's Magazine 27th Annual Art Competition
- 2009- 1st Place- Oil and Honorable Mention-Drawing- Portrait Society Of America's 'Choose Your Medium' Portrait Competition
- 2008 - 2nd Place- Portrait Society Of America's ‘Outdoor’ Portrait Competition
- 2007 - Semifinalist In American Artist Magazine's 70th Anniversary Competition
- 2007 - Honorable Mention - Portrait Society Of America's Children's Portrait Competition
- 2006 - Honorable Mention - Portrait Society Of America's Self - Portrait Competition
- 2006 - 2nd Place and People's Choice - Portrait Society Of America's Tri - State Competition
- 2005 - Certificate Of Merit - Portrait Society Of America's Annual Portrait Competition
- 2004 - Best Portfolio - Portrait Society Of America's Annual Conference
- 2003 - Best Portfolio - Portrait Society Of America's Annual Conference
- 2002 - Certificate of Merit - Portrait Society Of America's Annual Portrait Competition
- 2001 - Certificate of Merit - Portrait Society Of America's Annual Portrait Competition
