= The Baritone Wore Chiffon =

2004 novel by Mark Schweizer

- First edition
- Author: Mark Schweizer
- Language: English
- Series: St. Germaine
- Genre: Mystery novel
- Publisher: St. James Music Press
- Publication date: February 2004
- Publication place: United States
- Media type: Print (paperback)
- Pages: 204 pp (first edition, paperback)
- ISBN: 0-9721211-3-7 (first edition, paperback)
- OCLC: 55017142
- Preceded by: The Alto Wore Tweed
- Followed by: The Tenor Wore Tapshoes

The Baritone Wore Chiffon is the second book in Mark Schweizer's St. Germaine mystery series.

In this book, Hayden Koenig travels to York, England, where he investigates the death of a bearded woman and the theft of a jewel.
