= The Alto Wore Tweed =

2002 novel by Mark Schweizer

- First edition cover
- Author: Mark Schweizer
- Language: English
- Series: St. Germaine
- Genre: Mystery
- Publisher: St James Music Press
- Publication date: July 2002
- Publication place: United States
- Media type: Print (paperback)
- ISBN: 0-9721211-0-2 (first edition, paperback)
- OCLC: 60267502
- Followed by: The Baritone Wore Chiffon

The Alto Wore Tweed is the first novel in the St. Germaine mystery series by Mark Schweizer.

In this book, Hayden Koenig investigates the murder of a janitor found in the choirloft.

Alice B. Story of The Town Talk described it as "a kind of two-plotted plot much like a play-within-a-play."
