= Waverly, Minnesota =

City in Minnesota, United States

Waverly
- City
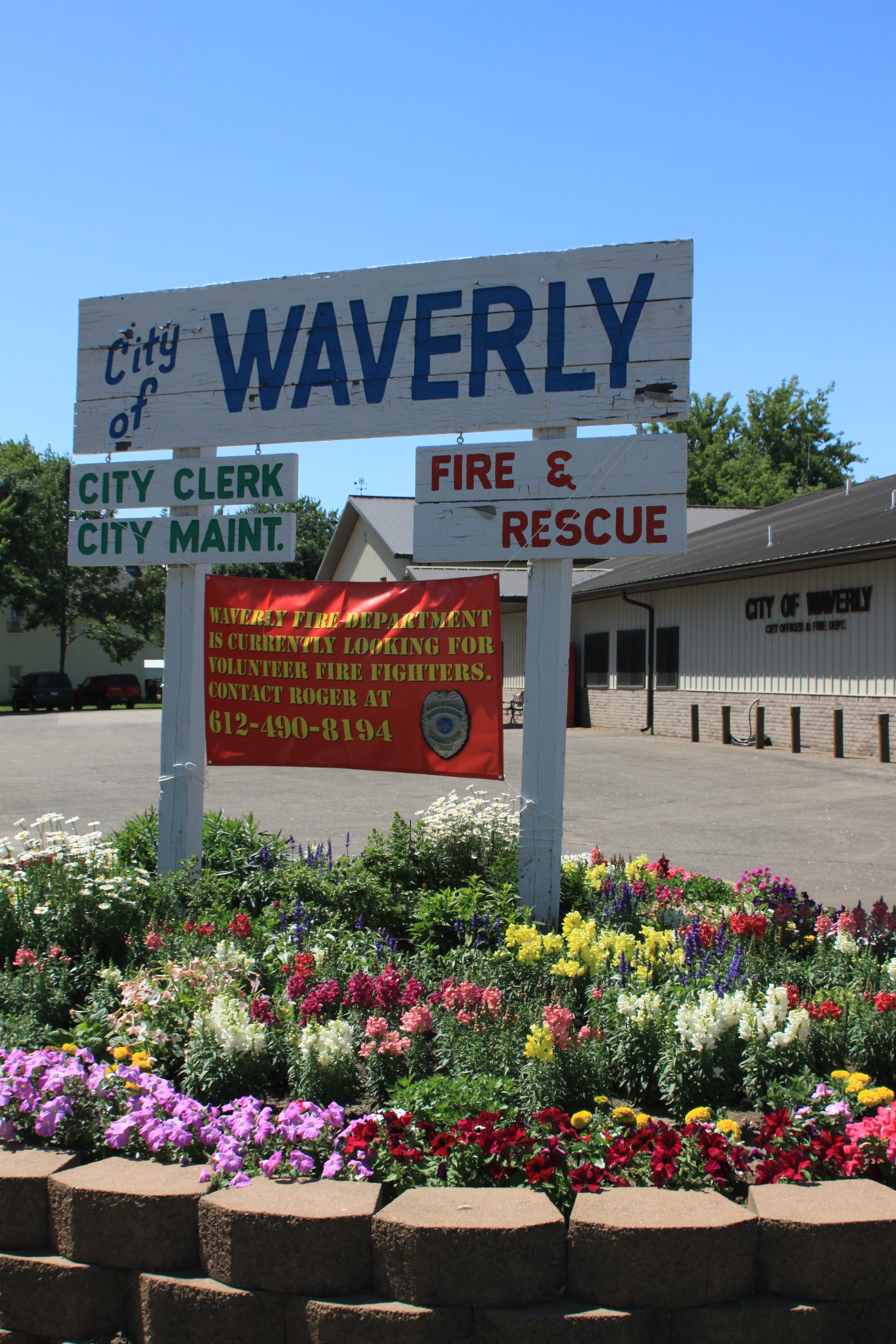
- Motto: A rich past and a bright tomorrow
- Location of the city of Waverly within Wright County, Minnesota
- Coordinates: 45°4′3″N 93°58′4″W
- Country: United States
- State: Minnesota
- County: Wright
- Named for: Waverly, New York

Government
  - Mayor: Connie Holmes

Area
  - Total: 2.53 sq mi (6.56 km^{2})
  - Land: 1.66 sq mi (4.29 km^{2})
  - Water: 0.88 sq mi (2.27 km^{2})
- Elevation: 1,007 ft (307 m)

Population (2020)
  - Total: 1,900
  - Density: 1,146.3/sq mi (442.59/km^{2})
- Time zone: UTC-6 (Central (CST))
  - Summer (DST): UTC-5 (CDT)
- ZIP code: 55390
- Area code: 763
- FIPS code: 27-68764
- GNIS feature ID: 0653859
- Website: https://waverlymn.gov/

Waverly is a city in Wright County, Minnesota, United States. The population was 1,900 at the 2020 census.

== History ==
The framework for the City of Waverly began in 1855, when the territorial legislature passed an act organizing Wright County. Shortly thereafter, the government sent out a survey team to plot the county's divisions. The surveyors were greeted by established homesteaders who had already begun clearing the land and planting crops. Before European settlement, Waverly was predominantly Big Woods, with a mixture of oak, maple, basswood and hickory. Small portions of wet prairie existed on Waverly Lake's eastern edge and along the western edge of present-day CSAH 8.

Impressed by the two lakes (Waverly and Little Waverly), available water power and the proximity of the Crow River, an entrepreneurial surveyor and his partners constructed a dam, sawmill, and grist mill in 1856 at the outlet of Little Waverly Lake. The settlement known as Waverly Mills began to take shape as approximately 300 acres were surveyed and platted. Waverly Mills's name came from a community in Tioga County, New York, the former home of one of the partners. After a rough start with a bank panic, financial crash, and grasshopper infestations, Waverly Mills survived. Its milling industry helped establish a store, post office, and log church with a cemetery at this location.

The village was formerly called Waverly Station to distinguish it from Old Waverly, a pioneer village that had flourished about a mile away. Waverly Station was laid out by the railroad company on its land in the southwest quarter of section 33 around the time regular trains began operating there in 1868. A railroad station was erected that year, and a grain house in 1869. The first store was opened by T. R. Barrett, who operated it for a few years, then changed it to a hotel called the Keystone House.

Among the local lodges in the early 1900s were the Knights of Columbus, the Catholic Order of Foresters, the Modern Woodmen of America, the Modern Brotherhood of America, the Ancient Order of United Workmen, and the Royal Neighbors of America.

The school that once stood where Humphrey Elementary now stands was built in 1905 out of brick. It was two stories high, with a basement, and run by four teachers. In addition to a standard curriculum, the school taught manual training and music.

Waverly Station was incorporated as a village in 1881; it was reincorporated as Waverly in 1885. The following notation appears in the county records: "March 16, 1885. A special election called by the trustees of the village of Waverly for the purpose of ascertaining by ballot whether the village of Waverly should continue as the incorporated under a special act of the legislature or become reincorporated under the General Statute of Minnesota, was held on Monday, March 16, 1885. Due notice of said election having been given and the object of said election having been fully set forth in notices, polls opened at 10 a. m. and closed at 4 p. m. Number of votes polled, 41; for reincorporation, 41; against, none. The village of Waverly was therefore declared reincorporated under the General Statutes of Minnesota and same recorded in the village records."

Waverly's prosperity in its early days was due to both railroad traffic and patronage of the settlers in nearby Woodland and Marysville Townships. Many of these early farmers hailed from various parts of the U.S., French Canada, Sweden, Ireland, Germany, Prussia, Austria, and Switzerland. They supported Waverly's many institutions, including a post office, bank, newspapers, city hall, churches, creamery, school, grain elevators, flouring mills, saw mill, insurance agencies, hotels, livery stables, general stores, hardware dealers, furniture shops, lumber companies, bakery, meat markets, millinery shops, saloons, and a drugstore.

Waverly moved faster and progressed farther in 30 years than some of its rival communities. Some say that Waverly's businesses and buildings were some of Wright County's largest and finest at their height of development. According to one historical account, Waverly was "a pleasant, prosperous village, located on one of the very pleasant lakes; it is quite a summer resort for pleasure seekers". Records indicate that by 1909, its population had grown to over 1,000.

Since its incorporation, Waverly has changed both physically and demographically. Like many similar rural Minnesota communities, Waverly has felt the socioeconomic effects of industrialized agriculture, with an exodus of young residents to regional urban cores and an aging population. Waverly hosted some small development in the 1930s and '40s and a small subdivision in the early 1960s. But by 1980, its population had decreased to 470. Direct results of this rural trend were merging, consolidating, and vanishing institutions and businesses.

Researchers have found that small communities like Waverly are entering a period of transition and metamorphosis. The grain elevators that once identified Waverly are gone, and new residential housing developments have appeared. The Twin Cities metropolitan area, once seemingly distant, is a 40-minute drive away.

From 2000 to 2007, Waverly attracted a flurry of attention from residential developers. The influx of new residents during this period recalled Waverly's historical boom period before 1900. But this time, the growth was primarily housing. Several developments were platted, including Summerfields, Woodland Shores, Spring Meadows, Carrigan Meadows, Carrigan Estates, and Windgate at Carrigan Lake. The population increased by over 60% from 2000 to nearly 1,300 in 2010 after many decades without growth. Waverly is now poised for continued growth while maintaining its small-town appeal.

The Waverly Village Hall, built in 1939, is listed on the National Register of Historic Places.

== Geography ==
According to the United States Census Bureau, the city has an area of 2.55 square miles (6.60 km^{2}); 1.69 square miles (4.38 km^{2}) is land and 0.86 square miles (2.23 km^{2}) is water.

U.S. Highway 12 serves as a main route in the community.

== Demographics ==
Historical population
Census	Pop.	Note	%±
1880	124		—
1890	370		198.4%
1900	542		46.5%
1910	460		−15.1%
1920	418		−9.1%
1930	458		9.6%
1940	458		0.0%
1950	493		7.6%
1960	574		16.4%
1970	573		−0.2%
1980	470		−18.0%
1990	600		27.7%
2000	732		22.0%
2010	1,357		85.4%
2020	1,900		40.0%
U.S. Decennial Census

=== 2020 census ===
As of the 2020 census, Waverly had a population of 1,900. The median age was 33.9 years. 28.6% of residents were under the age of 18 and 9.7% of residents were 65 years of age or older. For every 100 females there were 117.4 males, and for every 100 females age 18 and over there were 117.1 males age 18 and over.

84.7% of residents lived in urban areas, while 15.3% lived in rural areas.

There were 669 households in Waverly, of which 40.4% had children under the age of 18 living in them. Of all households, 54.9% were married-couple households, 19.6% were households with a male householder and no spouse or partner present, and 13.0% were households with a female householder and no spouse or partner present. About 22.4% of all households were made up of individuals and 7.4% had someone living alone who was 65 years of age or older.

There were 751 housing units, of which 10.9% were vacant. The homeowner vacancy rate was 2.8% and the rental vacancy rate was 3.2%.

Racial composition as of the 2020 census
Race	Number	Percent
White	1,706	89.8%
Black or African American	23	1.2%
American Indian and Alaska Native	14	0.7%
Asian	12	0.6%
Native Hawaiian and Other Pacific Islander	0	0.0%
Some other race	24	1.3%
Two or more races	121	6.4%
Hispanic or Latino (of any race)	64	3.4%

=== 2010 census ===
As of the census of 2010, there were 1,357 people, 520 households, and 357 families residing in the city. The population density was 803.0 inhabitants per square mile (310.0/km^{2}). There were 603 housing units at an average density of 356.8 units per square mile (137.8 units/km^{2}). The racial makeup of the city was 97.3% White, 0.5% African American, 0.4% Native American, 0.8% Asian, 0.1% from other races, and 1.0% from two or more races. Hispanic or Latino of any race were 1.3% of the population.

There were 520 households, of which 37.1% had children under the age of 18 living with them, 56.2% were married couples living together, 7.1% had a female householder with no husband present, 5.4% had a male householder with no wife present, and 31.3% were non-families. 24.0% of all households were made up of individuals, and 6.1% had someone living alone who was 65 years of age or older. The average household size was 2.53 and the average family size was 3.03.

The median age in the city was 31.6 years. 26.6% of residents were under the age of 18; 7.6% were between the ages of 18 and 24; 37.6% were from 25 to 44; 20.1% were from 45 to 64; and 8.2% were 65 years of age or older. The gender makeup of the city was 53.7% male and 46.3% female.

== Politics ==
Presidential election results

2020 Precinct Results Spreadsheet2016 Precinct Results Spreadsheet2012 Precinct Results Spreadsheet2008 Precinct Results Spreadsheet2004 Precinct Results Spreadsheet2000 Precinct Results Spreadsheet1996 Precinct Results1992 Precinct Results1988 Precinct Results1984 Precinct Results1980 Precinct Results1976 Precinct Results1968 Precinct Results1964 Precinct Results1960 Precinct Results
Year	Republican	Democratic	Third parties
2020	64.1% 687	32.9% 353	3.0% 32
2016	64.7% 482	26.4% 197	8.9% 66
2012	59.5% 429	38.3% 276	2.2% 16
2008	58.4% 393	39.4% 265	2.2% 15
2004	58.7% 298	39.0% 198	2.3% 12
2000	45.7% 171	43.9% 164	10.4% 39
1996	31.1% 102	50.9% 167	18.0% 59
1992	24.4% 76	45.4% 141	30.2% 94
1988	36.7% 90	63.3% 155	0.0% 0
1984	40.7% 121	59.3% 176	0.0% 0
1980	32.3% 84	60.0% 156	7.7% 20
1976	21.8% 49	76.0% 171	2.2% 5
1968	11.8% 30	84.3% 214	3.9% 10
1964	16.7% 42	83.3% 210	0.0% 0
1960	19.7% 51	70.9% 207	0.4% 1

== Notable people ==
- Dick Borrell, Minnesota state representative, educator, and businessman
- William Culkin, Minnesota state senator and historian.
- Hubert Humphrey, the 38th Vice President of the United States. In 1958 Humphrey and his wife built a lakefront home in Waverly; it served as his primary residence for the rest of his life, and he died there in 1978. Waverly's elementary school is named after Humphrey.
- Reuben G. Soderstrom, president of the Illinois State Federation of Labor and Illinois AFL-CIO from 1930 to 1970. Soderstrom was born to Swedish immigrants on a small farm west of Waverly.
