= Knapp, Minnesota =

Unincorporated community in Minnesota, United States

Knapp
- Unincorporated community
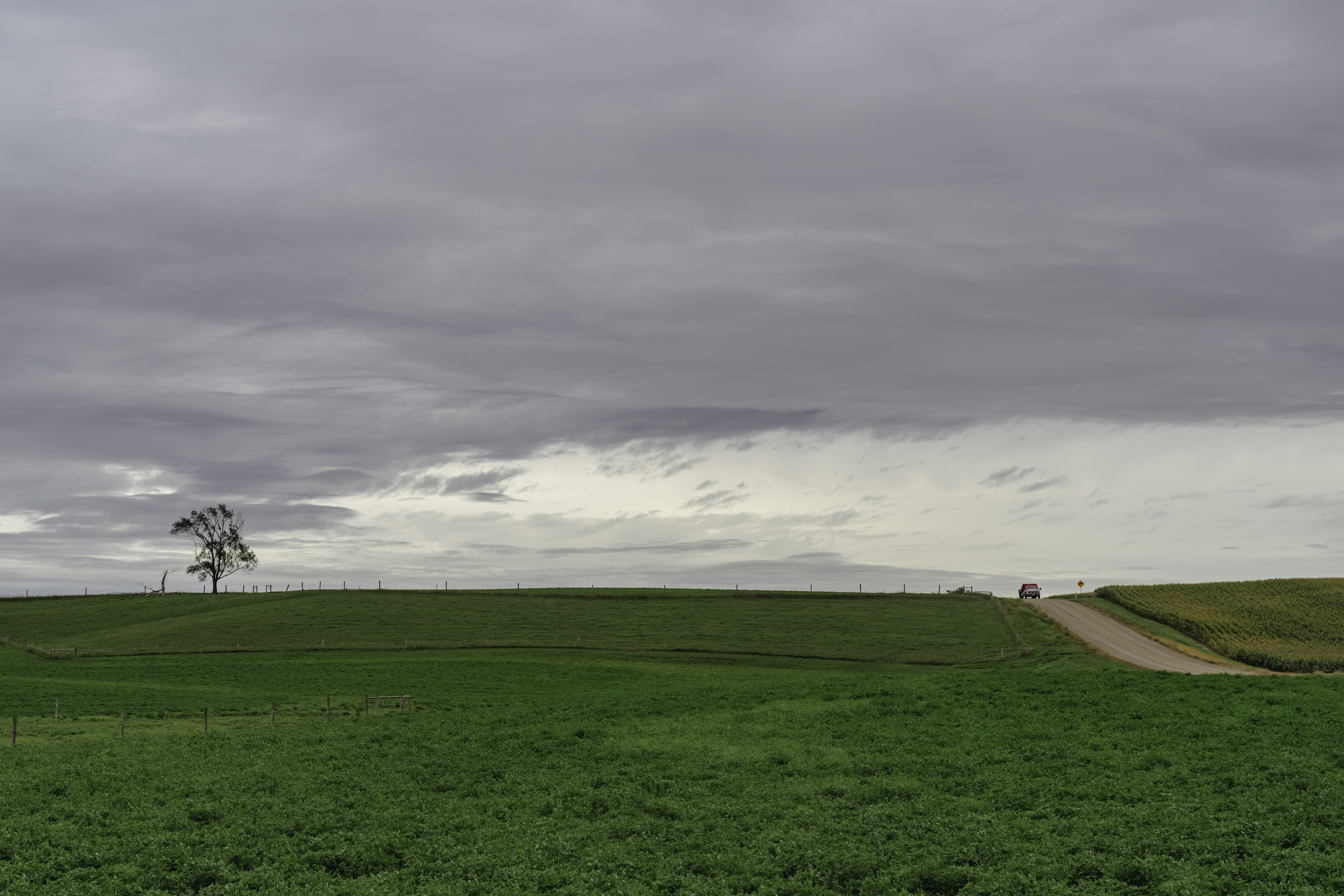
- A tree and country road in Knapp, MN

- Location within Minnesota Location within the United States
- Coordinates: 45°09′08″N 94°13′35″W
- Country: United States
- State: Minnesota
- County: Wright
- Township: Cokato Township and French Lake Township
- Elevation: 1,027 ft (313 m)
- Time zone: UTC-6 (Central (CST))
  - Summer (DST): UTC-5 (CDT)
- ZIP code: 55321
- Area code: 320
- GNIS feature ID: 646196

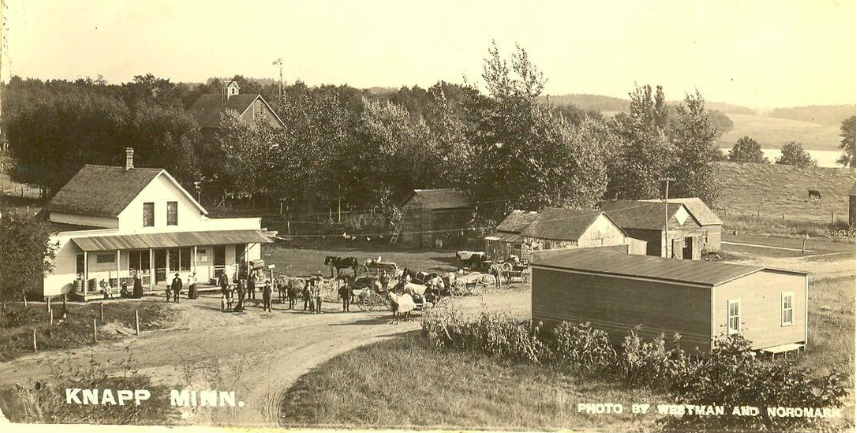
Knapp, MN 1910

Knapp is an unincorporated community in Wright County, Minnesota, United States. The community is located along Wright County Road 35 (Division Street) near Quinnell Avenue SW.

Knapp is located within Cokato Township and French Lake Township. Nearby places include Cokato, Kingston, Annandale, and Knapp Wildlife Management Area.
