= West Albion, Minnesota =

Unincorporated community in Minnesota, United States

West Albion
- Unincorporated community
- Location within Minnesota Location within the United States
- Coordinates: 45°11′45″N 94°08′06″W
- Country: United States
- State: Minnesota
- County: Wright
- Township: Albion Township and French Lake Township
- Elevation: 1,027 ft (313 m)
- Time zone: UTC-6 (Central (CST))
  - Summer (DST): UTC-5 (CDT)
- ZIP code: 55302
- Area code: 320
- GNIS feature ID: 653923

West Albion is an unincorporated community in Wright County, Minnesota, United States. The community is located along Mitchell Avenue near Wright County Road 37.

West Albion is located within Albion Township and French Lake Township. Nearby places include Annandale, Albion Center, and Maple Lake. Wright County Road 5 is also in the immediate area.

Founded sometime during the early 1900s when the store and creamery were built. The community had a store, creamery, and possibly a garage. In 2004, the creamery was torn down. Now, a small community surrounds the old townsite.
