= French Lake, Minnesota =

Unincorporated community in Minnesota, United States

French Lake
- Unincorporated community
- Location within Minnesota Location within the United States
- Coordinates: 45°12′00″N 94°11′08″W
- Country: United States
- State: Minnesota
- County: Wright
- Township: French Lake Township
- Elevation: 1,060 ft (320 m)
- Time zone: UTC-6 (Central (CST))
  - Summer (DST): UTC-5 (CDT)
- ZIP code: 55302
- Area code: 320
- GNIS feature ID: 643940

French Lake is an unincorporated community in French Lake Township, Wright County, Minnesota, United States, near Annandale and Cokato. The community is located near the junction of Wright County Roads 3 and 37.

History

Many settlers traveled along the Territorial Road on their way from Monticello to Forest City and to points beyond. Few stayed in the area. Thus was the plan for Belgian immigrant Ernest Howard. According to D.J. French's early history of Wright County, Howard and his family were on their way to Forest City driving a team and wagon rented in Monticello. Along the way the wagon broke down. The family was left stranded without shelter or much food.

More settlers arrived in the area in the late 1850s when the St. Paul, Minneapolis, and Manitoba Railroad ran a line just south of French Lake. During the Dakota Uprising of 1862, the site was nearly deserted, with residents seeking shelter in Monticello, still others went to the Twin Cities and never returned.

In the early 1900s, French Lake was a bustling community and included a creamery, bank, blacksmith, barber, store, a school with two teachers, a church, flour and saw mills, and a temperance hall. A post office operated from 1860 until 1903, and was established four times within that time frame.
