= Barberg–Selvälä–Salmonson Sauna =

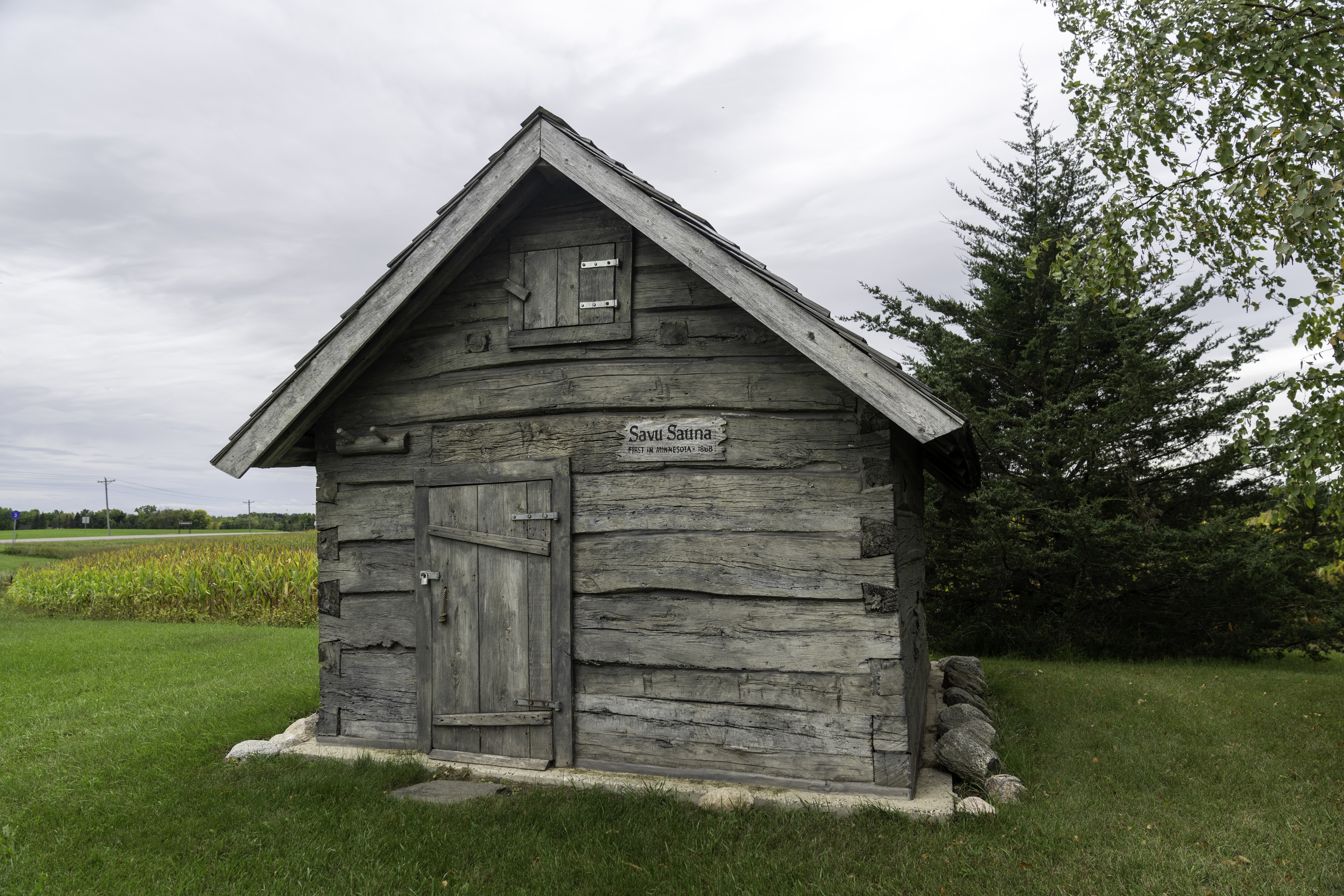
- The Barberg–Selvälä–Salmonson Sauna building

- Location within Minnesota

General information
- Type: Finnish sauna
- Location: Finnish Pioneer Park, Cokato Township, Minnesota, United States
- Coordinates: 45°7′22.4″N 94°11′42.4″W
- Construction started: 1868

The Barberg–Selvälä–Salmonson Sauna is a historic Finnish sauna in Cokato Township, Minnesota, United States. Built in 1868, it is believed to be the state's and probably the nation's oldest surviving savusauna (smoke sauna). Moved on several occasions throughout its history, the sauna now stands with other historical Finnish American structures in a rural park.

== History ==
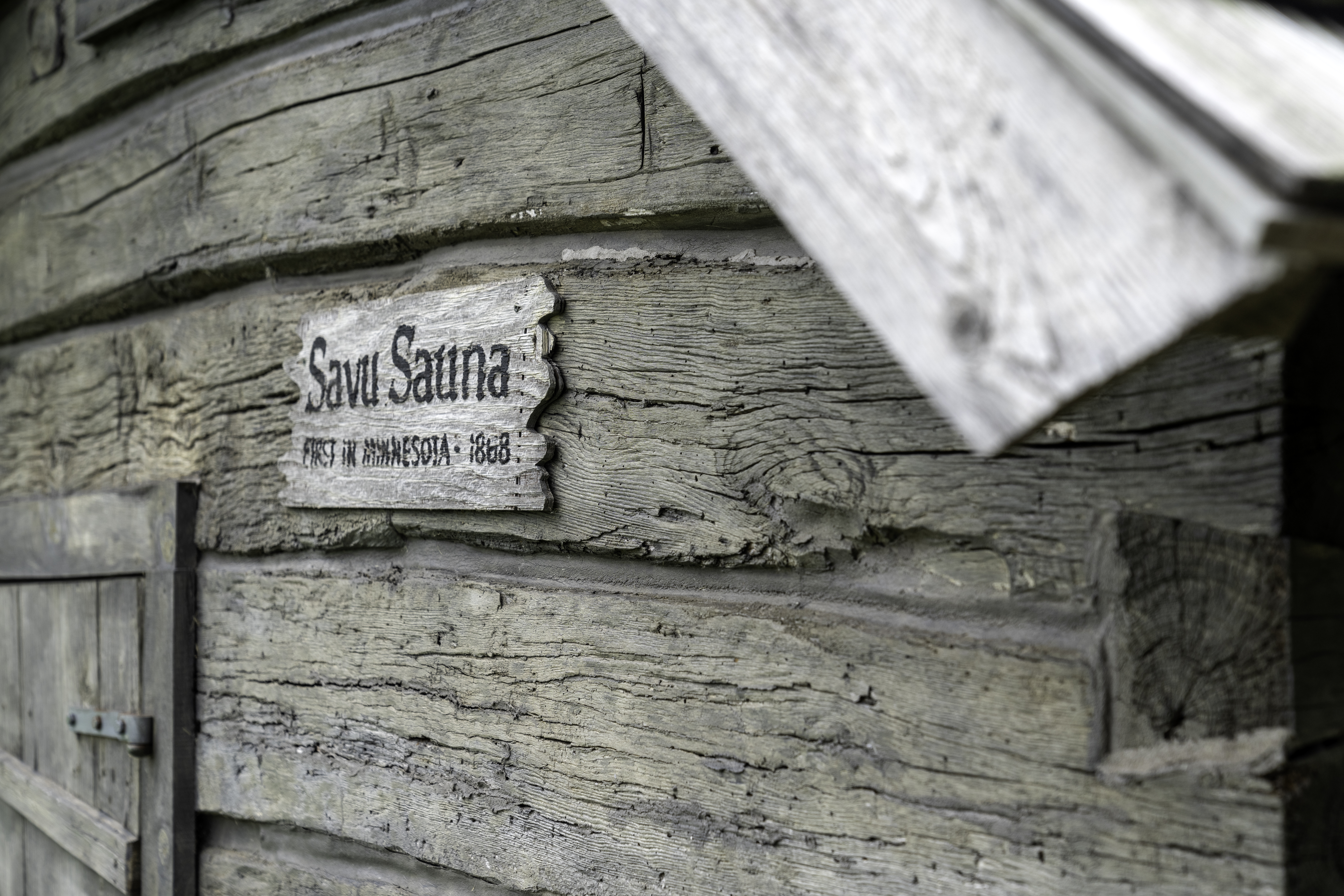
Savu Sauna sign on the Barberg–Selvälä–Salmonson Sauna

Sauna had been practiced for centuries in Finland, and Finnish immigrants to the United States in the late nineteenth and early twentieth centuries did not want to leave sauna behind. Often the first structure they built on their new rural property was a sauna, which they could live and bathe in while they built their other farm buildings. That was the case with the Barberg–Selvälä–Salmonson Sauna.

Finns first came to the Cokato area in 1865, looking for available farmland. Three Finnish families—the Barbergs (also known as the Barbas), Selväläs, and Salmonsons—were among the town's earliest settlers, moving onto their adjoining homesteads by 1868. That year, the families agreed to build a shared savusauna along the property line between the Barberg and Selvälä farms.

Traditionally sauna occurred at least once a week, often on Saturday nights, throughout the year. The simple savusauna was a wood building with a hearth inside. The hearth was covered with rocks that could be heated to great temperatures. Also inside was a wooden platform for bathers to sit or lie on, near the roof to maximize the savusauna's heat. Steps and a lower bench were available for those who did not want the maximum temperature. A fire burned in the savusauna's hearth during the day and then was put out, allowing the smoke in the sauna to dissipate before bathing. The hearth's heated rocks kept the sauna warm for hours after the fire was put out and provided heat for the bathing that followed.

Sauna users like the Barbergs, Selväläs, and Salmonsons sat in the structure long enough to sweat and then cooled off by going outside or rinsing with cold water or snow, if available. They would repeat the process as needed. Bathers also used whisks made of flexible birch branches to beat and stimulate the skin, which caused cleansing through exfoliation.

Non-Finns in Cokato and elsewhere were unfamiliar with sauna. They did not know what their Finnish neighbors were doing in sauna buildings, which looked to them like strange little huts, and there was great speculation. Adding to the controversy was the standard practice of taking sauna and cooling off naked, often outside in the air if the sauna did not have a separate dressing room, which many early Minnesota savusaunas did not. The Barberg-Selvälä-Salmonson sauna was one of these, so the families cooled themselves in the fresh air, naked. This was fine when their property was remote, but it caused quite a stir as Cokato grew and one of the major town roads was laid out along the Barberg-Selvala property line, right next to the sauna.

In 1885 the controversy over the Barberg–Selvälä–Salmonson sauna went to court. Members of the community accused the Selvälä family, who had bought the Barberg and Salmonson families out of their shares of the sauna by then, of strange religious or other practices related to their sauna use. The Selväläs proved to the court that they were upstanding citizens and good Lutherans, and that they were just using the sauna to get clean; they won $30 in damages for the accusations made against them. However the Selväläs were ordered by the court to move their sauna to a more private location on their property, away from the road. They were given an additional $40 to do so. Nils Selvälä moved the sauna, but used it from then on as a shed, taking the money his family had won in court to build a bigger, nicer sauna elsewhere on their property.

In 1979 the original 1868 savusauna, which had been moved a number of times since the 1880s, was moved one last time to Cokato's Temperance Corner, named for the Cokato Temperance Hall that has stood there since 1896. The original savusauna became one of a group of buildings celebrating the Finnish heritage of many in the region, and now it is cared for by the Cokato Finnish American Historical Society. In 2008 the savusauna was repaired and fully restored to its original appearance.
