= Cokato =

Cokato can refer to a community in the United States:

- Cokato, Minnesota
- Cokato Township, Minnesota
