= Albion Center, Minnesota =

Unincorporated community in Minnesota, United States

Albion Center
- Unincorporated community
- Location within Minnesota Location within the United States
- Coordinates: 45°10′37″N 94°04′25″W
- Country: United States
- State: Minnesota
- County: Wright
- Township: Albion Township
- Elevation: 1,083 ft (330 m)
- Time zone: UTC-6 (Central (CST))
  - Summer (DST): UTC-5 (CDT)
- ZIP code: 55302
- Area code: 320
- GNIS feature ID: 639254

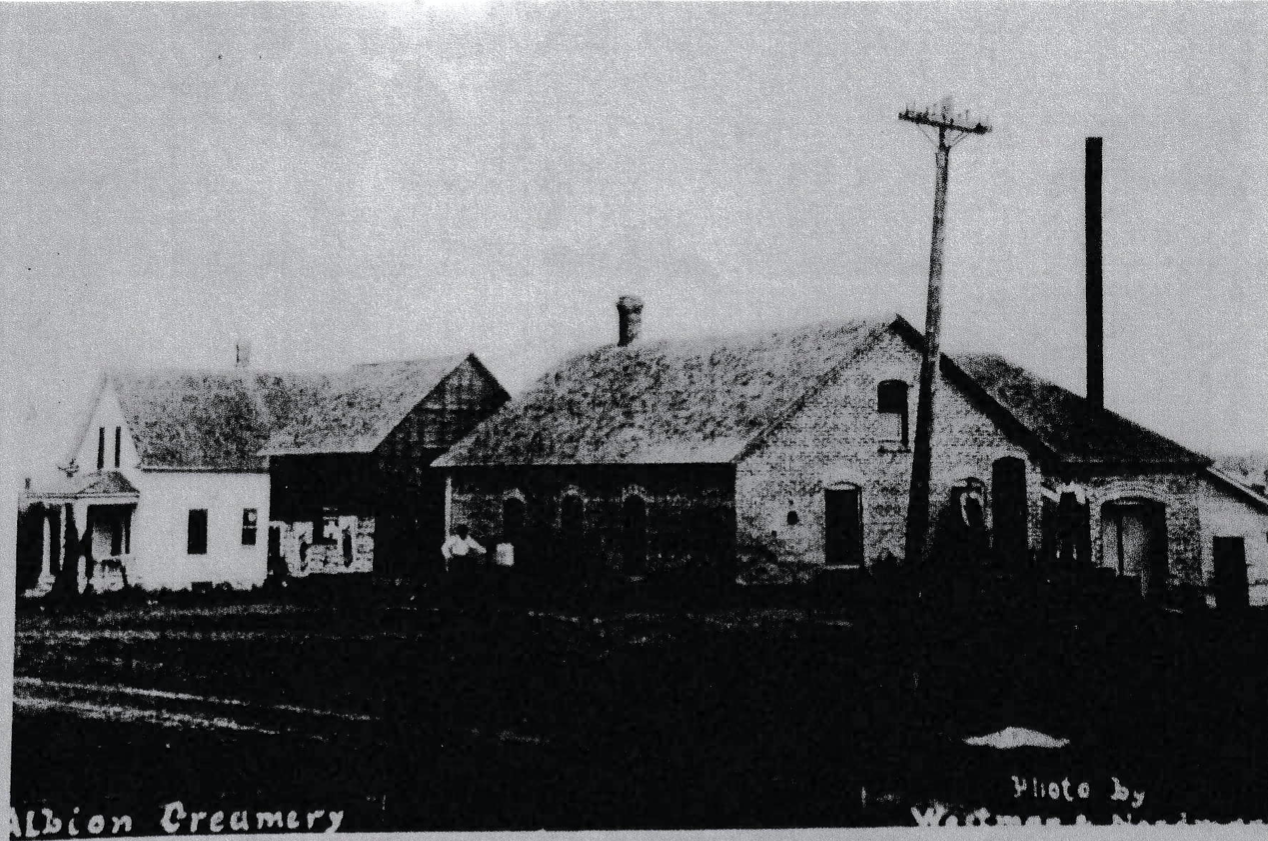
Albion Street Scene, 1910

Albion Center is an unincorporated community in Albion Township, Wright County, Minnesota, United States. The community is located along Wright County Road 6 near 20th Street NW. Nearby places include Annandale, Maple Lake, West Albion, and Albion Wildlife Management Area. Wright County Roads 5, 7, and 37 are also in the immediate area.

== History ==
From the very beginning to the very end, the three Holmes brothers were the mainstay of Albion. Platted in 1856, lots were quickly sold and bills were introduced into the Minnesota Legislature (in 1857 and 1858) to incorporate the small community. For reasons unknown, the town never took off, and incorporation couldn't save it. The brothers never abandoned the town. They continued to stock some store goods for the convenience of area residents and also managed the post office and a half-way house. When the area experienced a ginseng boom, Albion served as the trade center. During the Dakota Uprising, most area settlers fled to Monticello. A few rode out the scare with the Holmes brothers in Albion. The area eventually reverted to farmland.
