= St. Mark's Episcopal Chapel (Corinna Township, Minnesota) =

Historic church in Minnesota, United States

- U.S. National Register of Historic Places
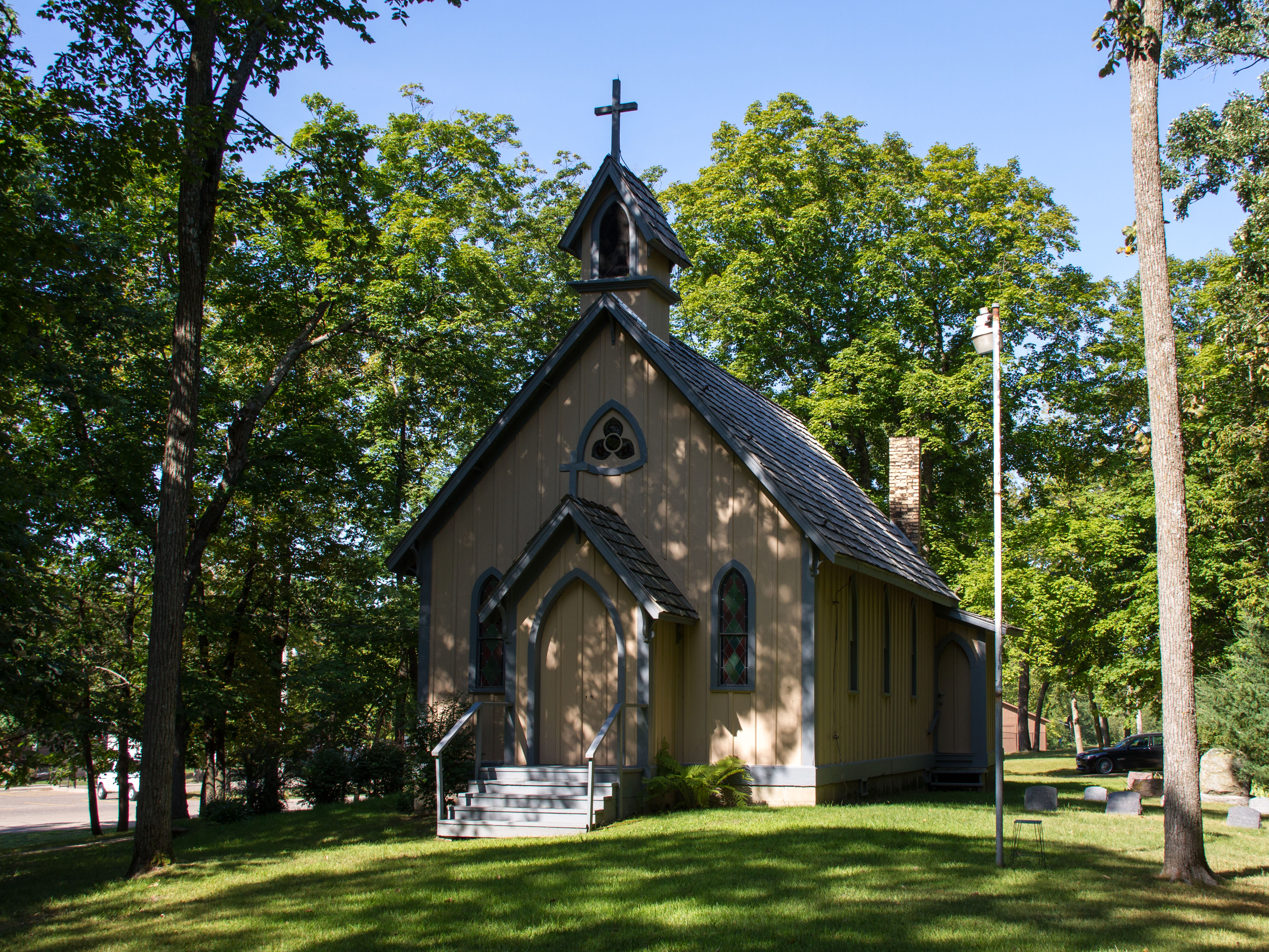
- St. Mark's Episcopal Chapel from the east

- Location within Minnesota Location within the United States
- Location: 10536 108th Street NW, Corinna Township, Minnesota
- Nearest city: Annandale, Minnesota
- Coordinates: 45°18′38.8″N 94°6′23.4″W
- Area: Less than one acre
- Built: 1871
- Architect: Octavius Longworth
- Architectural style: Gothic Revival
- MPS: Wright County MRA
- NRHP reference No.: 79001272
- Added to NRHP: December 11, 1979

St. Mark's Episcopal Chapel is a small Gothic Revival chapel in Corinna Township, Minnesota, United States, built in 1871. It was listed on the National Register of Historic Places in 1979 for having local significance in the themes of architecture and religion. It was nominated as a well-preserved example of a board and batten Gothic Revival parish church. It is located in the Episcopal Diocese of Minnesota.

== History ==
St. Mark's Episcopal Chapel was founded in 1871 by Octavius Longworth and the Reverend David Buel Knickerbacker, who had both been members of St. Mark's Church in Brooklyn, New York. Longworth moved to Wright County, Minnesota, in 1859, while Knickerbacker had moved to Minneapolis in 1856 and become rector of Gethsemane Episcopal Church. Knickerbacker occasionally visited Longworth's house to conduct services. The two decided to establish a church in Wright County, so Longworth donated the land and built the structure. Construction started in 1871 and finished the following year, at which time Bishop Henry Benjamin Whipple dedicated the building. Fifteen years later Bishop Whipple returned to consecrate the building.

== See also ==
- List of Anglican churches
- National Register of Historic Places listings in Wright County, Minnesota
