= Cokato Temperance Hall =

- Cokaton P.R.S. Onnen Toivo Raittiusseura
- U.S. National Register of Historic Places
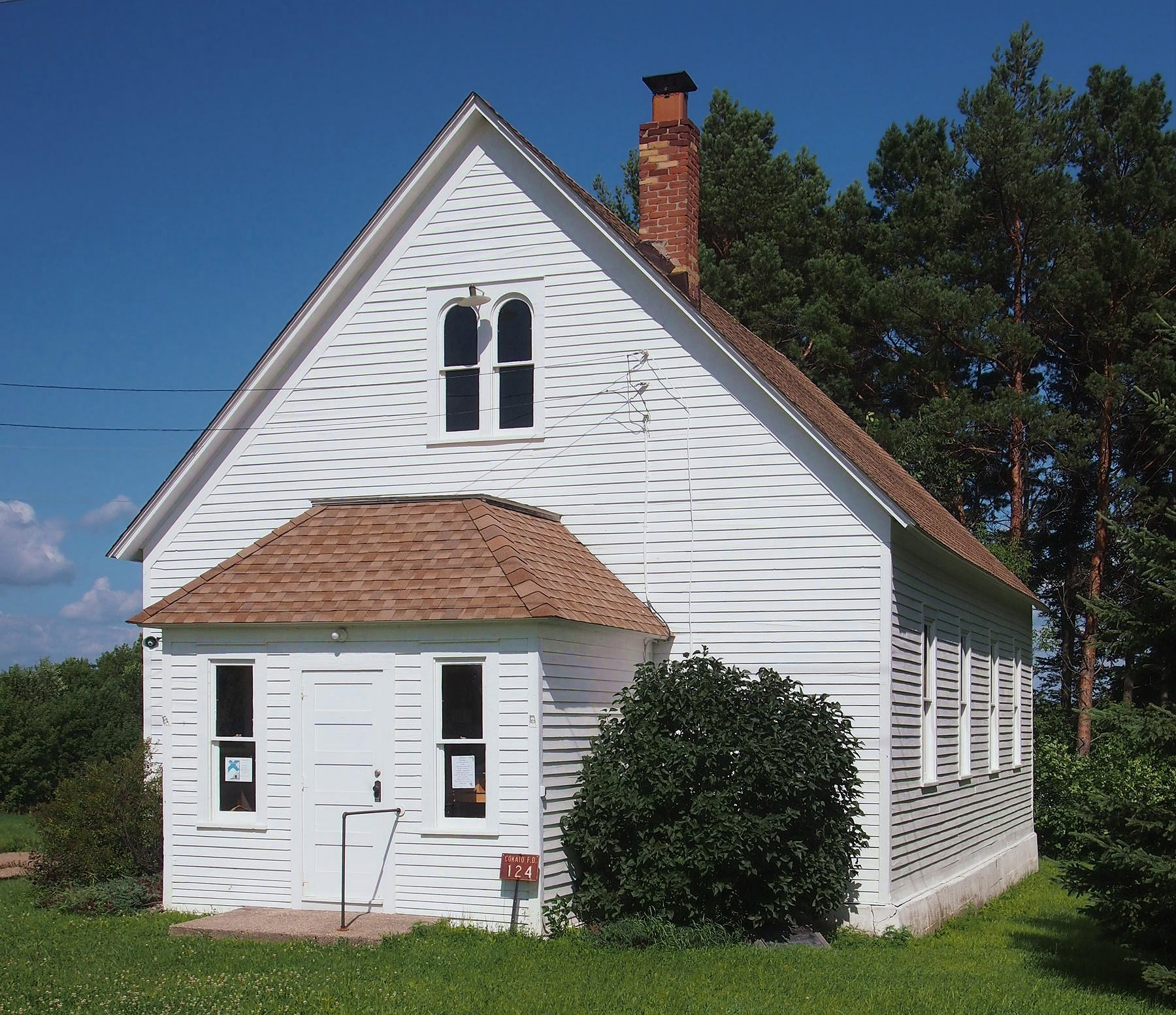
- The Cokato Temperance Hall from the west-southwest

- Location within Minnesota
- Location: County Highway 3 and County Road 100, Cokato Township, Minnesota
- Coordinates: 45°7′22.3″N 94°11′39″W
- Area: Less than one acre
- Built: 1896
- NRHP reference No.: 76001081
- Designated NRHP: December 12, 1976

The Cokato Temperance Hall is a historic clubhouse built in 1896 in Cokato Township, Minnesota, United States, to serve as an alcohol-free social center in a rural Finnish American community. It was constructed by a local temperance society at a rural crossroads which became known as Temperance Corner. The building was listed on the National Register of Historic Places under its full Finnish name Cokaton P.R.S. Onnen Toivo Raittiusseura in 1976 for its local significance in the themes of European ethnic heritage and social history. It was nominated for its association with the temperance movement and importance to the cultural life of an immigrant community. The hall is now maintained by the Cokato Finnish American Historical Society, which has moved other historical structures nearby to form the Finnish Pioneer Park.

== Description ==
The Cokato Temperance Hall is a simple wood-frame building of two stories. It has a rectangular footprint of 25 by 45 feet (7.6 m × 13.7 m), with an 8-by-10-foot (2.4 m × 3.0 m) vestibule projecting from the front façade. There are four windows on the north and south walls, and two arched windows on the second-story gable.

The ground floor interior consists of a single room with a stage at the far end. A narrow staircase in the northeast corner leads to the unfinished upper floor.

== Origin ==
The 19th-century temperance movement in the United States was primarily a xenophobic reaction of native-born Americans to seemingly hard-drinking Irish and German immigrants. However temperance was also a value among some immigrant groups themselves, particularly northern Scandinavians who had seen the destructive effects of alcoholism that could take root during their long, depressing winters.

Finnish immigrants first homesteaded the prairie north of Cokato in 1866. Thirty years later, members of this dispersed Finnish community founded a branch of the Minnesota Temperance Society on August 2, 1896. The local branch was named the Onnen Toivo Temperance Society, meaning "hope of happiness" in the Finnish language. That same year they purchased a quarter-acre lot from a local family at a rural crossroads for $30. The clubhouse was erected on the site under the leadership of Erick Kotila.

== Use ==
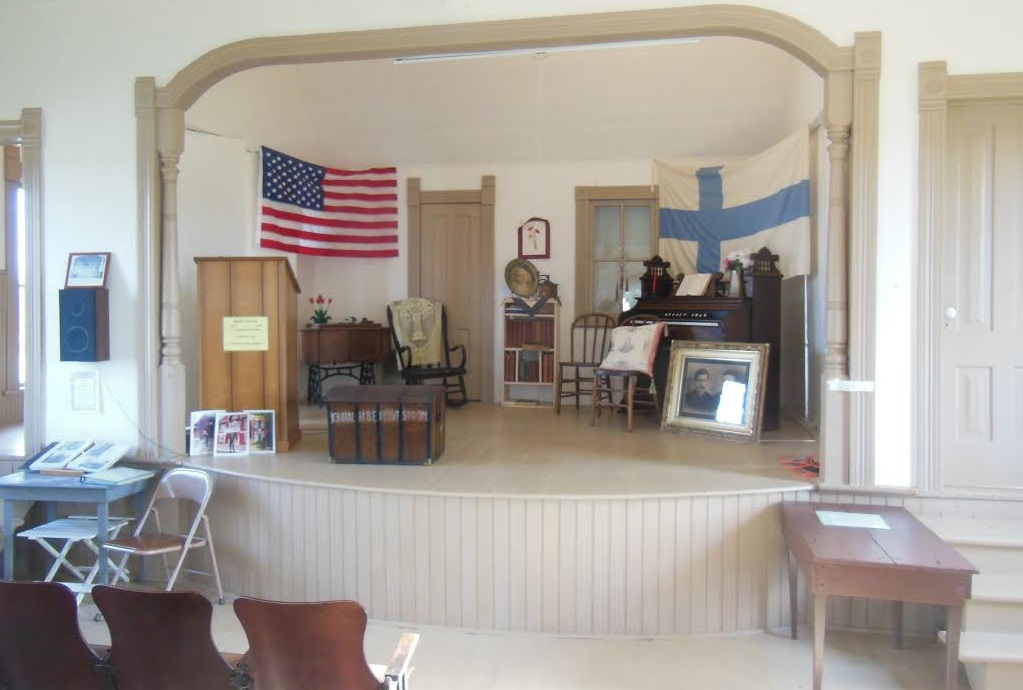
The hall interior in 2015

To join the Onnen Toivo Temperance Society, members had to sign a pledge to abstain from all alcohol. Members who broke their pledge and drank could rejoin if they signed a new pledge. Participants were "to recruit members to take the pledge, detect intemperance, reprimand but forgive offenders and educate the youth to the evils of alcohol." Quarterly dues were 25¢ for males and 15¢ for females. Meetings could draw up to 44 attendees, quite a crowd given the low population and difficulty of travel.

Although temperance was the price of admission, the hall really served to maintain the settlers' Finnish heritage and sense of community. It became the area's recreational and social hub. Its stage was used for plays, skits, lectures, and music performances by local and traveling presenters. The hall's recreational importance surged in 1910 when an athletic club was formed, offering gymnastics, boxing, wrestling, and other sports. Gatherings like box socials raised money for charitable causes while providing young people the chance to meet potential romantic partners. The hall also hosted civic functions such as township meetings, school events, and elections. A charitable society formed to ship food, clothing, and other assistance to Finland from World War I to 1959. They were especially active during the Winter War of 1939–40, as the Soviet Union invaded Finland but U.S. foreign policy forbade federal assistance.

The hall was renovated in 1939, receiving a new roof and foundation, repaired floor, repainted exterior, and redecorated interior. A painted stage curtain advertising a local business was added; it is now on display in the Cokato Museum.

== Later history ==
The Cokato Temperance Hall was used for social and school events into the 1950s. By 1967 it had fallen into disrepair, and was sold to a private owner. Three years later he sold it to a church group, the Church of God of the First Born, which used it for services for a few years before folding. In the 1970s the hall was purchased by the Cokato Finnish American Historical Society, which had been chartered in 1939 to preserve local heritage. They refurbished the hall and assembled other historical buildings at Temperance Corner to form the Finnish Pioneer Park. The park now includes the 1896 temperance hall, an 1899 one-room schoolhouse, an 1866 log cabin from one of the area's first settlers, and the 1868 Barberg–Selvälä–Salmonson Sauna—which is believed to be the oldest savusauna in the United States.

The Cokato Finnish American Historical Society holds several annual events at the Pioneer Park, including observances of Finnish holidays like Juhannus and Pikkujoulu. Tours of the historical buildings are available by appointment.

== See also ==
- National Register of Historic Places listings in Wright County, Minnesota
