= George Borg =

George Borg may refer to:

- George Borg (judge) (1887–1954), Chief Justice of Malta
- George August Borg (1888–1969), American businessman and politician
- George M. Borg (1934–1971), American politician

== See also ==
- George Borg Olivier (1911–1980), Maltese politician
