= French Lake =

French Lake may refer to:

- French Lake, California
- French Lake, a lake in Dayton, Hennepin County, Minnesota
- French Lake, a lake in McLeod County, Minnesota
- French Lake, a lake in Rice County, Minnesota
- French Lake (Wright County, Minnesota)
- French Lake in Mineral County, Montana
