= Stephen J. Stein =

American academic, author, and educator (1940–2022)

- Born: March 22, 1940; Chillicothe, Missouri
- Died: January 12, 2022 (aged 81); Indianapolis, Indiana

Academic background
- Education: Concordia Seminary; Yale University
- Doctoral advisor: Sydney E. Ahlstrom

Academic work
- Discipline: Religion in the United States
- Sub-discipline: Shakers, Jonathan Edwards, new religious movements
- Institutions: Indiana University Bloomington

Stephen Joseph Stein (March 22, 1940 - January 12, 2022) was an American academic, author, and educator. His writings focused on religion in the United States. He was the Chancellor's Professor Emeritus of Religious Studies at Indiana University in Bloomington, Indiana, and served as President of the American Society of Church History. He is known especially for his writing on eighteenth-century religious thought, particularly the Shakers, Jonathan Edwards, and new religious movements. His 1992 book The Shaker Experience in America won the Philip Schaff prize from the American Society of Church History and has been seen as a definitive work on the topic.

== Early life and education ==
Stein was born on March 22, 1940, in Chillicothe, Missouri. His father was a Lutheran pastor and Air Force chaplain, and his mother was a teacher. Stein's family moved multiple times as he grew up because of his father's work. He attended high school at Concordia College in Austin, Texas, before transferring to St. Paul's College in Concordia Missouri, where he completed high school and two years of junior college. He then attended Concordia Senior College in Fort Wayne, Indiana, from which he graduated in 1962 before going on to Concordia Seminary in St. Louis.

Stein began his career teaching at Lutheran High School North in St. Louise, where he realized he did not want to become a pastor. He then attended Yale University to study American religious history under Sydney E. Ahlstrom. Ahlstrom suggested Stein's dissertation on Jonathan Edwards' "Notes on the Apocalypse". Stein graduated with a Ph.D. in 1970 and joined the Department of Religious Studies at Indiana University Bloomington the same year.

== Career ==
Stein taught religious studies and history at Indiana University, with a specialization in eighteenth-century religious thought. He served as editor of The Works of Jonathan Edwards published by Yale University Press in two volumes, Apocalyptic Writings (1977) and Notes on Scripture (1998), as well as a scholarly edition of Edwards' "Blank Bible". Edwin Gaustad has said of Stein's editing work that "It would be difficult to exaggerate Stein's diligence, thoroughness, and prodigious scholarship." Stein also published various works on religion including Letters from a Young Shaker: William S. Byrd at Pleasant Hill (1985); The Shaker Experience in America: A History of the United Society of Believers (1992); Alternative American Religious (2000); and Communities of Dissent: A History of Alternative Religions in America (2003); and was editor of Apocalypticism in the Modern Period and the Contemporary Age, volume 3 in The Encyclopedia of Apocalypticism (1998). He contributed to works such as Critical essays on Jonathan Edwards (1980); The Apocalypse in English Renaissance thought and literature (1984); Perspectives on American religion and culture (1999); Pietism in Germany and North America 1680-1820 (2009); and The Columbia guide to religion in American history (2012). His research has included religious diversity and dissenting religious communities in America, as well as the role of apocalyptic literature, and the implications of the religious clause of the First Amendment.

Stein's The Shaker Experience in America is widely regarded as the definitive study of the religion and culture of the Shakers, and received the Philip Schaff prize from the American Society of Church History. William Sims Bainbridge wrote: "Stein's superb book is a revelation in at least three ways. First, it reminds us that historical research and writing can be performed at a very high level of skill and thoroughness, something we may have forgotten if the history we read is limited to small religious movements. Second, it casts the pre-twentieth-century Shakers in a substantially new light, through fact-based revision of the untrustworthy accounts by earlier writers. Third, it brings their story up to the present day, with an enlightening synopsis of the closure of most Shaker colonies and the precarious survival of the Canterbury and Sabbathday Lake communities." Another review called it "an unusually comprehensive and eminently readable chronicle of more than two centuries of Shaker life;" and Marilyn J. Westerkamp called it "religious history at its best".

From 1994 to 1995, Stein served as president of American Society of Church History, he was awarded fellowships from the National Endowment for the Humanities, and received Indiana University's College of Arts and Sciences Distinguished Faculty Award and the Tracy M. Sonneborn Award for Excellence in Teaching and Research. He was Director of American Studies at Indiana University from 1981 to 1984, and chaired the Religious Studies department from 1990 to 1998. He served as co-editor along with Catherine L. Albanese of the "Religion in North America" series put out by Indiana University Press. He also served on the National Advisory Board of The Joseph Smith Papers along with other scholars such as Terryl L. Givens, Harry S. Stout, Richard Lyman Bushman, and Dean C. Jessee.

Stein retired from teaching in 2005. He died in 2022 at the age of 81.

== Selected works ==
=== Books ===
- The Cambridge History of Religions in America, 3 Volume Set, edited by Stephen Stein (Cambridge: Cambridge University Press, 2012)
- The Cambridge Companion to Jonathan Edwards (Cambridge: Cambridge University Press, 2007)
- The “Blank Bible,” vol. 24, Parts 1 and 2, in the Yale Edition of The Works of Jonathan Edwards (New Haven: Yale University Press, 2006)
- The Continuum History of Apocalypticism, edited by Bernard McGinn, John J. Collins, and Stephen J. Stein (New York: Continuum International Publishing Group, 2003)
- Communities of Dissent: A History of Alternative Religions in America (New York: Oxford University Press, 2003)
- Alternative American Religions (New York: Oxford University Press, 2000)
- Apocalypticism in the Modern Period and the Contemporary Age, vol 3, in The Encyclopedia of Apocalypticism, edited by John J. Collins, Bernard McGinn, and Stephen J. Stein (New York: Continuum Publishing Company, 1998)
- Notes on Scripture, vol. 15, in the Yale Edition of The Works of Jonathan Edwards (New Haven: Yale University Press, 1998)
- The Writings of Jonathan Edwards: Text, Context, Interpretation (Bloomington: Indiana University Press, 1996)
- The Shaker Experience in America: A History of the United Society of Believers (New Haven: Yale University Press, 1992 [cloth], 1994 [paper])
- Letters from a Young Shaker: William S. Byrd at Pleasant Hill (Lexington: The University Press of Kentucky, 1985)
- Apocalyptic Writings, vol. 5, in the Yale Edition of The Works of Jonathan Edwards (New Haven: Yale University Press, 1977)

=== Articles and other writings ===
- "Gender and Authority: Women in Shaker History," in Rivista di Storia del Cristianesimo
- "Historical Reflections on Mormon Futures," The Tanner Lecture, Journal of Mormon History, 33, no. 1 (Spring 2007), 39-64
- "'Taking up the Full Cross’: The Shaker Challenge to the Western Christians," Discipliana: The Quarterly Historical Journal of the Disciples of Christ Historical Society 65, no. 3 (Fall 2005), 93-110
- "American Millennial Visions: Toward Construction of a New Architectonic of American Apocalypticism," Imagining the End: Visions of Apocalypse from the Ancient Middle East to Modern America, Abbas Amanat and Magnús T. Bernhardsson, eds., (London: Palgrave, 2001), 187-211
- "Religion/Religions in the United States: Changing Perspectives and Prospects," Indiana Law Journal 75, no. 1 (2000), 37-60
- Conser, Walter H. Jr.; Twiss, Sumner B., eds. (1997). "History, Historians, and the Historiography of Indigenous Sectarian Religious Movements in America". Religious Diversity and American Religious History: Studies in Traditions and Cultures. University of Georgia Press. pp. 128–156.
- "America's Bibles: Canon, Commentary, and Community". Church History. 64 (2): 169–184. 1995. doi:10.2307/3167903. ISSN 0009-6407.
- ""For Their Spiritual Good": The Northampton, Massachusetts, Prayer Bids of the 1730s and 1740s". The William and Mary Quarterly. 37 (2): 261–285. 1980. doi:10.2307/1919499. ISSN 0043-5597.
- "An Apocalyptic Rationale for the American Revolution". Early American Literature. 9 (3): 211–225. 1975. ISSN 0012-8163.
- "George Whitefield on Slavery: Some New Evidence". Church History. 42 (2): 243–256. 1973. doi:10.2307/3163671. ISSN 0009-6407.

== Awards and honors ==
- National Endowment for the Humanities Research Fellowships, 1974, 1985
- Indiana University Distinguished Teaching Awards, 1981
- Indiana University College of Arts & Sciences Distinguished Faculty Award, 1991
- President of the American Society of Church History, 1994
- Chancellor’s Professorship in Teaching and Research, 1995
- Indiana University's Tracy M. Sonneborn Award for Excellence in Teaching and Research, 1995
- Indiana University Trustees Award for Teaching Excellence, 2003
- Indiana University Chancellor's Professor Emeritus of Religious Studies, 2005
