= Sydney E. Ahlstrom =

American historian (1919–1984)

- Born: Sydney Eckman Ahlstrom; December 16, 1919; Cokato, Minnesota, US
- Died: July 3, 1984 (aged 64); New Haven, Connecticut, US

Academic background
- Education: Gustavus Adolphus College (BA); University of Minnesota (MA); Harvard University (PhD)
- Thesis: Francis Ellingwood Abbot (1951)

Academic work
- Discipline: History
- Sub-discipline: American religious history
- Institutions: Yale University
- Doctoral students: Henry D. Abelove; James Bratt; George Marsden; Mark E. Neely Jr.; Hillel Schwartz; Stephen J. Stein
- Notable works: A Religious History of the American People (1972)
- Influenced: Albert J. Raboteau

Sydney Eckman Ahlstrom (December 16, 1919 – July 3, 1984) was an American historian. He was a Yale University professor and a specialist in the religious history of the United States.

== Biography ==
Ahlstrom was born on December 16, 1919, in Cokato, Minnesota, the son of Joseph T. Ahlstrom (1878–1942) and Selma (Eckman) Ahlstrom (1881–1976), who were Swedish-American Lutherans. He graduated from Gustavus Adolphus College in St. Peter, Minnesota, with a Bachelor of Arts degree in 1941, and served in the US Army during the Second World War. He earned a master's degree at the University of Minnesota in 1946 and a Doctor of Philosophy degree at Harvard University in 1952. He was a Fulbright fellow at the University of Strasbourg, France, and an instructor at Harvard before joining Yale in 1954.

In 1973, he received the National Book Award in category Philosophy and Religion for A Religious History of the American People (1972).

He was elected a fellow of the American Academy of Arts and Sciences in 1978. In 1979, he was awarded the Christian Century Award for the Decade's Most Outstanding Book on Religion.

At the time of his retirement from Yale in 1984, he held the position of Samuel Knight Professor of American History and Modern Religious History. He died on July 3, 1984, in New Haven, Connecticut.

== Bibliography ==
=== Books ===
- A Religious History of the American People (1972; 2nd ed. 2004)
- The American frontier and the Protestant missionary response (1960)

=== Edited volumes ===
- An American reformation: A documentary history of Unitarian Christianity, edited with Jonathan S. Carey (1998)
- Theology in America: The major Protestant voices from Puritanism to Neo-Orthodoxy (1967)

=== Representative articles ===
- "The Scottish Philosophy and American Theology," Church History, Vol. 24, No. 3 (Sep., 1955), pp. 257–272 in JSTOR
- "Continental Influence on American Christian Thought Since World War I," Church History, Vol. 27, No. 3 (Sept 1958), pp. 256–272 in JSTOR
- "Theology and the Present-Day Revival," Annals of the American Academy of Political and Social Science Vol. 332, Religion in American Society (Nov., 1960), pp. 20–36 in JSTOR
- "Thomas Hooker: Puritanism and Democratic Citizenship: A Preliminary Inquiry into Some Relationships of Religion and American Civic Responsibility," Church History, Vol. 32, No. 4 (Dec., 1963), pp. 415–431 in JSTOR
- "The Radical Turn in Theology and Ethics: Why It Occurred in 1960s," Annals of the American Academy of Political and Social Science Vol. 387, The Sixties: Radical Change in American Religion (Jan., 1970), pp. 1–13 in JSTOR
- "Religion, Revolution and the Rise of Modern Nationalism: Reflections on the American Experience," Church History, Vol. 44, No. 4 (Dec., 1975), pp. 492–504 in JSTOR
- "The Religious Dimension of American Aspirations," Review of Politics vol. 38, No. 3, Bicentennial Issue (Jul., 1976), pp. 332–342 in JSTOR
- "The Romantic Religious Revolution and the Dilemmas of Religious History The Romantic Religious Revolution and the Dilemmas of Religious History," Church History, Vol. 46, No. 2 (Jun., 1977), pp. 149–170 in JSTOR
- "The Problem of the History of Religion in America," Church History, Vol. 57, Supplement: Centennial Issue (1988), pp. 127–138 in JSTOR
