= James Bratt =

American historian (born 1949)

- Born: James Donald Bratt; 1949 (age 76–77)

Academic background
- Education: Calvin College; Yale University
- Thesis: Dutch Calvinism in Modern America (1978)
- Doctoral advisor: Sydney E. Ahlstrom

Academic work
- Discipline: History
- Sub-discipline: American religious history; colonial American history; intellectual history
- Institutions: Calvin College
- Main interests: Abraham Kuyper; Second Great Awakening

James Donald Bratt (born 1949) is a scholar of Abraham Kuyper, and is an emeritus professor at Calvin College.

An alumnus of Calvin, Bratt received his Doctor of Philosophy degree from Yale University after writing his dissertation, Dutch Calvinism in Modern America. He has published a biography of Kuyper in 2013. His other areas of specialty include colonial American history, and American intellectual and religious history.

== Bibliography ==
- Dutch Calvinism in Modern America (Eerdmans, 1984) ISBN 1-59244-122-X
- Abraham Kuyper: A Centennial Reader (Eerdmans, 1998) ISBN 0-8028-4321-2
- Antirevivalism in Antebellum America: A Collection of Religious Voices (editor) (Rutgers University Press, 2005) ISBN 0-8135-3692-8
- Abraham Kuyper: Modern Calvinist, Christian Democrat (Eerdmans, 2013) ISBN 978-0-8028-6906-7
