= Corinna Township, Wright County, Minnesota =

Corinna Township, Minnesota
- Township
- Location within the state of Minnesota Corinna Township, Minnesota (the United States)
- Coordinates: 45°17′N 94°4′W
- Country: United States
- State: Minnesota
- County: Wright

Area
  - Total: 33.4 sq mi (86.4 km^{2})
  - Land: 24.9 sq mi (64.4 km^{2})
  - Water: 8.5 sq mi (22.0 km^{2})
- Elevation: 1,004 ft (306 m)

Population (2000)
  - Total: 2,457
  - Density: 99/sq mi (38.2/km^{2})
- Time zone: UTC-6 (Central (CST))
  - Summer (DST): UTC-5 (CDT)
- FIPS code: 27-13222
- GNIS feature ID: 0663870
- Website: https://corinnatownship.com/

Corinna Township is a township in Wright County, Minnesota, United States. The population was 2,457 at the 2000 census.

Corinna Township was organized in 1858, and named after Corinna, Maine. The 1871 St. Mark's Episcopal Chapel in Corinna Township is listed on the National Register of Historic Places.

== Geography ==
According to the United States Census Bureau, the township has a total area of 33.3 square miles (86 km^{2}), of which 24.9 square miles (64 km^{2}) is land and 8.5 square miles (22 km^{2}) (25.49%) is water.

The city of Annandale is located within Corinna Township geographically but is a separate entity.

Corinna Township is located in Township 121 North of the Arkansas Base Line and Range 27 West of the 5th Principal Meridian.

== Demographics ==
As of the census of 2000, there were 2,457 people, 944 households, and 711 families residing in the township. The population density was 98.9 inhabitants per square mile (38.2/km^{2}). There were 1,615 housing units at an average density of 65.0 per square mile (25.1/km^{2}). The racial makeup of the township was 98.82% White, 0.28% African American, 0.41% Native American, 0.04% Asian, 0.04% Pacific Islander, 0.08% from other races, and 0.33% from two or more races. Hispanic or Latino of any race were 0.37% of the population.

There were 944 households, out of which 30.1% had children under the age of 18 living with them, 69.1% were married couples living together, 3.9% had a female householder with no husband present, and 24.6% were non-families. 19.6% of all households were made up of individuals, and 6.8% had someone living alone who was 65 years of age or older. The average household size was 2.57 and the average family size was 2.97.

In the township the population was spread out, with 24.4% under the age of 18, 5.9% from 18 to 24, 27.4% from 25 to 44, 27.6% from 45 to 64, and 14.7% who were 65 years of age or older. The median age was 40 years. For every 100 females, there were 105.6 males. For every 100 females age 18 and over, there were 108.1 males.

The median income for a household in the township was $53,770, and the median income for a family was $57,115. Males had a median income of $44,028 versus $31,290 for females. The per capita income for the township was $28,610. About 3.6% of families and 5.0% of the population were below the poverty line, including 7.3% of those under age 18 and 3.2% of those age 65 or over.
