= Thayer Hotel (Annandale, Minnesota) =

- U.S. National Register of Historic Places
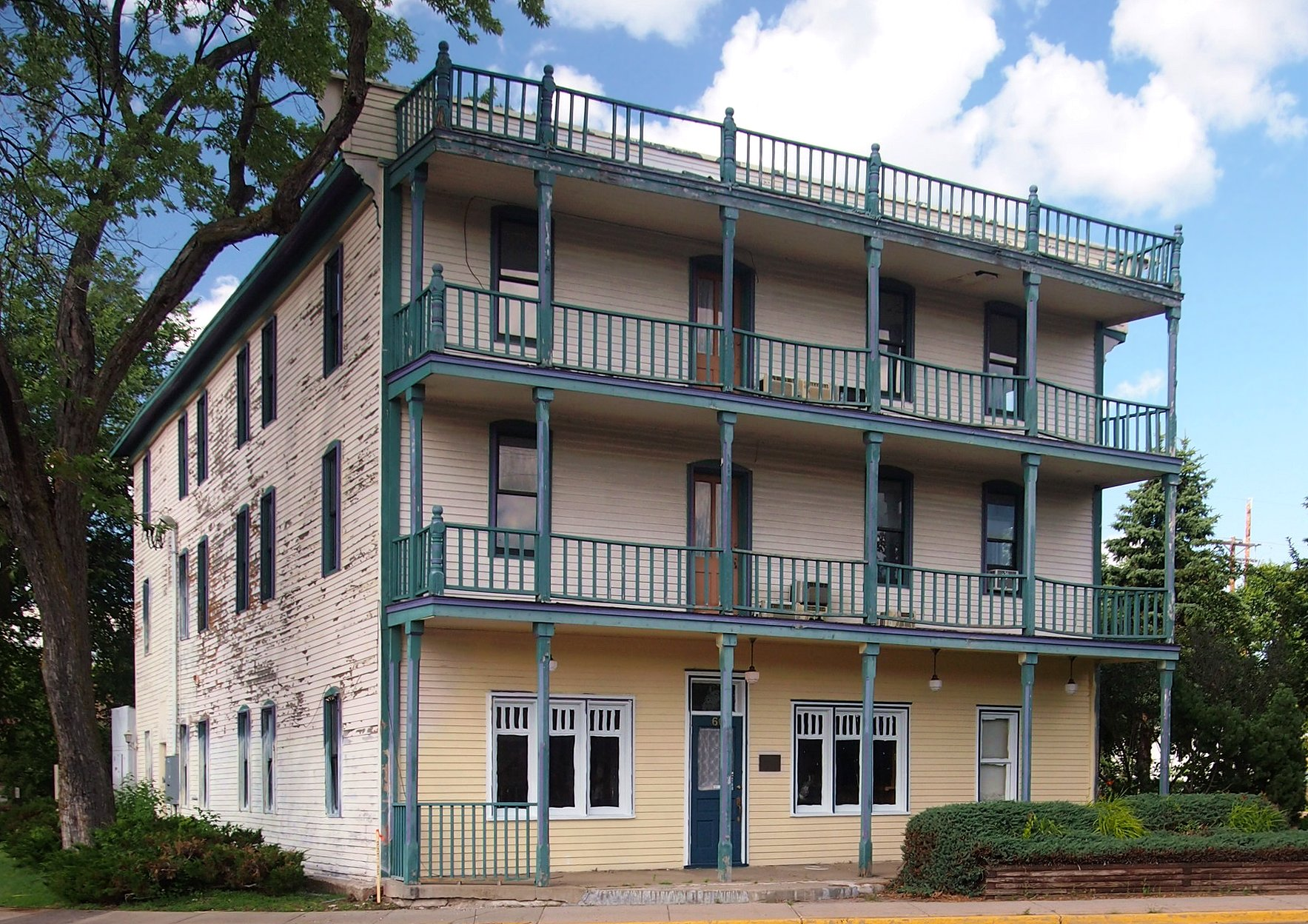
- The Thayer Hotel from the south-southwest

- Location within Minnesota Location within the United States
- Location: 60 Elm Street West, Annandale, Minnesota
- Coordinates: 45°15′44.3″N 94°7′32.3″W
- Area: Less than one acre
- Built: 1895
- Architectural style: Carpenter Gothic
- NRHP reference No.: 78001573
- Added to NRHP: August 24, 1978

The Thayer Hotel is a historic hotel building in Annandale, Minnesota, United States, built in 1895. It was listed on the National Register of Historic Places in 1978 for its local significance in the theme of commerce. It was nominated as a significant example of the large, wood-frame hotels serving Wright County at the turn of the 20th century.

The Thayer Hotel is a three-story building with a full-front veranda. The building operated as a bed and breakfast, from 1995 to 2011 when the owner and operator Sharon Gammell retired in 2011. The building sat vacant until 2016.

On March 24, 2018, the building reopened as a restaurant. By the end of 2018, the Thayer was again operating as a full-service hotel with a restaurant on the first floor.

== See also ==
- National Register of Historic Places listings in Wright County, Minnesota
