= George August Borg =

American politician

George August Borg (July 3, 1888 – October 27, 1968) was an American businessman and politician.

Borg was born in Carver County, Minnesota and was raised on a farm. He served in the United States Army in the Officers Reserve Corps. Borg went to business school and to University of Minnesota. He lived in Cokato, Wright County, Minnesota and was involved with the banking business and was a director of the Northwest Canning Company. Borg served in the Minnesota House of Representatives in 1925 and 1926. He died in Meeker County, Minnesota.
