= A Religious History of the American People =

1972/2004 book by Sydney E. Ahlstrom

- Author: Sydney E. Ahlstrom
- Language: English
- Subject: American religious history
- Publisher: Yale University Press
- Publication date: 1972 (1st ed.); 2004 (2nd ed.)
- Publication place: United States
- Pages: 1,158 (1st ed.); 1,192 (2nd ed.)
- ISBN: 978-0-385-11164-5 (1st ed.)
- Dewey Decimal: 200/.973
- LC Class: BR515 .A4

A Religious History of the American People (1st edition 1972, 2nd edition 2004) is a book by Sydney E. Ahlstrom and published by Yale University Press. The first edition was 1,158 pages in length, the second 1,192.

== Contents ==
The first edition of the book consists of nine parts that divide up sixty-three chapters in total. Part one "European Prologue", Part two "The Protestant Empire Founded", Part three "The Century of Awakening and Revolution", Part four "The Golden Day of Democratic Evangelicalism", Part five "Countervailing Religion", Part six "Slavery and Expiation", Part seven "The Ordeals of Transition", Part eight "The Age of Faltering Crusades", and Part nine "Toward Post-Puritan America". It also has illustrations, a preface, bibliography, and index.

The second edition contains an additional chapter and preface covering the last three decades. These were contributed by another historian of religion, David D. Hall. There are new sections on "Pentecostal and Charismatic Renewal" (pp. 1103–1106), "Roman Catholicism" (pp. 1107–1109), "Newcomers and outsiders: Jews, Mormons, Buddhists, Hindus, and Muslims" (pp. 1109–1113), "African Americans: Christians and Muslims" (pp. 1113–1115), and "Moderate and Liberal Protestants" (pp. 1115–1117).

== Reception ==
The book has been widely reviewed and well-received, including positive mentions in both Christianity Today and Christian Century. The book received positive reviews from scholars for its scope when it first appeared.

In 2002, Catherine L. Albanese called the work the "last comprehensive production of the consensus school" of American religion. According to her, postmodernist and related studies have moved away from the grand overarching narrative used in Ahlstrom's book.
