= Cokato Museum & Gust Akerlund Studio =

Museum in Cokato, Minnesota, United States

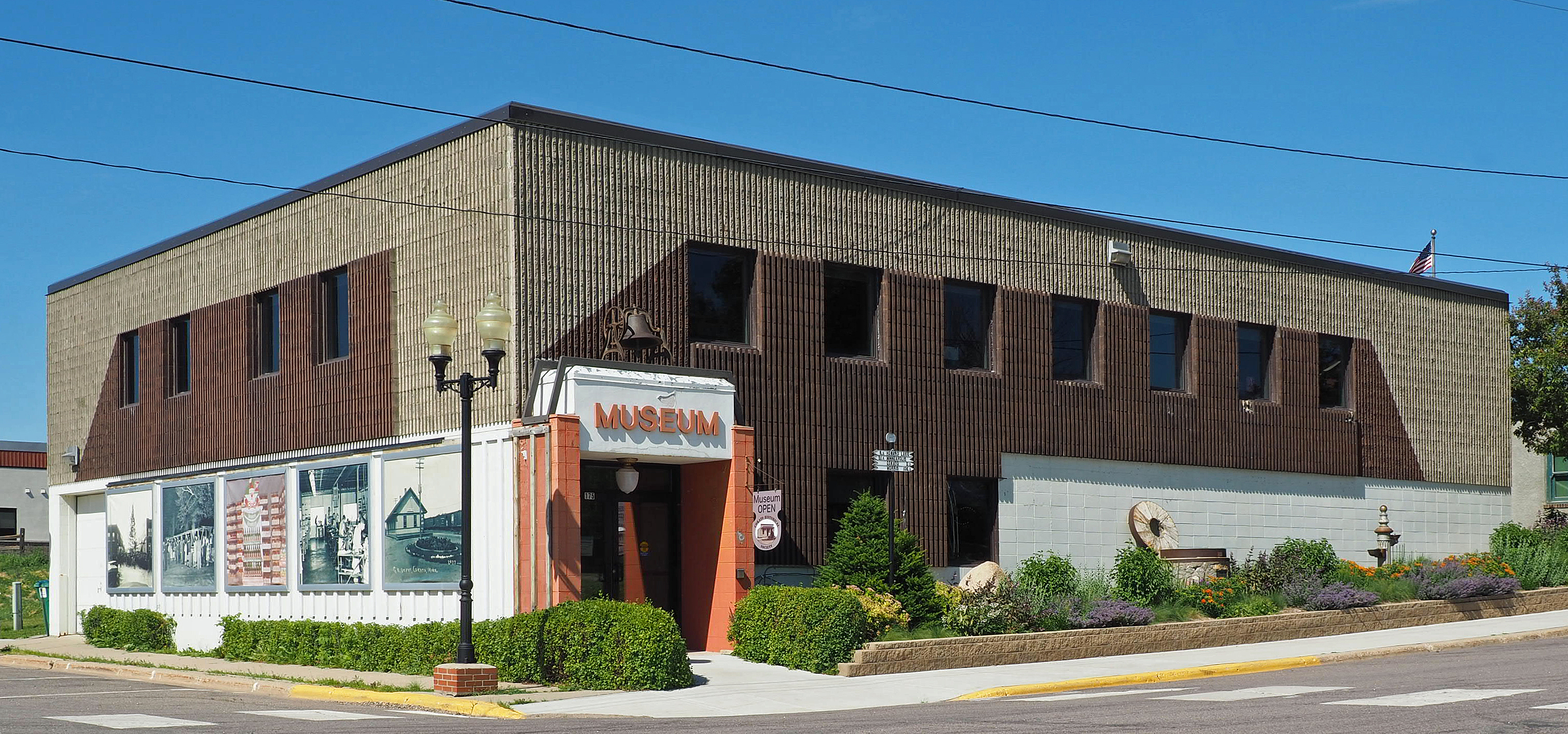
- The Cokato Museum from the southwest

- Location within Minnesota
- Established: 1976
- Location: 175 4th Street Southwest, Cokato, Minnesota
- Coordinates: 45°4′31.5″N 94°11′26″W
- Type: Local history
- Website: http://www.cokatomuseum.org/
- August Akerlund Photographic Studio
- U.S. National Register of Historic Places
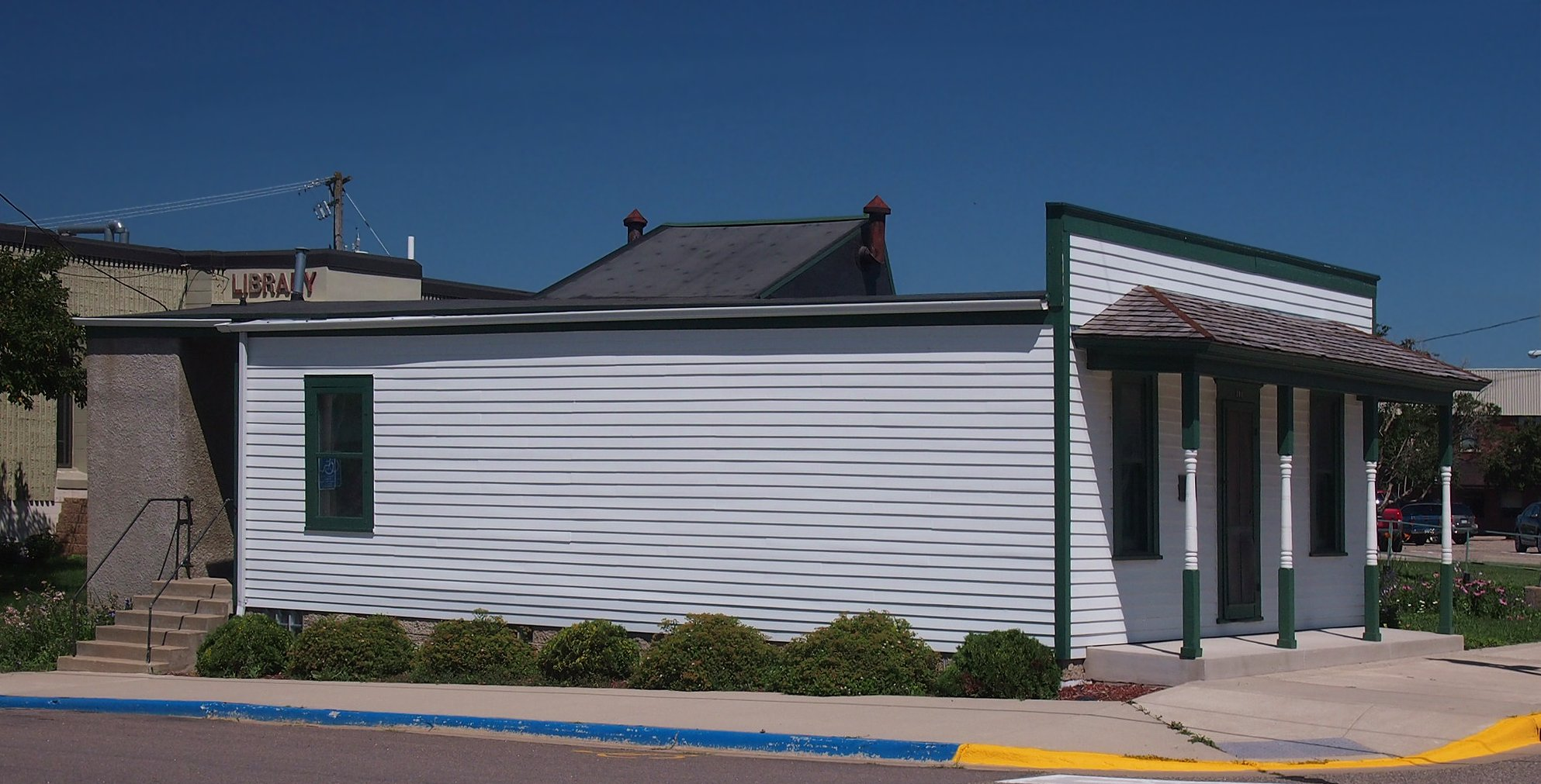
- The August Akerlund Photographic Studio from the southeast
- Location: 390 Broadway Avenue, Cokato, Minnesota
- Coordinates: 45°4′31.3″N 94°11′25″W
- Area: Less than one acre
- Built: 1905
- Architect: Gust Akerlund
- NRHP reference No.: 77000777
- Added to NRHP: April 11, 1977

The Cokato Museum & Gust Akerlund Studio is a local history museum in Cokato, Minnesota, United States, focused on the city of Cokato and the surrounding townships of southwest Wright County. The museum comprises two adjacent buildings, the modern museum hall and the August Akerlund Photographic Studio—the only known early-20th-century photographic studio still standing in the Upper Midwest. The museum is operated through a partnership between the City of Cokato and the Cokato Historical Society, a 501(c)(3) non-profit organization.

== Cokato Museum ==
The Cokato Museum opened in 1976. Its permanent displays explore the region's cultural, economic, and social history. A second gallery features temporary exhibits built around local history themes. Within the museum are several full-size replicas, including a furnished log cabin, a partial reconstruction of the Titrud Round Barn, and an early-20th-century streetscape. The museum also has a research area, which includes local newspapers, state and federal census records, church records, cemetery listings, and family histories.

== Gust Akerlund Studio ==
The Gust Akerlund Studio was the commercial photography studio of Swedish immigrant August "Gust" Akerlund (1872–1954). Akerlund operated the studio for most of the first half of the 20th century. Akerlund purchased the building from another Cokato photographer in 1902. In 1905 he had the studio moved to its current location and added a skylight. In 1927 he married Esther Hanson, who was thirty years his junior, and within the next few years he had an apartment added to the rear of the studio to serve as their living quarters.

The studio was listed on the National Register of Historic Places in 1977 for its local significance in architecture and commerce. It was nominated for being one of the few surviving examples of an early-20th-century photography studio.

Esther Akerlund continued to live in the studio apartment until shortly before her death in 1985. Their son Ted donated the studio and its contents to the city for restoration, and it opened to the public in 1986. The building still contains its original furnishings, arrayed as they appeared in the 1930s, including the Akerlunds' pump organ, horsehair couch, and Mission style rocking chair. In the studio are Akerlund's cameras and other equipment, plus his collection of over 14,000 negatives, of which over 11,000 are glass plate negatives.

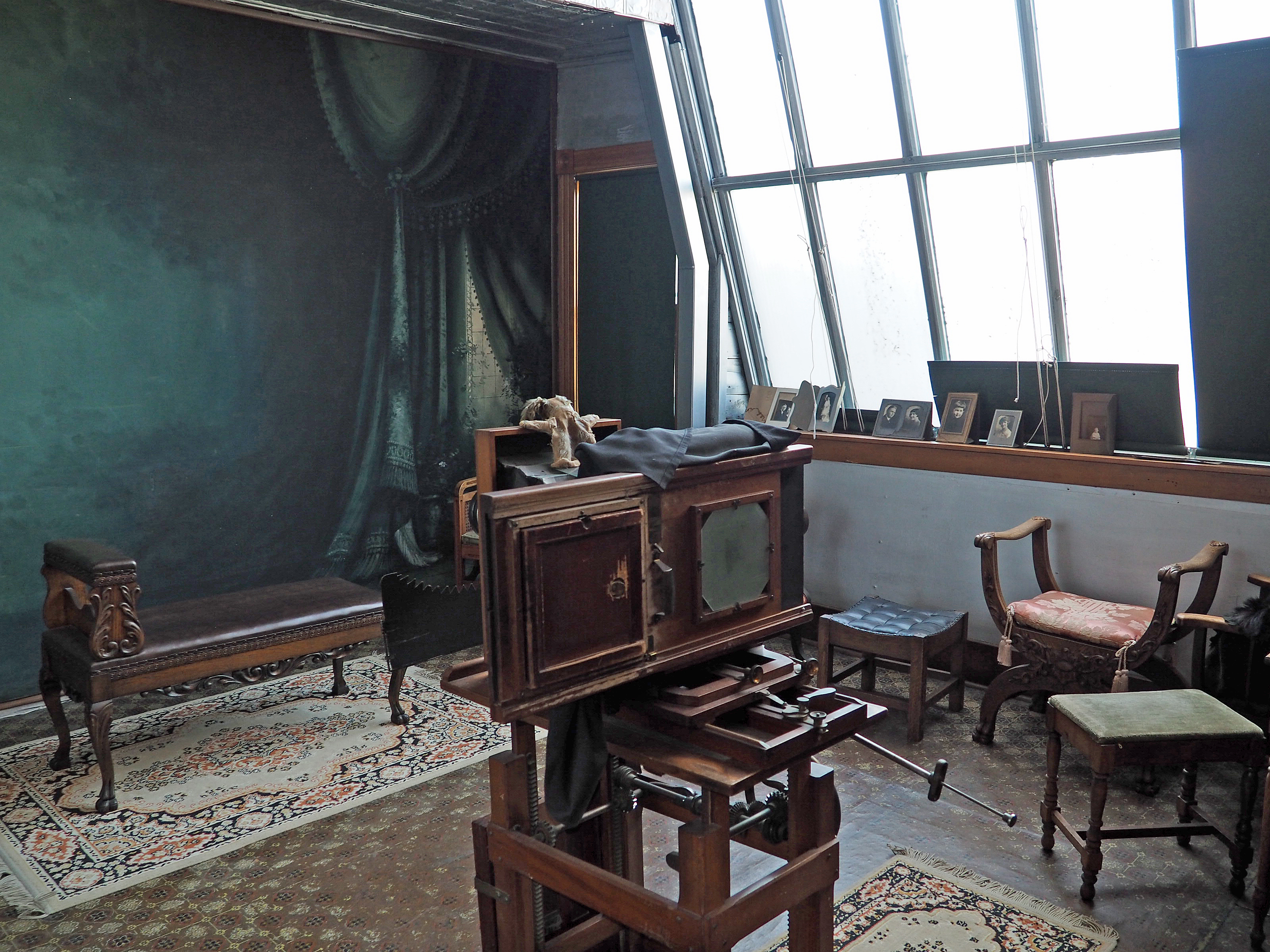
Posing room with 12-foot (3.7 m) skylight

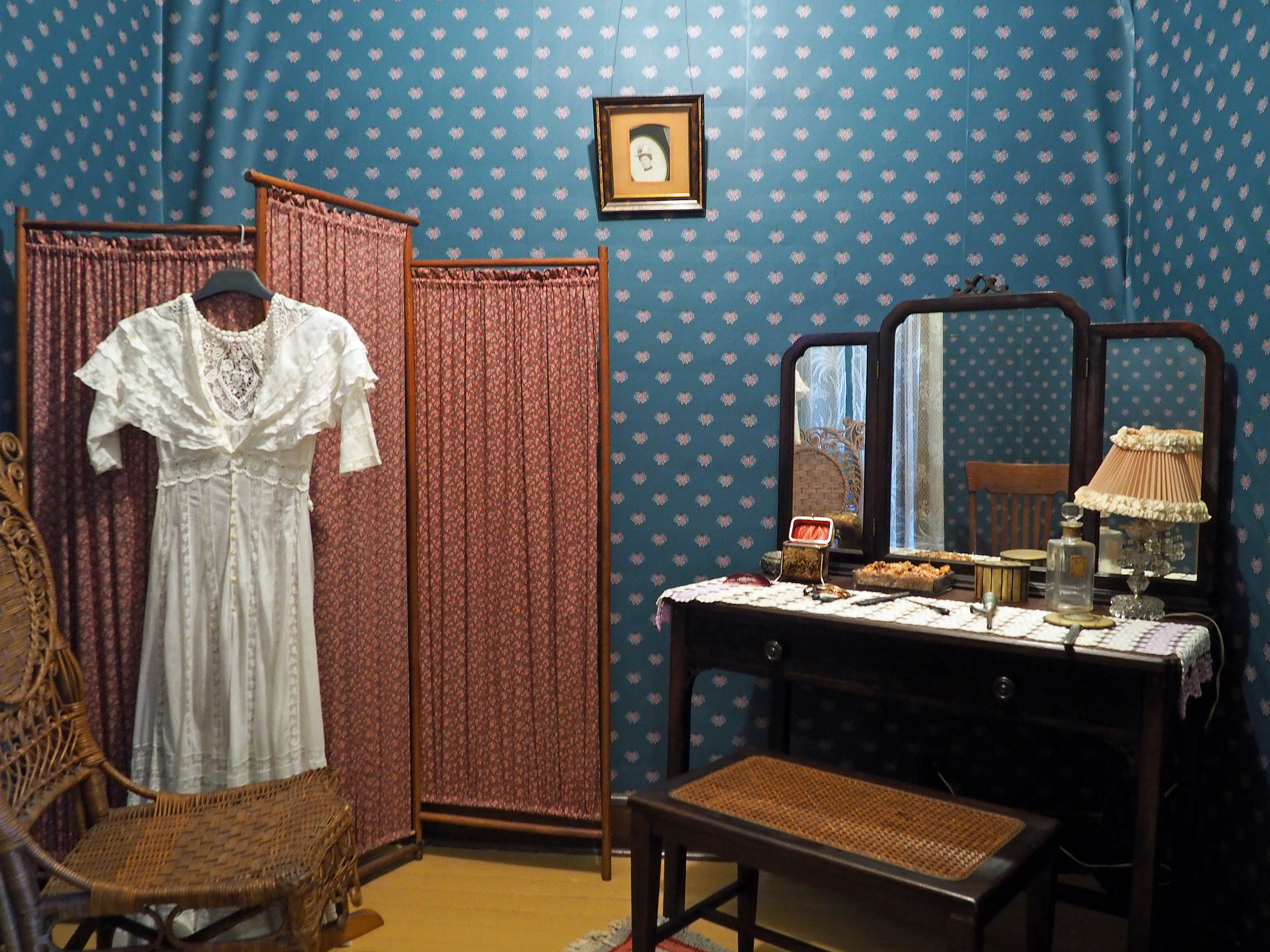
Dressing room

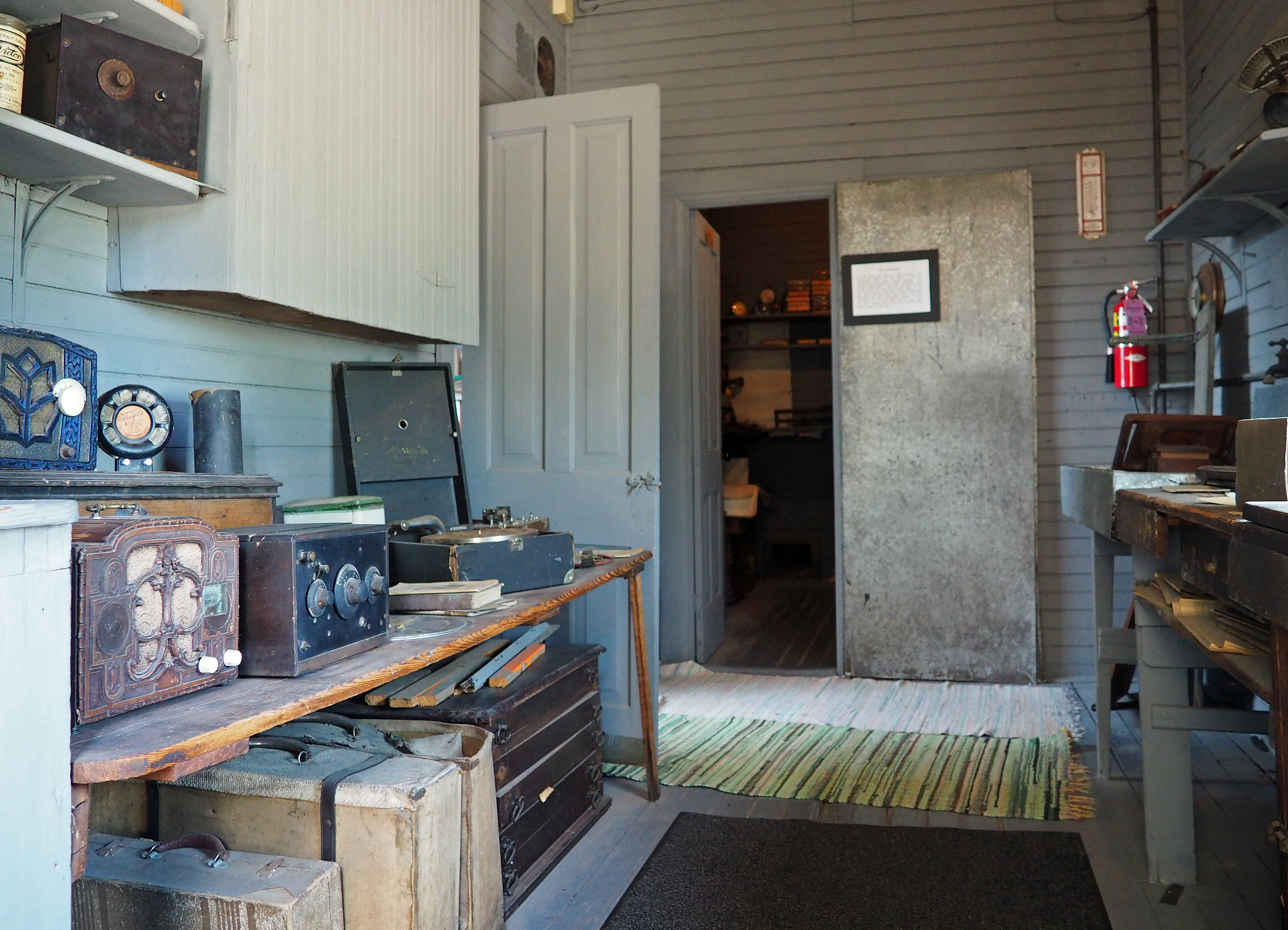
Photography workroom with darkroom beyond

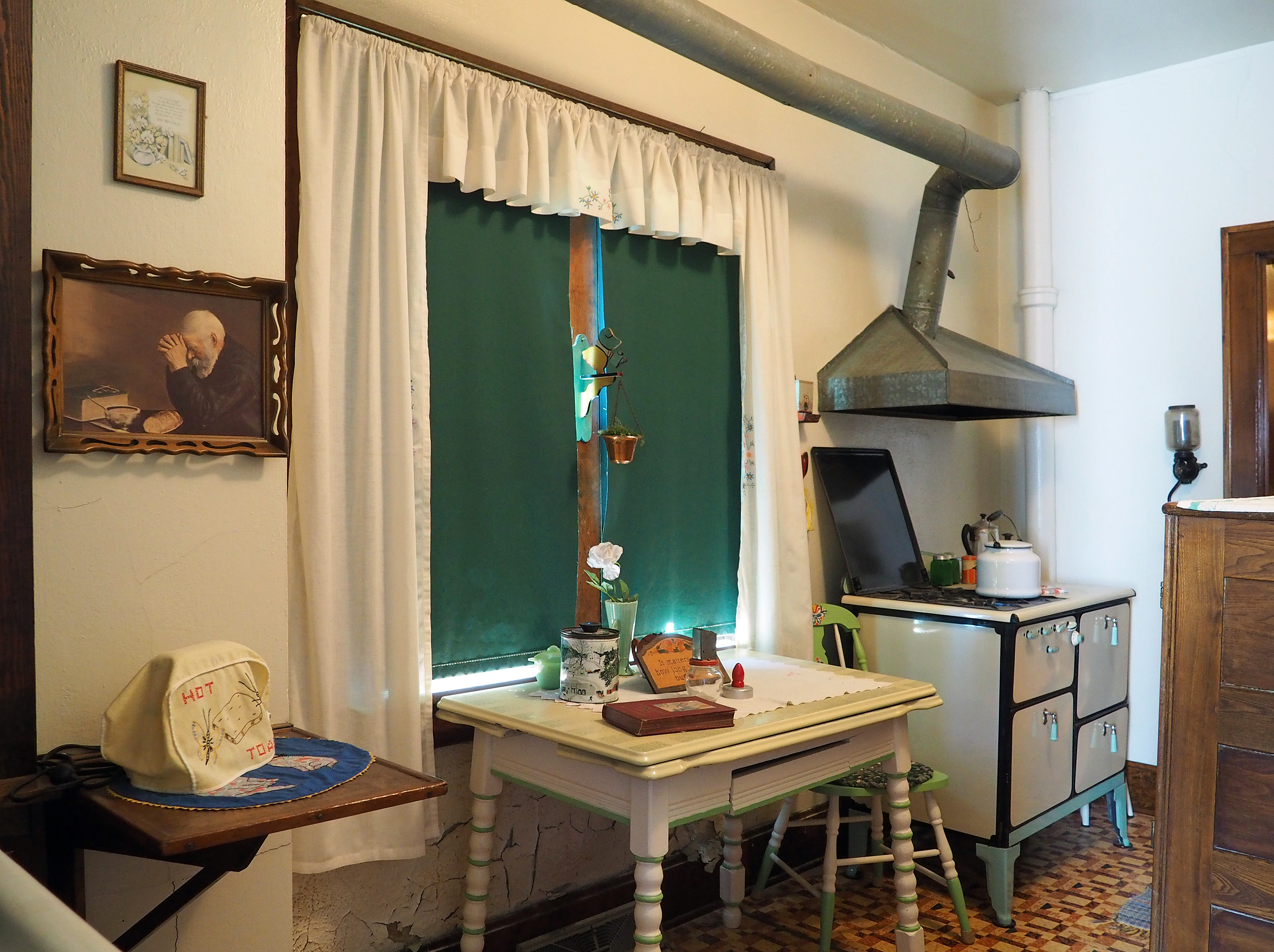
Kitchen

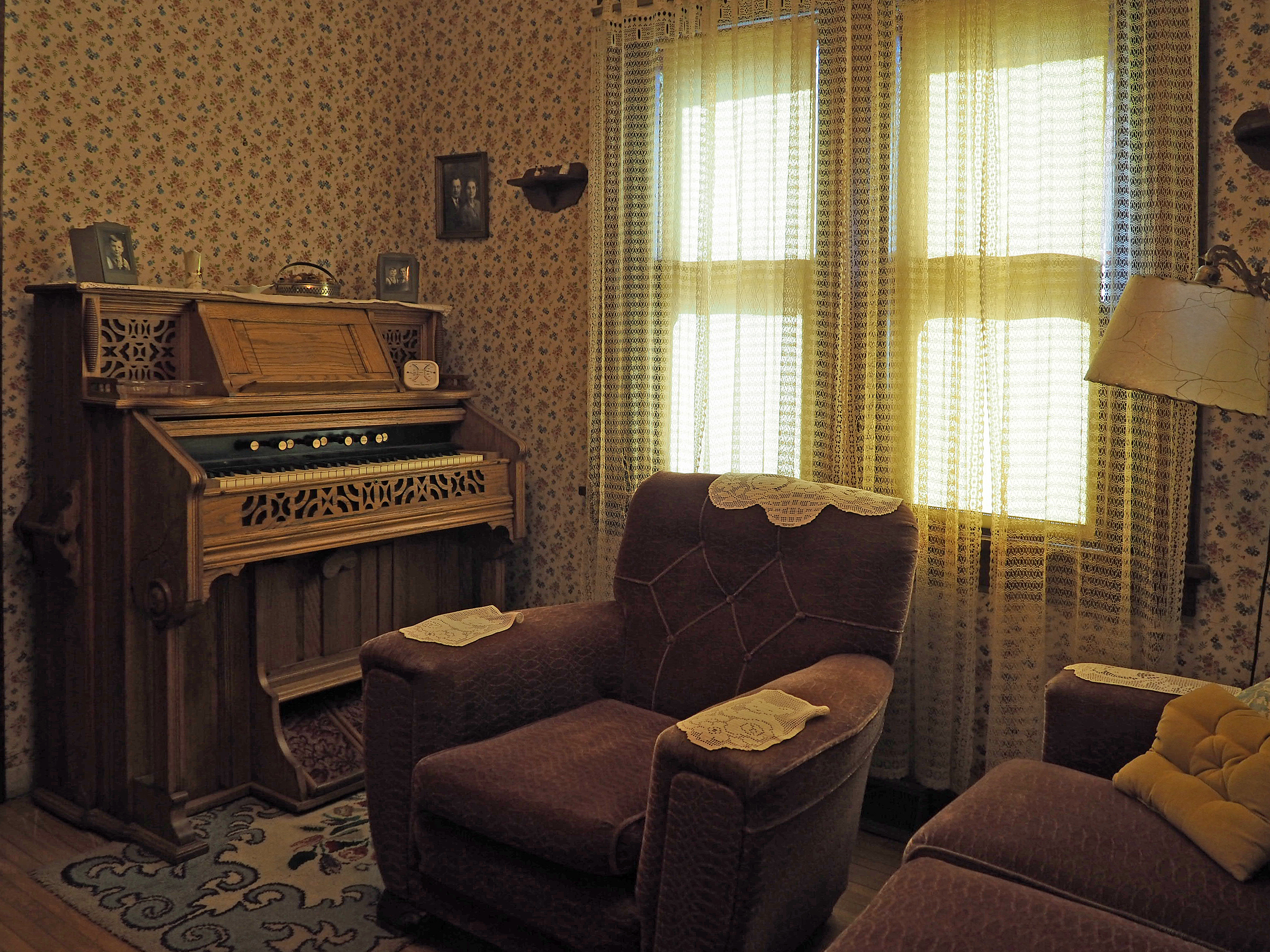
Living room

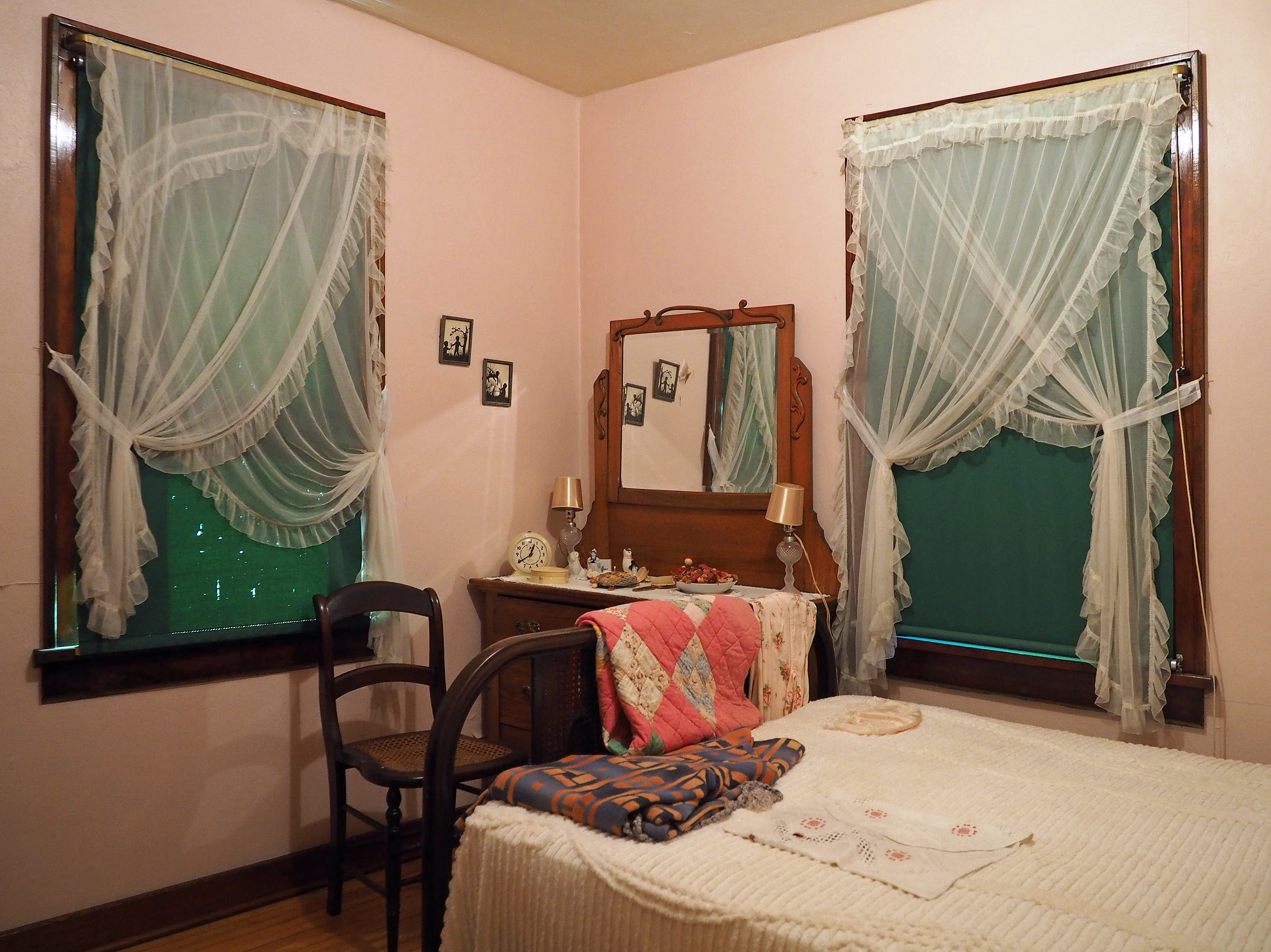
Bedroom

== See also ==
- List of museums in Minnesota
- List of museums devoted to one photographer
- National Register of Historic Places listings in Wright County, Minnesota

== Sources ==
- Lee, Carlton R. (2003). Cokato's First Century, 1878 - 1978.
