= Magnús T. Bernhardsson =

Professor of history

Magnús Thorkell Bernhardsson is the Brown Professor of History, as well as the Chair of the Global Studies Program at Williams College.

== Biography ==
Magnús T. Bernhardsson earned his Bachelor of Arts degree from the University of Iceland in 1990. He then pursued graduate studies at Yale University, obtaining a Master of Arts in Religion in 1992, followed by a Ph.D. in History in 1999.

Before joining Williams College in 2003, he spent four years teaching at Hofstra University.

== Selected works ==
- Reclaiming a Plundered Past. Archaeology and Nation Building in Modern Iraq (2005).
