= French Lake Township, Wright County, Minnesota =

French Lake Township, Minnesota
- Township
- Location within the state of Minnesota French Lake Township, Minnesota (the United States)
- Coordinates: 45°12′N 94°12′W
- Country: United States
- State: Minnesota
- County: Wright

Area
  - Total: 35.5 sq mi (91.9 km^{2})
  - Land: 33.5 sq mi (86.7 km^{2})
  - Water: 2.0 sq mi (5.2 km^{2})
- Elevation: 1,030 ft (314 m)

Population (2000)
  - Total: 1,130
  - Density: 34/sq mi (13/km^{2})
- Time zone: UTC-6 (Central (CST))
  - Summer (DST): UTC-5 (CDT)
- FIPS code: 27-22760
- GNIS feature ID: 0664231
- Website: https://www.frenchlaketownship.com/

French Lake Township is a township in Wright County, Minnesota, United States. The unincorporated community of French Lake is located within French Lake Township. The population was 1,130 at the 2000 census.

French Lake Township was organized in 1865, and named after French Lake.

== Geography ==
According to the United States Census Bureau, the township has a total area of 35.5 square miles (92 km^{2}), of which 33.5 square miles (87 km^{2}) is land and 2.0 square miles (5.2 km^{2}) (5.64%) is water.

French Lake Township is located in Township 120 North of the Arkansas Base Line and Range 28 West of the 5th Principal Meridian.

== Demographics ==
As of the census of 2000, there were 1,130 people, 405 households, and 311 families residing in the township. The population density was 33.8 inhabitants per square mile (13.1/km^{2}). There were 615 housing units at an average density of 18.4 per square mile (7.1/km^{2}). The racial makeup of the township was 98.50% White, 0.18% African American, 0.09% Native American, 0.27% Asian, and 0.97% from two or more races. Hispanic or Latino of any race were 0.27% of the population.

There were 405 households, out of which 33.8% had children under the age of 18 living with them, 69.1% were married couples living together, 4.4% had a female householder with no husband present, and 23.0% were non-families. 19.3% of all households were made up of individuals, and 7.7% had someone living alone who was 65 years of age or older. The average household size was 2.79 and the average family size was 3.23.

In the township the population was spread out, with 30.2% under the age of 18, 5.8% from 18 to 24, 27.1% from 25 to 44, 24.2% from 45 to 64, and 12.7% who were 65 years of age or older. The median age was 37 years. For every 100 females, there were 115.2 males. For every 100 females age 18 and over, there were 110.4 males.

The median income for a household in the township was $57,708, and the median income for a family was $60,625. Males had a median income of $41,635 versus $28,036 for females. The per capita income for the township was $23,488. About 4.9% of families and 8.3% of the population were below the poverty line, including 14.7% of those under age 18 and 3.3% of those age 65 or over.
