= French Lake (Wright County, Minnesota) =

Lake in the state of Minnesota, United States

- Location within Minnesota
- Location: Wright County, Minnesota
- Coordinates: 45°12′32″N 94°9′41″W
- Type: lake

French Lake is a lake in Wright County, in the U.S. state of Minnesota.

A large share of the early settlers near the lake being French Canadians caused the name to be selected.

== See also ==
- List of lakes in Minnesota
