= Cokato Township, Wright County, Minnesota =

Cokato Township, Minnesota
- Township
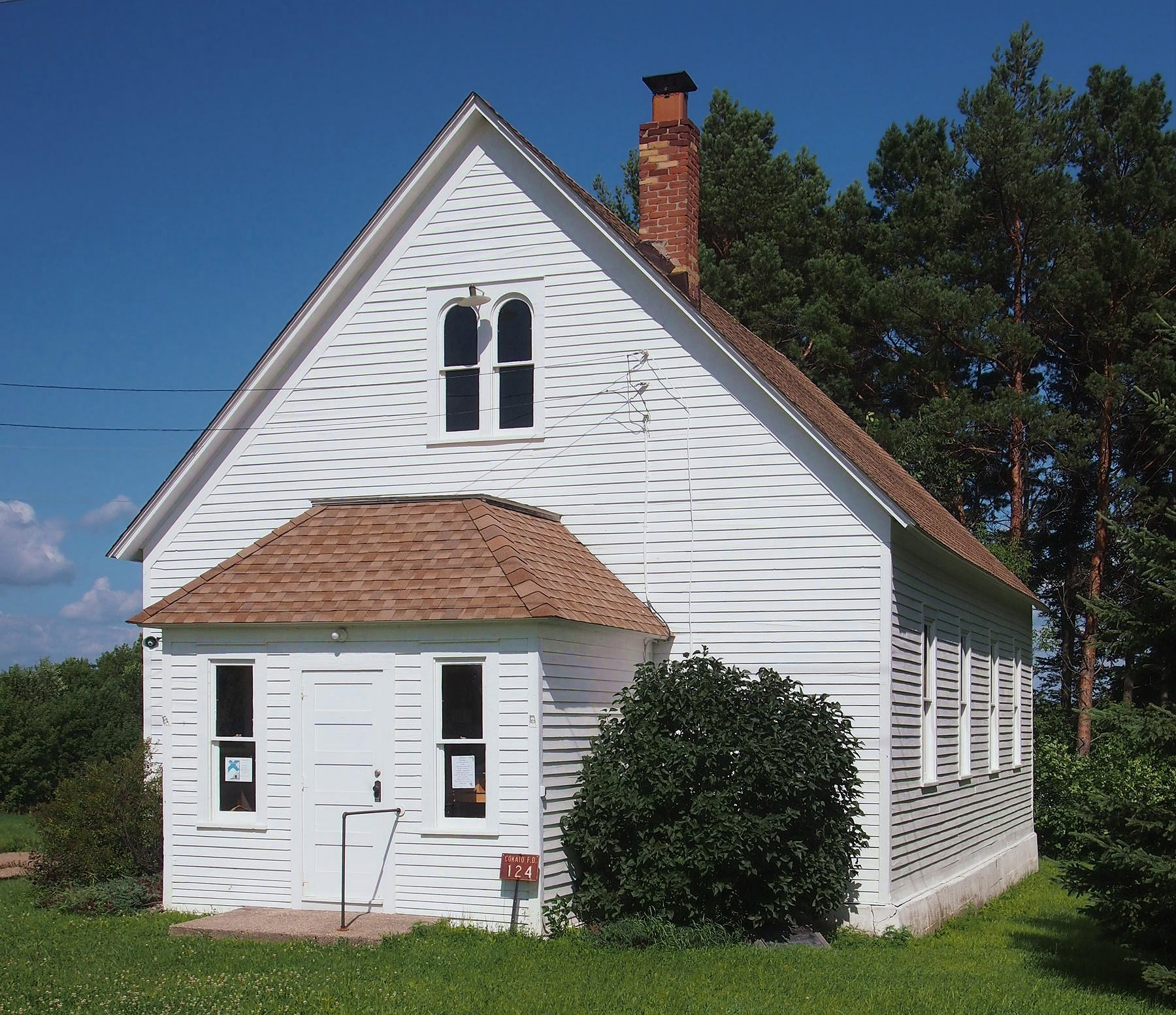
- Cokato Temperance Hall, a historic building in the township

- Location within the state of Minnesota Cokato Township, Minnesota (the United States)
- Coordinates: 45°6′N 94°12′W
- Country: United States
- State: Minnesota
- County: Wright

Area
  - Total: 34.4 sq mi (89.1 km^{2})
  - Land: 33.0 sq mi (85.4 km^{2})
  - Water: 1.4 sq mi (3.7 km^{2})
- Elevation: 997 ft (304 m)

Population (2000)
  - Total: 1,238
  - Density: 38/sq mi (14.5/km^{2})
- Time zone: UTC-6 (Central (CST))
  - Summer (DST): UTC-5 (CDT)
- ZIP code: 55321
- Area code: 320
- FIPS code: 27-12448
- GNIS feature ID: 0663843
- Website: https://cokatotownship.com/

Cokato Township is a township in Wright County, Minnesota, United States. The population was 1,238 at the 2000 census. Cokato Township was organized in 1868, and named for the Sioux language word meaning "at the middle". The 1896 Cokato Temperance Hall is listed on the National Register of Historic Places.

== Geography ==
According to the United States Census Bureau, the township has a total area of 34.4 square miles (89 km^{2}), of which 33.0 square miles (85 km^{2}) is land and 1.4 square miles (3.6 km^{2}) (4.10%) is water.

The city of Cokato is located within Cokato Township geographically but is a separate entity.

Cokato Township is located in Township 119 North of the Arkansas Base Line and Range 28 West of the 5th Principal Meridian.

== Demographics ==
As of the census of 2000, there were 1,238 people, 319 households, and 262 families residing in the township. The population density was 37.5 inhabitants per square mile (14.5/km^{2}). There were 348 housing units at an average density of 10.5 per square mile (4.1/km^{2}). The racial makeup of the township was 98.55% White, 0.16% African American, 0.16% Asian, 0.08% from other races, and 1.05% from two or more races. Hispanic or Latino of any race were 0.48% of the population. 38.9% were of Finnish, 17.4% German, 15.0% Swedish, 8.4% Norwegian and 6.3% Irish ancestry according to Census 2000.

There were 319 households, out of which 49.8% had children under the age of 18 living with them, 75.5% were married couples living together, 3.4% had a female householder with no husband present, and 17.6% were non-families. 14.7% of all households were made up of individuals, and 4.7% had someone living alone who was 65 years of age or older. The average household size was 3.88 and the average family size was 4.38.

In the township the population was spread out, with 43.2% under the age of 18, 8.7% from 18 to 24, 24.0% from 25 to 44, 17.2% from 45 to 64, and 6.9% who were 65 years of age or older. The median age was 22 years. For every 100 females, there were 110.5 males. For every 100 females age 18 and over, there were 108.0 males.

The median income for a household in the township was $50,139, and the median income for a family was $56,250. Males had a median income of $35,938 versus $21,776 for females. The per capita income for the township was $15,863. About 2.8% of families and 5.5% of the population were below the poverty line, including 7.0% of those under age 18 and 6.0% of those age 65 or over.
