= Annandale, Minnesota =

City in Minnesota, United States

Annandale
- City
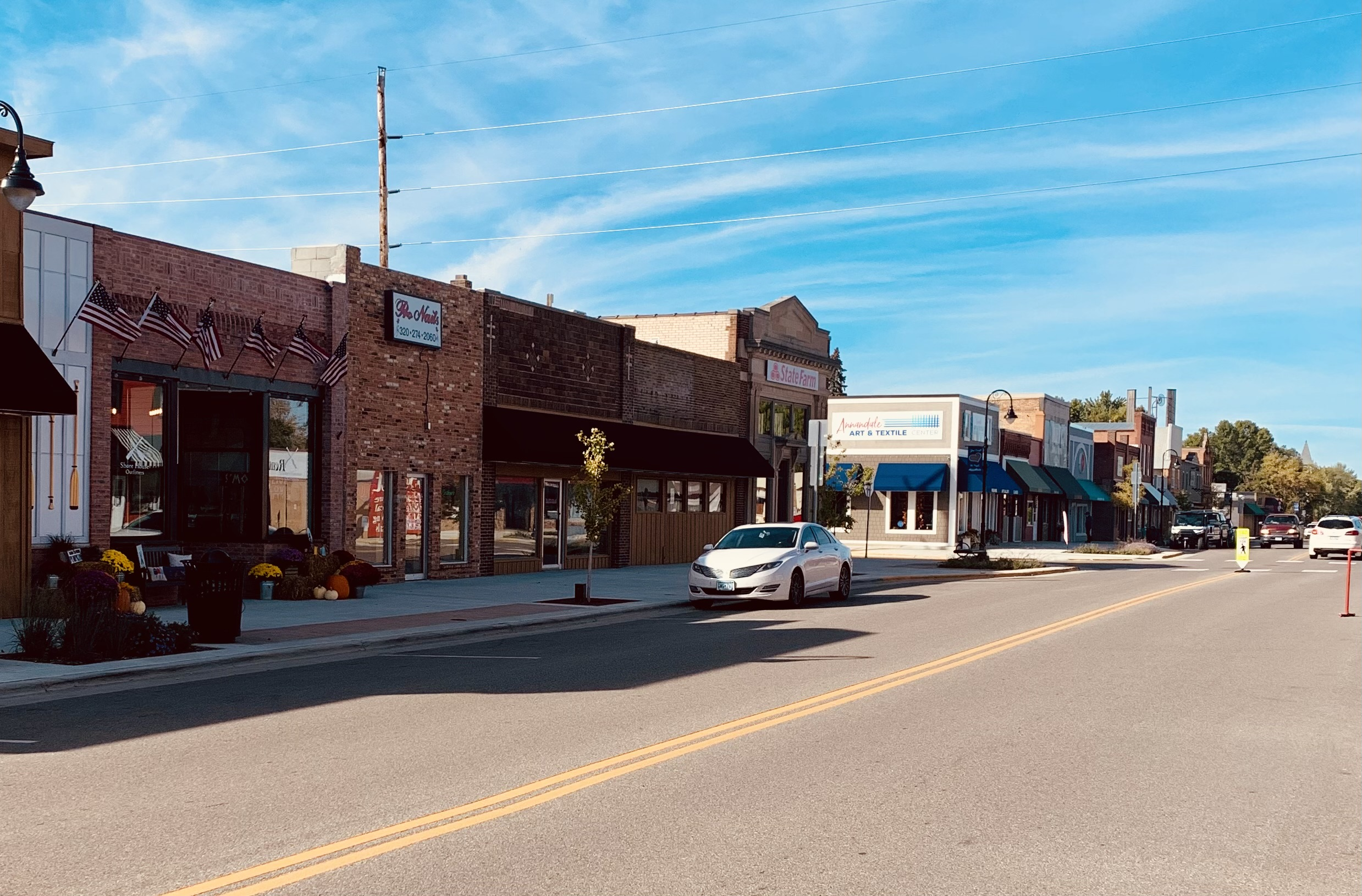
- Downtown Annandale

- Location of the city of Annandale within Wright County, Minnesota
- Coordinates: 45°16′N 94°7′W
- Country: United States
- State: Minnesota
- County: Wright

Government
  - Mayor: Shelly Jonas

Area
  - Total: 3.01 sq mi (7.79 km^{2})
  - Land: 3.01 sq mi (7.79 km^{2})
  - Water: 0 sq mi (0.00 km^{2})
- Elevation: 1,070 ft (326 m)

Population (2020)
  - Total: 3,330
  - Density: 1,106.6/sq mi (427.26/km^{2})
- Time zone: UTC-6 (Central (CST))
  - Summer (DST): UTC-5 (CDT)
- ZIP code: 55302
- Area code: 320
- FIPS code: 27-01684
- GNIS feature ID: 0639390
- Website: www.annandale.mn.us

Annandale (/ˈænəndeɪl/ AN-ən-dayl) is a city in Wright County, Minnesota, United States. The population was 3,330 at the 2020 census.

Annandale has been dubbed "The Heart of the Lakes" because it has 26 lakes within a 10-mile (16 km) radius.

== History ==
Annandale was platted in 1886, and named after Annan, Scotland. A post office has been in operation at Annandale since 1887. Annandale was incorporated in 1888. One property in Annandale, the 1895 Thayer Hotel, is on the National Register of Historic Places.

== Geography ==
According to the United States Census Bureau, the city has a total area of 2.98 square miles (7.72 km^{2}), all land.

Minnesota State Highways 24 and 55 are two of the main routes in the city.

Annandale is located 50 miles northwest of Minneapolis; and 25 miles south of Saint Cloud. There are also 26 area lakes within a 10-mile radius of Annandale.

== Education ==
The Annandale School District serves children and adults in the school district in four different school sites. These include Annandale High School, Annandale Middle School, Annandale Elementary School, and Community Education Center.

== Demographics ==
Historical population
Census	Pop.	Note	%±
1890	211		—
1900	481		128.0%
1910	624		29.7%
1920	644		3.2%
1930	663		3.0%
1940	755		13.9%
1950	899		19.1%
1960	984		9.5%
1970	1,234		25.4%
1980	1,568		27.1%
1990	2,054		31.0%
2000	2,684		30.7%
2010	3,228		20.3%
2020	3,330		3.2%
U.S. Decennial Census

=== 2020 census ===
As of the 2020 census, Annandale had a population of 3,330. The median age was 41.0 years. 23.9% of residents were under the age of 18 and 22.6% of residents were 65 years of age or older. For every 100 females there were 92.8 males, and for every 100 females age 18 and over there were 89.3 males age 18 and over.

0.0% of residents lived in urban areas, while 100.0% lived in rural areas.

There were 1,416 households in Annandale, of which 28.7% had children under the age of 18 living in them. Of all households, 44.0% were married-couple households, 19.0% were households with a male householder and no spouse or partner present, and 30.3% were households with a female householder and no spouse or partner present. About 33.5% of all households were made up of individuals and 17.8% had someone living alone who was 65 years of age or older.

There were 1,560 housing units, of which 9.2% were vacant. The homeowner vacancy rate was 2.5% and the rental vacancy rate was 7.3%.

Racial composition as of the 2020 census
Race	Number	Percent
White	3,081	92.5%
Black or African American	17	0.5%
American Indian and Alaska Native	9	0.3%
Asian	18	0.5%
Native Hawaiian and Other Pacific Islander	1	0.0%
Some other race	57	1.7%
Two or more races	147	4.4%
Hispanic or Latino (of any race)	104	3.1%

=== 2010 census ===
As of the census of 2010, there were 3,228 people, 1,338 households, and 819 families living in the city. The population density was 1,083.2 inhabitants per square mile (418.2/km^{2}). There were 1,450 housing units at an average density of 486.6 per square mile (187.9/km^{2}). The racial makeup of the city was 96.3% White, 0.5% African American, 0.2% Native American, 0.3% Asian, 1.5% from other races, and 1.2% from two or more races. Hispanic or Latino of any race were 3.1% of the population.

There were 1,338 households, of which 32.0% had children under the age of 18 living with them, 46.0% were married couples living together, 10.8% had a female householder with no husband present, 4.3% had a male householder with no wife present, and 38.8% were non-families. 33.2% of all households were made up of individuals, and 15.7% had someone living alone who was 65 years of age or older. The average household size was 2.33 and the average family size was 2.96.

The median age in the city was 38.8 years. 24.9% of residents were under the age of 18; 7.1% were between the ages of 18 and 24; 26.5% were from 25 to 44; 22.9% were from 45 to 64; and 18.6% were 65 years of age or older. The gender makeup of the city was 47.6% male and 52.4% female.

=== 2000 census ===
At the 2000 census, there were 2,684 people, 1,098 households and 698 families living in the city. The population density was 990.3 inhabitants per square mile (382.4/km^{2}). There were 1,163 housing units at an average density of 429.1 per square mile (165.7/km^{2}). The racial makeup of the city was 97.50% White, 0.37% African American, 0.19% Native American, 0.26% Asian, 0.30% from other races, and 1.38% from two or more races. Hispanic or Latino of any race were 0.97% of the population. 43.0% were of German, 10.8% Norwegian, 8.3% Swedish, 7.4% Irish and 5.9% Finnish ancestry according to Census 2000.

There were 1,098 households, of which 33.1% had children under the age of 18 living with them, 47.6% were married couples living together, 11.7% had a female householder with no husband present, and 36.4% were non-families. 31.4% of all households were made up of individuals, and 17.0% had someone living alone who was 65 years of age or older. The average household size was 2.39 and the average family size was 3.03.

27.3% of the population were under the age of 18, 8.5% from 18 to 24, 29.1% from 25 to 44, 17.9% from 45 to 64, and 17.2% who were 65 years of age or older. The median age was 34 years. For every 100 females, there were 88.7 males. For every 100 females age 18 and over, there were 85.0 males.

The median household income was $37,929 and the median family income was $48,667. Males had a median income of $35,223 compared with $25,161 for females. The per capita income for the city was $18,876. About 9.1% of families and 12.1% of the population were below the poverty line, including 17.8% of those under age 18 and 12.9% of those age 65 or over.

== Government ==
Annandale uses a city council consisting of four councilmembers and the city mayor. As of January 2021, the current mayor of Annandale is Shelly Jonas.

== Public services ==
The Annandale Area Fire Department serves the city of Annandale and the townships of Albion, Corinna, French Lake, Lynden and Southside.

The Annandale Police Department serves the city of Annandale and its surrounding communities.

== Notable people ==
- Dean Barkley (b. 1950) – former U.S. Senator
