= Albion Township, Wright County, Minnesota =

Albion Township, Minnesota
- Township
- Location within the state of Minnesota Albion Township, Minnesota (the United States)
- Coordinates: 45°11′46″N 94°4′20″W
- Country: United States
- State: Minnesota
- County: Wright

Area
  - Total: 35.5 sq mi (91.9 km^{2})
  - Land: 32.5 sq mi (84.2 km^{2})
  - Water: 3.0 sq mi (7.7 km^{2})
- Elevation: 1,033 ft (315 m)

Population (2000)
  - Total: 1,146
  - Density: 35/sq mi (13.6/km^{2})
- Time zone: UTC-6 (Central (CST))
  - Summer (DST): UTC-5 (CDT)
- FIPS code: 27-00766
- GNIS feature ID: 0663405
- Website: https://albiontownship.com/

Albion Township is a township in Wright County, Minnesota, United States. The population was 1,146 at the 2000 census.

Albion Township was organized in 1858, and named Albion, the archaic name for England.

== Geography ==
According to the United States Census Bureau, the township has a total area of 35.5 square miles (92 km^{2}), of which 32.5 square miles (84 km^{2}) is land and 3.0 square miles (7.8 km^{2}) (8.37%) is water.

== Demographics ==
As of the census of 2000, there were 1,146 people, 398 households, and 319 families residing in the township. The population density was 35.3 inhabitants per square mile (13.6/km^{2}). There were 461 housing units at an average density of 14.2/sq mi (5.5/km^{2}). The racial makeup of the township was 99.21% White, 0.17% Native American, 0.17% Asian, 0.09% from other races, and 0.35% from two or more races. Hispanic or Latino of any race were 0.70% of the population.

There were 398 households, out of which 37.2% had children under the age of 18 living with them, 73.1% were married couples living together, 2.8% had a female householder with no husband present, and 19.8% were non-families. 14.1% of all households were made up of individuals, and 5.5% had someone living alone who was 65 years of age or older. The average household size was 2.88 and the average family size was 3.23.

In the township the population was spread out, with 28.8% under the age of 18, 7.9% from 18 to 24, 26.8% from 25 to 44, 25.4% from 45 to 64, and 11.2% who were 65 years of age or older. The median age was 37 years. For every 100 females, there were 119.1 males. For every 100 females age 18 and over, there were 114.7 males.

The median income for a household in the township was $52,339, and the median income for a family was $56,146. Males had a median income of $36,838 versus $23,958 for females. The per capita income for the township was $22,840. About 2.8% of families and 4.7% of the population were below the poverty line, including 7.0% of those under age 18 and 5.5% of those age 65 or over.
