= Cokato, Minnesota =

City in Minnesota, United States

Cokato
- City
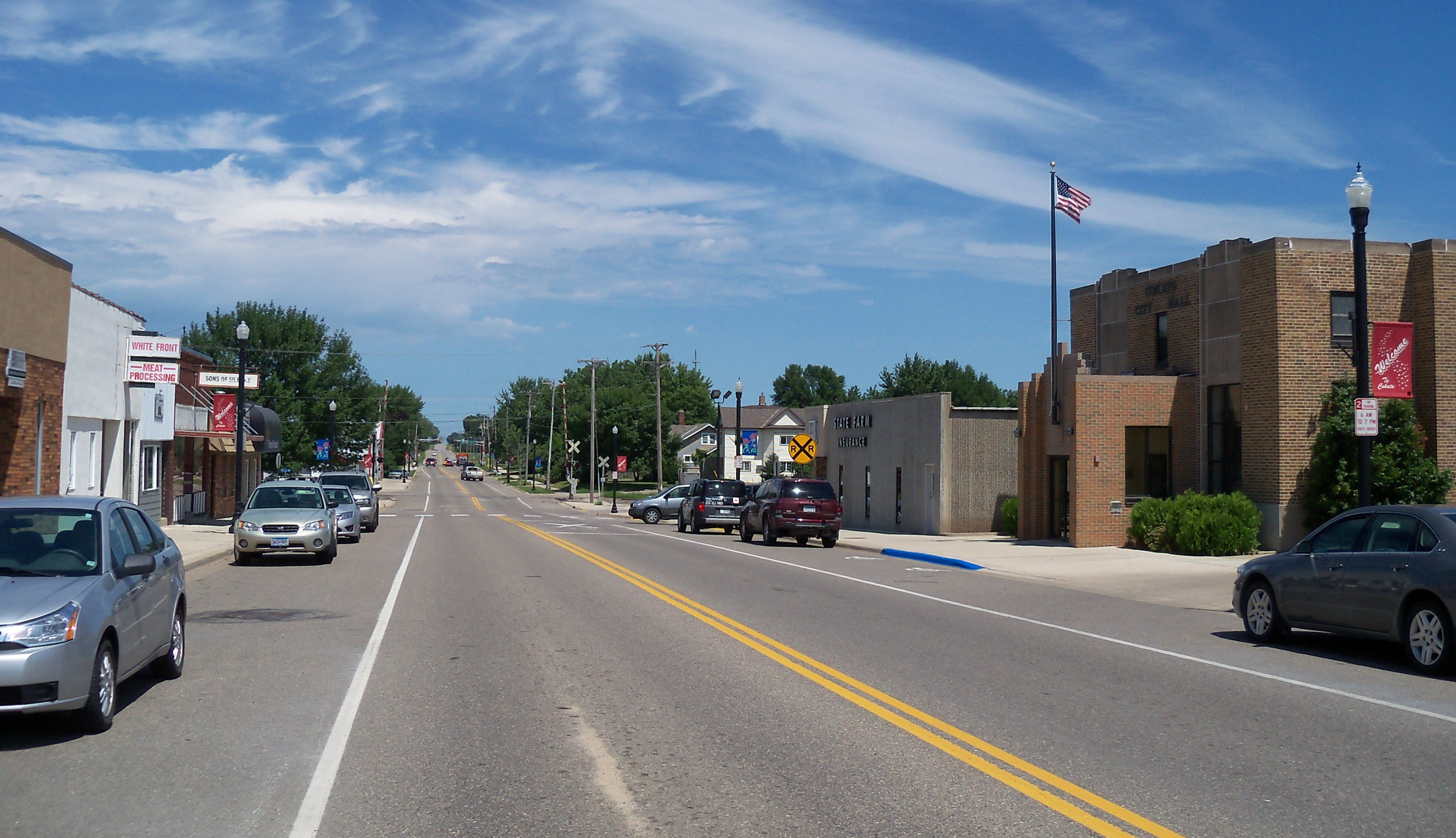
- Downtown Cokato
- Motto: "In the midst of opportunity"
- Location of the city of Cokato within Wright County, Minnesota
- Coordinates: 45°4′32″N 94°11′21″W
- Country: United States
- State: Minnesota
- County: Wright
- Founded: 1869
- Incorporated: 1878

Government
  - Mayor: Carl Harju

Area
  - Total: 1.56 sq mi (4.03 km^{2})
  - Land: 1.56 sq mi (4.03 km^{2})
  - Water: 0.0039 sq mi (0.01 km^{2})
- Elevation: 1,056 ft (322 m)

Population (2020)
  - Total: 2,799
  - Estimate (2021): 2,775
  - Density: 1,800.2/sq mi (695.06/km^{2})
- Time zone: UTC-6 (CST)
  - Summer (DST): UTC-5 (CDT)
- ZIP code: 55321
- Area code: 320
- FIPS code: 27-12430
- GNIS feature ID: 0641381
- Website: cokato.mn.us

Cokato (/koʊˈkeɪtoʊ/ koh-KAY-toh) is a city in Wright County, Minnesota, United States. The population was 2,799 at the 2020 census.

== History ==
Cokato was founded in 1869 when the First Division of the St. Paul & Pacific Railroad was extended to that point. The city was named after a Dakota word meaning 'amid'. Cokato was incorporated as a village in 1878.

== Geography ==
According to the United States Census Bureau, the city has an area of 1.56 square miles (4.04 km^{2}), all land.

== Demographics ==
Historical population
Census	Pop.	Note	%±
1880	274		—
1890	363		32.5%
1900	684		88.4%
1910	718		5.0%
1920	1,014		41.2%
1930	1,125		10.9%
1940	1,175		4.4%
1950	1,403		19.4%
1960	1,356		−3.3%
1970	1,735		27.9%
1980	2,056		18.5%
1990	2,180		6.0%
2000	2,727		25.1%
2010	2,694		−1.2%
2020	2,799		3.9%
2021 (est.)	2,775		−0.9%
U.S. Decennial Census

=== 2020 census ===
As of the 2020 census, Cokato had a population of 2,799. The median age was 38.2 years. 27.6% of residents were under the age of 18 and 20.1% of residents were 65 years of age or older. For every 100 females there were 89.6 males, and for every 100 females age 18 and over there were 86.6 males age 18 and over.

0.0% of residents lived in urban areas, while 100.0% lived in rural areas.

There were 1,054 households in Cokato, of which 32.5% had children under the age of 18 living in them. Of all households, 46.0% were married-couple households, 17.2% were households with a male householder and no spouse or partner present, and 30.7% were households with a female householder and no spouse or partner present. About 32.4% of all households were made up of individuals and 16.6% had someone living alone who was 65 years of age or older.

There were 1,120 housing units, of which 5.9% were vacant. The homeowner vacancy rate was 0.9% and the rental vacancy rate was 5.2%.

Racial composition as of the 2020 census
Race	Number	Percent
White	2,525	90.2%
Black or African American	25	0.9%
American Indian and Alaska Native	14	0.5%
Asian	13	0.5%
Native Hawaiian and Other Pacific Islander	0	0.0%
Some other race	59	2.1%
Two or more races	163	5.8%
Hispanic or Latino (of any race)	134	4.8%

=== 2010 census ===
As of the census of 2010, there were 2,694 people in 1,000 households, including 652 families, in the city. The population density was 1,726.9 inhabitants per square mile (666.8/km^{2}). There were 1,103 housing units at an average density of 707.1 per square mile (273.0/km^{2}). The racial makeup of the city was 95.0% White, 0.3% African American, 0.5% Native American, 0.5% Asian, 2.3% from other races, and 1.4% from two or more races. Hispanic or Latino residents of any race were 4.3% of the population.

Of the 1,000 households 36.9% had children under the age of 18 living with them, 50.4% were married couples living together, 10.7% had a female householder with no husband present, 4.1% had a male householder with no wife present, and 34.8% were non-families. 30.1% of households were one person and 15.5% were one person aged 65 or older. The average household size was 2.61 and the average family size was 3.29.

The median age was 32.5 years. 31.8% of residents were under the age of 18; 6.9% were between the ages of 18 and 24; 25.6% were from 25 to 44; 20.6% were from 45 to 64; and 15.2% were 65 or older. The gender makeup of the city was 48.4% male and 51.6% female.

=== 2000 census ===
As of the census of 2000, there were 2,727 people in 990 households, including 663 families, in the city. The population density was 2,125.8 inhabitants per square mile (820.8/km^{2}). There were 1,035 housing units at an average density of 806.8 per square mile (311.5/km^{2}). The racial makeup of the city was 96.81% White, 0.15% African American, 0.26% Native American, 0.44% Asian, 0.04% Pacific Islander, 1.25% from other races, and 1.06% from two or more races. Hispanic or Latino residents of any race were 2.68%. 29.5% were of German, 24.2% Finnish, 15.3% Swedish and 9.8% Norwegian ancestry.

Of the 990 households 36.6% had children under the age of 18 living with them, 51.1% were married couples living together, 11.2% had a female householder with no husband present, and 33.0% were non-families. 29.7% of households were one person and 17.0% were one person aged 65 or older. The average household size was 2.66 and the average family size was 3.33.

The age distribution was 31.8% under the age of 18, 8.4% from 18 to 24, 25.4% from 25 to 44, 16.9% from 45 to 64, and 17.5% 65 or older. The median age was 33 years. For every 100 females, there were 91.5 males. For every 100 females age 18 and over, there were 90.3 males.

The median household income was $39,613 and the median family income was $51,645. Males had a median income of $35,362 versus $21,484 for females. The per capita income for the city was $17,149. About 7.1% of families and 7.7% of the population were below the poverty line, including 7.5% of those under age 18 and 14.9% of those age 65 or over.

== Arts and culture ==
Cokato is home to the Cokato Museum & Gust Akerlund Studio. The museum is a local history museum chronicling the story of the people of Cokato and the surrounding townships in southwest Wright County. The Akerlund Studio is a restored photography studio, and home of Gust Akerlund, who operated it during the early 20th century.

Since 1950, Cokato has hosted the Cokato Corn Carnival annually during the second week of August in Peterson Park, near Cokato Elementary School. The festival's highlight is the serving of free corn-on-the-cob, along with a parade, midway and carnival rides, musical entertainment, the Miss Cokato coronation, and other events.

The Aho family of Cokato was featured by journalist Steve Hartman on CBS News Sunday Morning on December 9, 2012, for having 12 sons who all played football at the local high school over more than two decades.

The Miss Cokato Royalty program is a scholarship program offered to girls ages 16-18. This program encourages leadership, volunteerism, and an overall pride in one's community. The royalty program is a part of the larger umbrella of the Minneapolis Aquatennial Organization, another scholarship program for young women of Minnesota.

== Government ==
=== Presidential elections ===
Precinct Results
Year	Republican	Democratic	Third parties
2020	68.7% 1,002	28.9% 421	2.4% 36
2016	63.4% 857	26.2% 354	10.4% 140
2012	58.2% 784	38.3% 516	3.5% 48
2008	60.1% 827	36.4% 501	3.5% 49
2004	62.2% 863	35.1% 487	2.7% 37
2000	58.6% 776	35.3% 467	6.1% 81
1996	44.2% 527	43.5% 518	12.3% 146
1992	39.2% 479	35.9% 438	24.9% 304
1988	55.1% 593	44.9% 484	0.0% 0
1984	58.4% 635	41.6% 452	0.0% 0
1980	51.4% 563	41.6% 455	7.0% 77
1976	54.5% 568	43.1% 449	2.4% 25
1968	54.5% 472	43.8% 379	1.7% 15
1964	52.2% 405	47.8% 371	0.0% 0
1960	73.2% 569	26.5% 206	0.3% 2

== Education ==
Cokato is part of the Dassel-Cokato School District, ISD #466.

== Infrastructure ==
U.S. Highway 12 serves as a main route in the city. The BNSF Railway serves the community as a part of the Wayzata Subdivision.

== Notable people ==
The historic studio of noted Cokato photographer Gust Akerlund

- Sydney Eckman Ahlstrom – university professor and historian of American religion. Graduate of Gustavus Adolphus College (B.A., 1941), the University of Minnesota (M.A., 1946), and Harvard University (Ph.D., 1952). Joined the history faculty of Yale University in 1954, where he taught until his retirement in 1984. In 1972 he published A Religious History of the American People; this landmark study won the National Book Award for Philosophy and Religion in 1973. Made a fellow of the American Academy of Arts and Sciences in 1978. Born in Cokato 1919; Cokato High School class of 1937.
- David Bromstad – interior designer and television personality. In 2006 he won the first season of HGTV Design Star. He is the host of Color Splash with David Bromstad, which debuted in 2007 on HGTV. He has also hosted HGTV's Color Splash Miami and My Lottery Dream Home. Born in Cokato 1973.
- George August Borg - businessman and Minnesota state legislator
- Steve Knapp – driver on the USF2000 and IndyCar circuits. USF2000 season champion in 1996. Competed in the Indianapolis 500 from 1998 to 2000. As one of only three drivers to complete all 200 laps of the 1998 Indianapolis 500, Knapp finished behind only Eddie Cheever and Buddy Lazier and won rookie of the year. Owns and operates Elite Engines, designer and manufacturer of customized racing power plants, in West Bend, WI. Dassel-Cokato High School class of 1982.
