= National Register of Historic Places listings in Meeker County, Minnesota =

Location of Meeker County in Minnesota

This is a list of the National Register of Historic Places listings in Meeker County, Minnesota.

This is intended to be a complete list of the properties and districts on the National Register of Historic Places in Meeker County, Minnesota, United States. The locations of National Register properties and districts for which the latitude and longitude coordinates are included below, may be seen in an online map.

There are 11 properties and districts listed on the National Register in the county. Another property was once listed but has been removed.

This National Park Service list is complete through NPS recent listings posted July 10, 2026.

== Current listings ==
| | Name on the Register | Image | Date listed | Location | City or town | Description |
|---|---|---|---|---|---|---|
| 1 | Henry Ames House | Henry Ames House | August 9, 1984 (#84001623) | 63150 277th St. 45°08′54″N 94°29′55″W | Darwin Township | Farmhouse built 1888–89 by prosperous local brickmaker Henry Ames (1846–1928), whose on-site brickyard was Meeker County's leading industry for almost two decades. |
| 2 | Bridge No. 90980 | Bridge No. 90980 | January 9, 1997 (#96001560) | 690th Ave. over the North Fork of the Crow River; 45°12′08″N 94°22′45″W | Kingston Township | One of Minnesota's earliest steel truss bridges, built in 1899 by the Hewett Bridge Company, an important Minneapolis-based manufacturer at the turn of the 20th century. |
| 3 | Brightwood Beach Cottage | Brightwood Beach Cottage | May 22, 1978 (#78001551) | S. Ripley Dr. 45°05′54″N 94°32′22″W | Litchfield Township | Octagonal summer cottage built for a lake resort in 1889, Minnesota's only surviving example of the octagon house fad applied to a rental property and the best representative of the short-lived resort's facilities. |
| 4 | District No. 48 School | District No. 48 School | January 25, 1997 (#96001612) | 17757 745th Ave. 45°03′54″N 94°15′40″W | Collinwood Township | One-room school active 1870–1961, a remnant of early Euro-American settlement and education in rural Minnesota. |
| 5 | Grand Army of the Republic Hall | Grand Army of the Republic Hall | May 21, 1975 (#75000995) | 370 N. Marshall St. 45°07′45″N 94°31′35″W | Litchfield | Fortress-like hall built in 1885 by Civil War Union veterans to house a private reading library and museum; one of the finest buildings associated with influential late 19th-century fraternal society Grand Army of the Republic. Now part of the Meeker County Historical Society Museum. |
| 6 | Litchfield Commercial Historic District | Litchfield Commercial Historic District | March 1, 1996 (#96000192) | N. Sibley Ave. between Depot and 3rd Sts. 45°07′39″N 94°31′41″W | Litchfield | Unusually intact business district of a small Midwestern agricultural trade center of the late 19th and early 20th centuries, with 36 contributing properties mostly built between 1882 and 1940. |
| 7 | Litchfield Opera House | Litchfield Opera House | October 4, 1984 (#84000019) | 136 N. Marshall Ave. 45°07′38″N 94°31′35″W | Litchfield | Long-serving community center, built as a theater in 1900 and remodeled in the 1930s to house civic offices and public meeting space. |
| 8 | Ness Lutheran Church and Cemetery | Ness Lutheran Church and Cemetery | May 20, 2025 (#100011871) | 24040 580th Ave. 45°05′43″N 94°36′15″W | Litchfield Township | Church complex dating to 1857; typical of the Norwegian immigrant experience and ecclesiastical architecture. An 1878 monument to the first five White victims of the Dakota War of 1862 commemorates a major event in early Meeker County history. |
| 9 | Pipe Lake Fort | Pipe Lake Fort | June 26, 2003 (#03000576) | Off County Rd. 1; 44°55′56″N 94°35′44″W | Cedar Mills Township | Best preserved example of 12 sod forts built and briefly manned by the U.S. Army across southwest Minnesota in the year after the Dakota War of 1862. |
| 10 | Trinity Episcopal Church | Trinity Episcopal Church | June 20, 1975 (#75000996) | 400 N. Sibley Ave. 45°07′48″N 94°31′40″W | Litchfield | Superlative Carpenter Gothic church built in 1871, believed to have been designed by Richard Upjohn. |
| 11 | Universal Laboratories Building | Universal Laboratories Building | March 1, 1996 (#96000191) | 901 1st St. N. 45°05′10″N 94°18′28″W | Dassel | Processing facility that became the nation's first and most important domestic supplier of ergot—source of many vital drugs, particularly in wartime—beginning in 1937 just as the impending World War II was cutting off foreign purveyors. Now a museum. |

== Former listing ==
| | Name on the Register | Image | Date listed | Date removed | Location | City or town | Description |
|---|---|---|---|---|---|---|---|
| 1 | West End Elevator | | March 14, 1985 (#85000556) | November 30, 1987 | 4th Street and Atlantic Avenue | Dassel | 1885 grain elevator. Burned down in 1987. |

Additionally, Bridge No. 5388 was originally listed in Meeker County but was relocated to Mower County in 2011.

== See also ==
- List of National Historic Landmarks in Minnesota
- National Register of Historic Places listings in Minnesota
