= Steelesville Cemetery =

Historic cemetery in Dassel, Minnesota, U.S.

Coordinates: 45.05203°N 94.30188°W

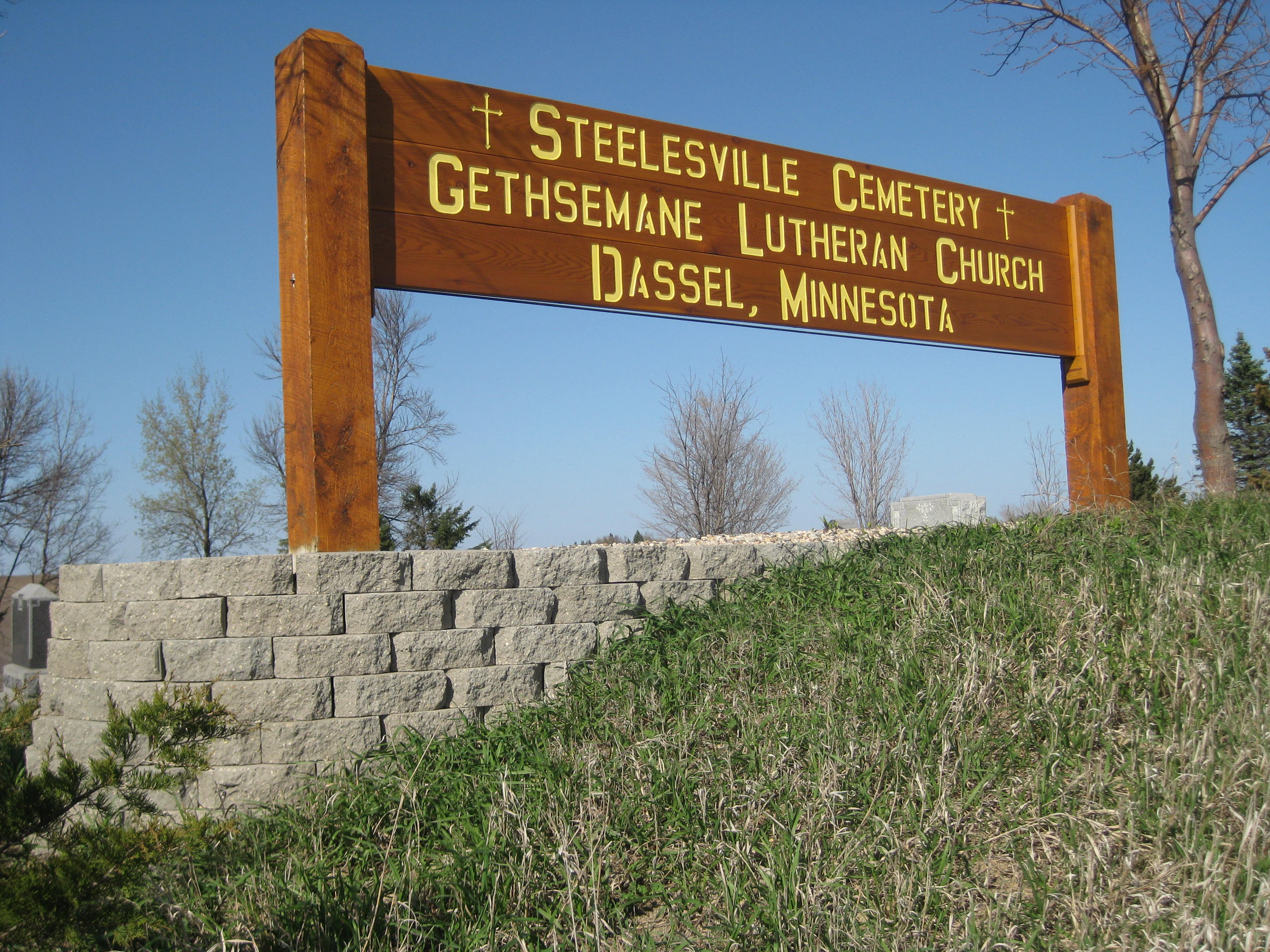
- Sign at Steelesville Cemetery
- Interactive map of Steelesville Cemetery

Details
- Location: 21112 728th Avenue, Dassel, Minnesota

Steelesville Cemetery is located at 21112 728th Avenue, two miles south of Dassel, Minnesota and is property of Gethsemane Lutheran Church, Dassel, Minnesota. The cemetery is maintained and operated by the Steelesville Cemetery Association, a nonprofit organization incorporated in 1970, composed of interested friends, families, neighbors and church members. This one-acre cemetery, located among the hills of Collinwood Township, is long in history going back to 1878. As of April 2012, there were 249 people interred within the grounds of Steelesville Cemetery. Many of the deceased laid to rest in Steelesville Cemetery are among the original Swedish pioneers, along with their descendants, who were among many that homesteaded the surrounding agricultural community.

== History ==
=== Cemetery ===
The history of Steelesville Cemetery dates back to the 1860s when the first Swedish immigrants to the area arrived and settled in the farming community south of Dassel, Minnesota. Most all of these settlers arrived with personal belongings of little value, but rich in Christianity along with their deep-seated trust in God. On February 13, 1873, a meeting was called and held at the house of Sven Harling for the purpose of discussing the advisability of organizing a new Lutheran congregation. Out of that meeting came a congregation named “The Swedish Evangelical Lutheran Congregation of Steelsville, Meeker County, Minnesota”. At the first annual meeting, held January 2, 1874, it was reported that a piece of land had been procured and a church building erected without debt, in Section 11, a place better known as the Dahlman Skog. At this location ten children and three adults members were buried. Two and a half years later the road past the church was closed. As a result, on September 20, 1876, Sven Harling, although never a member of the church, agreed to donate one acre of land in the southwest corner of his Section 3 farm and a decision was made to move the log church building. In early 1877 the church building was relocated to the site. The fee ownership of the land was then transferred on February 4, 1878. The church building was placed in the southeast corner of the one-acre lot as the road at that time, better known as the Dassel-Hutchinson Stage road, was then located on the east side of the present day Steelesville Cemetery. Shortly thereafter, in the same year, a petition was presented by ten men of the congregation, to relocate the congregation and build a new church building in Dassel, Minnesota. On September 26, 1877, a congregational decision was made: 1) that the högmässo gudstjänster, or the högmässo worship be held in Dassel, Minnesota after the beginning of 1878; 2) that services on Sunday afternoons and week days be held in Steelesville; 3) that even after the congregation is moved to Dassel, this property (Steelesville Cemetery) shall always be kept – the grounds for a cemetery and the building for school purposes. Thirty years later in 1908 the Steelesville church building was sold to John Bredeson. The building was moved to his farm and used as a barn. In 1919 extensive cemetery improvements were completed. All monuments were removed, then plowed, leveled and reseeded. The monuments were replaced, and the whole acre surveyed into lots with walks between each row. On March 31, 1970, the Steelesville Cemetery Association was incorporated as a nonprofit organization. On June 12, 1928, the congregation of The Swedish Evangelical Lutheran Congregation of Steelsville, Meeker County, Minnesota, changed its name to "First Evangelical Lutheran Church of Dassel, Minnesota". On February 16, 1981, the congregation again changed its name to "Gethsemane Evangelical Lutheran Church of Dassel, Minnesota". The cemetery continues to be owned by the same congregation since its inception.

=== Origin of name ===
The origin of the name “Steelesville” was determined thanks to descendants of the Steele family who documented their family genealogy. Hawkins Ferrell Steele, better known as Hawk Steele, was born in 1821 and lived in Logan County, West Virginia, home of the most notorious family feud between the Hatfields and the McCoys. Steele served in the Confederate Army during the American Civil War. After the war ended, Hawkins was inflicted with wanderlust and signed up for a wagon train headed for Minnesota. There were other families on the same wagon train including names such as Blair, Ramey, Rasnick, Counts and Johnson. Steele was one of the earlier settlers of western Wright County, and that section of Wright County, Minnesota later became part of the newly organized Meeker County, Minnesota. He organized a town called “New Virginia” in the spring of 1866. Steele was the Town Clerk. In 1870 the town name was changed to Collinwood. Steele resided in Section 18 of Collinwood Township where he operated a blacksmith shop. Steelesville was the name assigned to School District Number 22, the school house being located just 1/2 of a mile south of Steelesville Cemetery. The community of Steelesville was later defined by the boundaries of the Steelesville School District.

== Current events ==
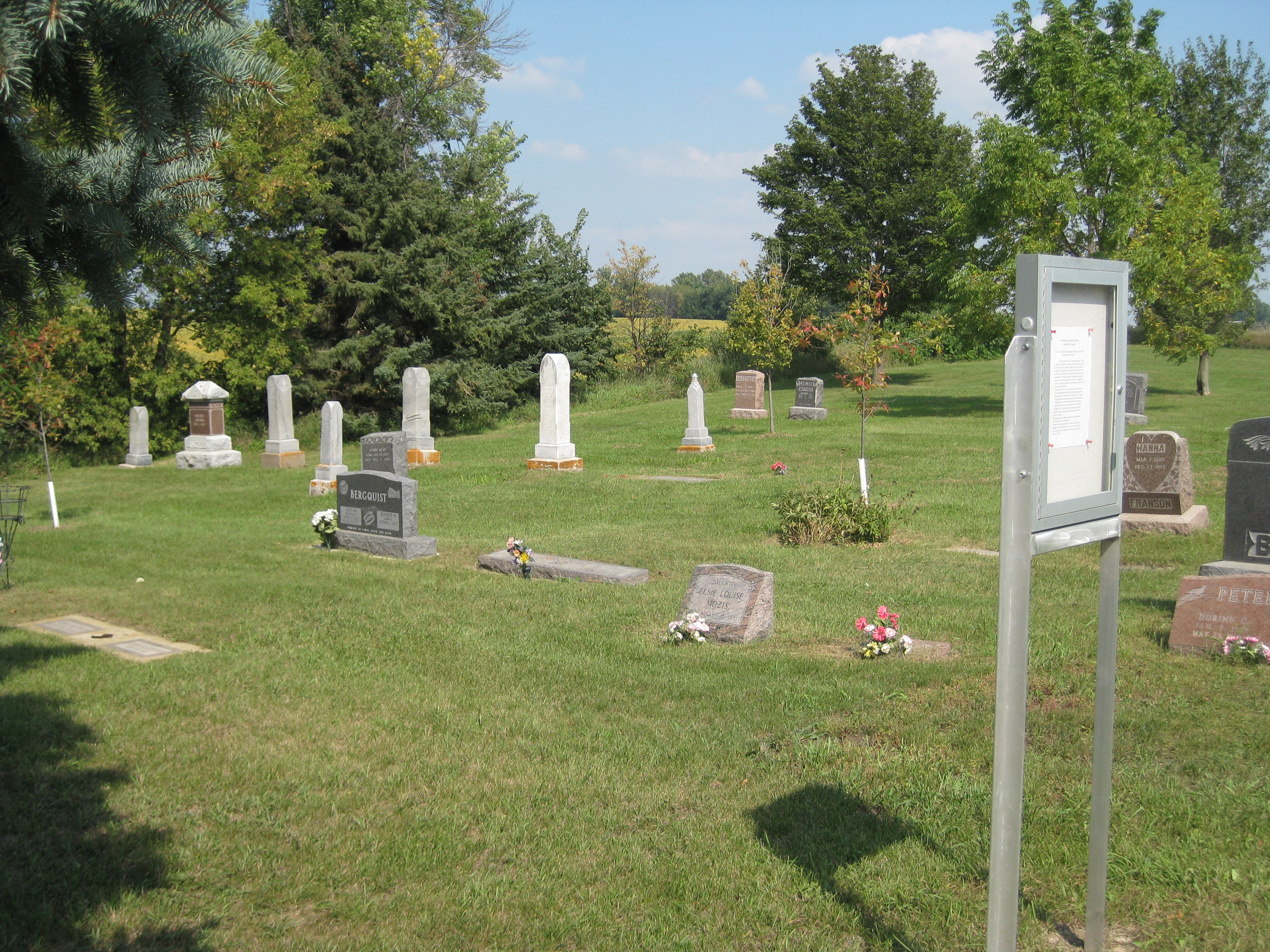
Steelesville Cemetery in 2009

=== Improvements ===
In recent years many improvements have been made to Steelesville Cemetery. In 2010 a new sign was constructed and installed in the Southwest corner of the property. The sign rests on the highest elevation and is clearly visible on the adjacent road. As with many cemeteries, monuments are in need of periodic reconditioning. Many of the monuments have settled into the soil, and are no longer level. With the help of heavy equipment, many of the large monuments have been removed from their respective location, new precast concrete bases have been installed, and the monument replaced to their respective locations. Many of the flat monuments have settled and become overgrown with sod. These monuments have been reclaimed and re-leveled in their respective locations. A significant amount of the restoration has been completed with the help of monetary donations and volunteer labor.

=== Suicide burial ===
In 2011 the Steelesville Cemetery Association embarked on a project that brought media coverage to the cemetery. On August 31, 1911, a church and community member, Johan August Lunnberg, reportedly ended his life after suffering from effects of addiction and other psychological illnesses. Cemetery records indicated that he was buried outside of the boundary lines, in the far northeast corner of the cemetery. Stories, passed down from generation to generation, indicated that Lunnberg's father transported the remains of his son to the cemetery, and buried his son without the proper traditional rites, as this was the custom of the day for a victim of suicide. After considerable discussion, the cemetery association decided to apply for a grant to acquire and erect a cemetery monument in memory of Lunnberg. On August 30, 2011, 100 years later, the monument was set in place at the burial site. Then on September 18, 2011, a memorial service was held at the Lunnberg's grave site, dedicating this monument to “Johan August Lunnberg and all who lie in Unmarked Graves”. The Dassel-Cokato Enterprise-Dispatch featured a front-page article on this project.

KARE-11 News also featured the Lunnberg story on its September 27, 2011 edition of “Land of 10,000 Stories: Rewriting the Story of a 100-year-old Suicide”. As a result of its excellent journalistic accomplishment in producing this story, KARE-11 became a 2012 recipient of a prestigious Gabriel Award. The Gabriel Awards are designed to honor works of excellence in film, network and cable television and radio programs. These include, feature films and documentaries, entertainment and news programming, public service announcements, and stations which serve audiences through the positive, creative treatment of concerns to humankind.
