= Jennie, Minnesota =

- Unincorporated community
- Location within Minnesota Location within the United States
- Coordinates: 45°00′28″N 94°20′53″W
- Country: United States
- State: Minnesota
- County: Meeker
- Township: Collinwood
- Elevation: 1,102 ft (336 m)
- Time zone: UTC-6 (Central (CST))
  - Summer (DST): UTC-5 (CDT)
- ZIP code: 55325
- Area code: 320
- GNIS feature ID: 654769

Jennie is an unincorporated community in Collinwood Township, Meeker County, Minnesota, United States. The community is located near Dassel along 180th Street near 705th Avenue.
