= Lamson, Minnesota =

- Unincorporated community
- Location within Minnesota Location within the United States
- Coordinates: 44°59′25″N 94°16′29″W
- Country: United States
- State: Minnesota
- County: Meeker
- Township: Collinwood
- Elevation: 1,083 ft (330 m)
- Time zone: UTC-6 (Central (CST))
  - Summer (DST): UTC-5 (CDT)
- ZIP code: 55325
- Area code: 320
- GNIS feature ID: 654783

Lamson is an unincorporated community in Collinwood Township, Meeker County, Minnesota, United States, near Dassel. The community is located along Meeker County Road 5 near 740th Avenue.
