= Greenleaf, Minnesota =

- Unincorporated community
- Location within Minnesota Location within the United States
- Coordinates: 44°59′47″N 94°29′58″W
- Country: United States
- State: Minnesota
- County: Meeker
- Townships: Ellsworth and Greenleaf
- Elevation: 1,112 ft (339 m)
- Time zone: UTC-6 (Central (CST))
  - Summer (DST): UTC-5 (CDT)
- ZIP code: 55355
- Area code: 320
- GNIS feature ID: 644445

Greenleaf is an unincorporated community in Meeker County, Minnesota, United States, near Litchfield and Cedar Mills. The community is located along Meeker County Road 18 near State Highway 22 (MN 22).

Greenleaf is located within Ellsworth Township and Greenleaf Township.

Historical population
Census	Pop.	Note	%±
1870	54		—
1880	63		16.7%
U.S. Decennial Census

== History ==
Greenleaf was platted in 1859 by William Henry Greenleaf, who became a State Senator, and named for him. A post office was established at Greenleaf in 1860, and remained in operation until it was discontinued in 1906.
