= Rosendale, Minnesota =

- Unincorporated community
- Location within Minnesota Location within the United States
- Coordinates: 45°02′26″N 94°42′24″W
- Country: United States
- State: Minnesota
- County: Meeker
- Township: Danielson
- Elevation: 1,181 ft (360 m)
- Time zone: UTC-6 (Central (CST))
  - Summer (DST): UTC-5 (CDT)
- ZIP code: 56243
- Area code: 320
- GNIS feature ID: 650294

Rosendale is an unincorporated community in Danielson Township, Meeker County, Minnesota, United States.

The community is located along Meeker County Road 28 near its junction with State Highway 4 (MN 4).

Nearby places include Grove City, Cosmos, Atwater, and Litchfield. Rosendale is 14 miles southwest of Litchfield.
