= Corvuso, Minnesota =

- Unincorporated community
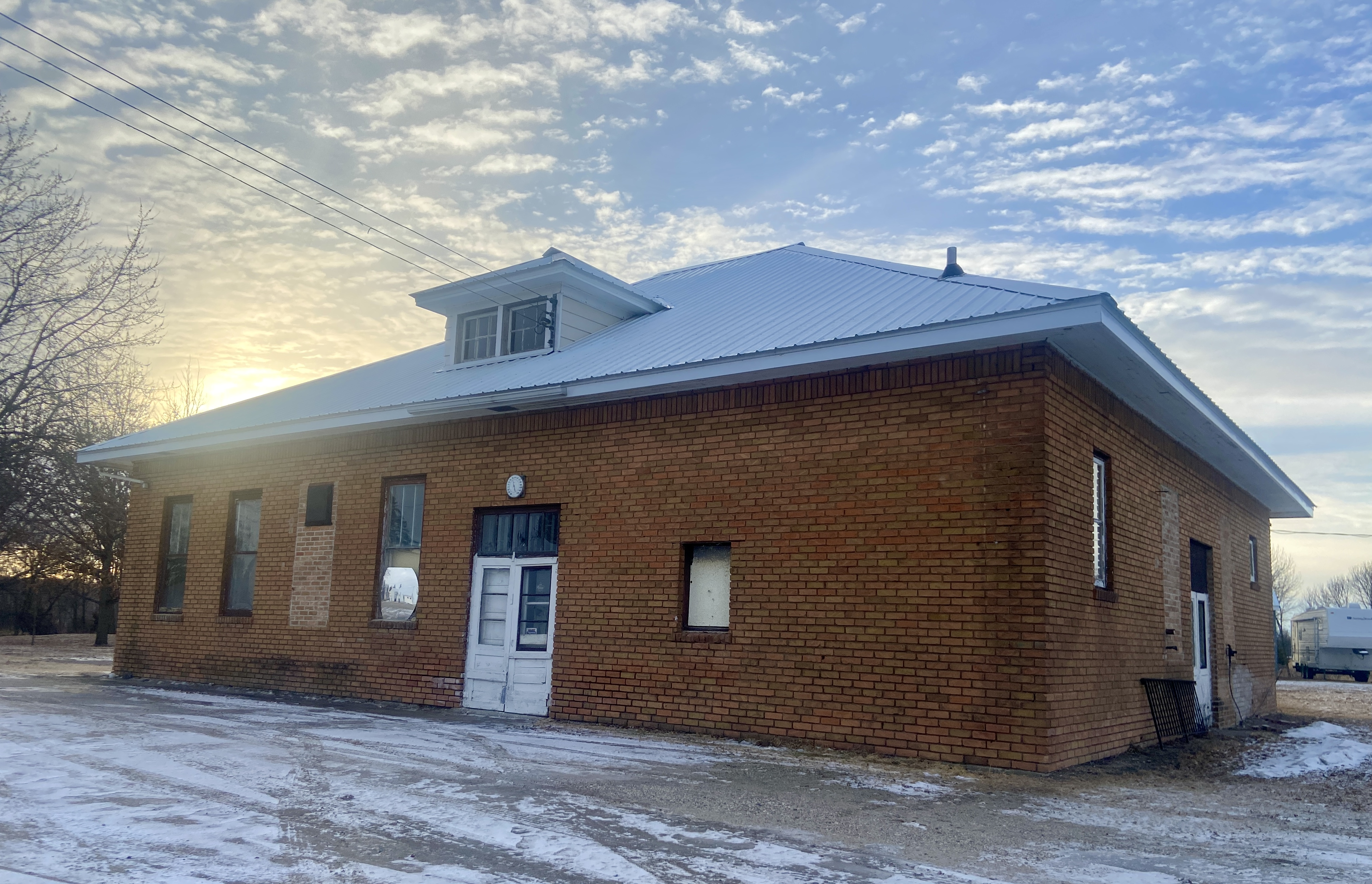
- Former creamery building in Corvuso

- Location within Minnesota Location within the United States
- Coordinates: 44°56′10″N 94°36′17″W
- Country: United States
- State: Minnesota
- County: Meeker
- Township: Cedar Mills
- Elevation: 1,099 ft (335 m)
- Time zone: UTC-6 (Central (CST))
  - Summer (DST): UTC-5 (CDT)
- ZIP code: 56228 and 55355
- Area code: 320
- GNIS feature ID: 641516

Corvuso is an unincorporated community in Cedar Mills Township, Meeker County, Minnesota. The community is located along Meeker County Road 1 near State Highway 7. The original site was one mile east and 1/2 mile north of the present location. The South Fork of the Crow River flows nearby.

Nearby places include Cosmos, Litchfield, and Hutchinson.
