= Beckville (disambiguation) =

Beckville may refer to:

- Beckville, Indiana, an unincorporated community
- Beckville, Minnesota, an unincorporated community
- Beckville, Piedmont, Missouri, a neighborhood
- Beckville, Texas, a city
