= Strout, Minnesota =

- Unincorporated community
- Location within Minnesota Location within the United States
- Coordinates: 45°01′48″N 94°35′40″W
- Country: United States
- State: Minnesota
- County: Meeker
- Township: Greenleaf
- Elevation: 1,178 ft (359 m)

Population (11/12/2020)
  - Total: 25
- Time zone: UTC-6 (Central (CST))
  - Summer (DST): UTC-5 (CDT)
- ZIP code: 55355
- Area code: 320
- GNIS feature ID: 654964

Strout is an unincorporated community in Greenleaf Township, Meeker County, Minnesota, United States, near Litchfield. The community is located near the junction of Meeker County Roads 1 and 28. Strout is currently home to seven different families with a total population of 25 people.

Strout was home to the locally known duo Max and Quackers. Max is a Siberian Husky that currently lives with a family residing in the community. Max was adopted at the age of 5. He quickly made friends with the family's other husky Sasha. Max became depressed when Sasha died. Shortly after, the family adopted Quackers the duck as a chick who had also lost his family. To pass the time, Max often sat next to Quackers' pen where they bonded. The two could be seen walking along Meeker County Road 28. Max and Quackers were featured on various local news stations including CBS Minnesota in 2017.

The Strout General Store was opened by Jake Hess and his wife Hilda (Anderson) Hess. Jake worked as a carpenter out of the general merchandise store during this time. Jake died in 1970, followed by Hilda's death in 1973. The original building is currently resided in by a local Strout family and no longer operates as a general store.
