= Lake Ripley (Minnesota) =

Lake in the state of Minnesota, United States

- Location within Minnesota
- Location: Meeker County, Minnesota
- Coordinates: 45°6′25″N 94°32′25″W
- Type: lake

Lake Ripley is a lake in Meeker County, in the U.S. state of Minnesota.

Lake Ripley was named for Frederick N. Ripley, who died there of exposure during the winter of 1855. It is 558 acres in size and 18 feet deep, at its deepest part.

== See also ==
- List of lakes in Minnesota
