= Swede Grove Township, Meeker County, Minnesota =

Swede Grove Township, Minnesota
- Township
- Location within the state of Minnesota Swede Grove Township, Minnesota (the United States)
- Coordinates: 45°12′N 94°42′W
- Country: United States
- State: Minnesota
- County: Meeker

Area
  - Total: 35.6 sq mi (92.1 km^{2})
  - Land: 34.7 sq mi (89.9 km^{2})
  - Water: 0.89 sq mi (2.3 km^{2})
- Elevation: 1,171 ft (357 m)

Population (2000)
  - Total: 414
  - Density: 12/sq mi (4.6/km^{2})
- Time zone: UTC-6 (Central (CST))
  - Summer (DST): UTC-5 (CDT)
- FIPS code: 27-63832
- GNIS feature ID: 0665752

Swede Grove Township is a township in Meeker County, Minnesota, United States. The population was 414 at the 2000 census.

== History ==
Swede Grove Township was first settled in 1857 by N. E. Hanson, Nels Elofson, Hans Peterson, Peter E. Lund, Nels Weylander, Andrew Peterson, and John Rosencranz. There were a few others with their families. The township was named by N. E. Hanson and Nels Elofson because it was settled by Swedes and there was a nice grove of trees nearby. Nels, by the way, was the second white man in Meeker County. The township, originally a part of Acton Township, was organized on March 15, 1868. Nels Elofson was appointed postmaster in 1859. Notable locations in Swede Grove Township are Cojo Dairy, Grove Creek Raceway, Trinity Lutheran Church, Fellowship Church, and the First Lutheran Cemetery. An interesting historical note is that Peterson Lake was so well surrounded by thick timber, that this 80-acre lake was missing from many government-issued plat maps because surveyors could not see the lake through the trees.

== Geography ==
According to the United States Census Bureau, the township has a total area of 35.6 square miles (92.1 km^{2}), of which 34.7 square miles (89.8 km^{2}) is land and 0.9 square mile (2.3 km^{2}) (2.47%) is water.

Swede Grove Township is located in Township 120 North of the Arkansas Base Line and Range 32 West of the 5th Principal Meridian.

== Demographics ==
As of the census of 2000, there were 414 people, 132 households, and 111 families residing in the township. The population density was 11.9 people per square mile (4.6/km^{2}). There were 139 housing units at an average density of 4.0/sq mi (1.5/km^{2}). The racial makeup of the township was 95.65% White, 1.21% African American and 3.14% Asian.

There were 132 households, out of which 41.7% had children under the age of 18 living with them, 68.2% were married couples living together, 7.6% had a female householder with no husband present, and 15.9% were non-families. 12.9% of all households were made up of individuals, and 3.8% had someone living alone who was 65 years of age or older. The average household size was 3.14 and the average family size was 3.43.

In the township, the population was spread out, with 34.5% under the age of 18, 6.5% from 18 to 24, 27.5% from 25 to 44, 18.8% from 45 to 64, and 12.6% who were 65 years of age or older. The median age was 34 years. For every 100 females, there were 109.1 males. For every 100 females age 18 and over, there were 116.8 males.

The median income for a household in the township was $39,750, and the median income for a family was $39,000. Males had a median income of $28,676 versus $21,875 for females. The per capita income for the township was $15,395. About 13.9% of families and 18.8% of the population were below the poverty line, including 28.7% of those under age 18 and 12.7% of those age 65 or over.
