= Harvey Township, Meeker County, Minnesota =

Harvey Township, Minnesota
- Township
- Location within the state of Minnesota Harvey Township, Minnesota (the United States)
- Coordinates: 45°13′N 94°34′W
- Country: United States
- State: Minnesota
- County: Meeker

Area
  - Total: 39.0 sq mi (100.9 km^{2})
  - Land: 38.5 sq mi (99.8 km^{2})
  - Water: 0.42 sq mi (1.1 km^{2})
- Elevation: 1,109 ft (338 m)

Population (2000)
  - Total: 445
  - Density: 12/sq mi (4.5/km^{2})
- Time zone: UTC-6 (Central (CST))
  - Summer (DST): UTC-5 (CDT)
- FIPS code: 27-27440
- GNIS feature ID: 0664408

Harvey Township is a township in Meeker County, Minnesota, United States. The population was 445 at the 2000 census.

== History ==
Harvey Township was organized in 1867, and named for James M. Harvey, a pioneer settler who came to the area in 1860. James Harvey moved to Forest City, during the Sioux Uprising, and he fought the Indians at the stockade. James ended up being the Clerk of the District Court. Harvey was first settled by John and Thomas Dougherty in the summer of 1856. They broke 25 acres of land that summer. A man named McCue came about two weeks before the Doughertys, but he soon left. The township was originally a part of Forest City, but it was organized separately in 1867. There were no marriages or deaths in Harvey until May of 1870, when Dennis Dougherty and Mary Finnegan got married. Edward Dolan, an 8 year old boy, died that year. Thomas Dougherty was the first Justice of Peace. Edward O. Britt, his wife Lucinda, and his mother Charity (nee Tibbits) were among the first settlers. They came from Maine. Charity was born in Litchfield, Maine on April 3, 1773.

== Geography ==
According to the United States Census Bureau, the township has a total area of 39.0 square miles (101 km^{2}), of which 38.5 square miles (100 km^{2}) is land and 0.4 square miles (1.0 km^{2}) (1.05%) is water.

Harvey Township is located in Township 120 North of the Arkansas Base Line and Range 31 West of the 5th Principal Meridian.

== Demographics ==
As of the census of 2000, there were 445 people, 143 households, and 119 families residing in the township. The population density was 11.5 inhabitants per square mile (4.4/km^{2}). There were 149 housing units at an average density of 3.9 per square mile (1.5/km^{2}). The racial makeup of the township was 98.88% White, 1.12% from other races. Hispanic or Latino of any race were 1.12% of the population.

There were 143 households, out of which 49.0% had children under the age of 18 living with them, 78.3% were married couples living together, 2.8% had a female householder with no husband present, and 16.1% were non-families. 14.0% of all households were made up of individuals, and 2.1% had someone living alone who was 65 years of age or older. The average household size was 3.11 and the average family size was 3.44.

In the township, the population was spread out, with 32.6% under the age of 18, 8.3% from 18 to 24, 27.0% from 25 to 44, 23.4% from 45 to 64, and 8.8% who were 65 years of age or older. The median age was 35 years. For every 100 females, there were 113.9 males. For every 100 females age 18 and over, there were 117.4 males.

The median income for a household in the township was $46,750, and the median income for a family was $46,750. Males had a median income of $30,156 versus $23,750 for females. The per capita income for the township was $18,299. About 7.9% of families and 8.7% of the population were below the poverty line, including 10.2% of those under age 18 and 5.0% of those age 65 or over.
