= Bradley B. Meeker =

American jurist, lawyer, and businessman

The Honourable Bradley B. Meeker
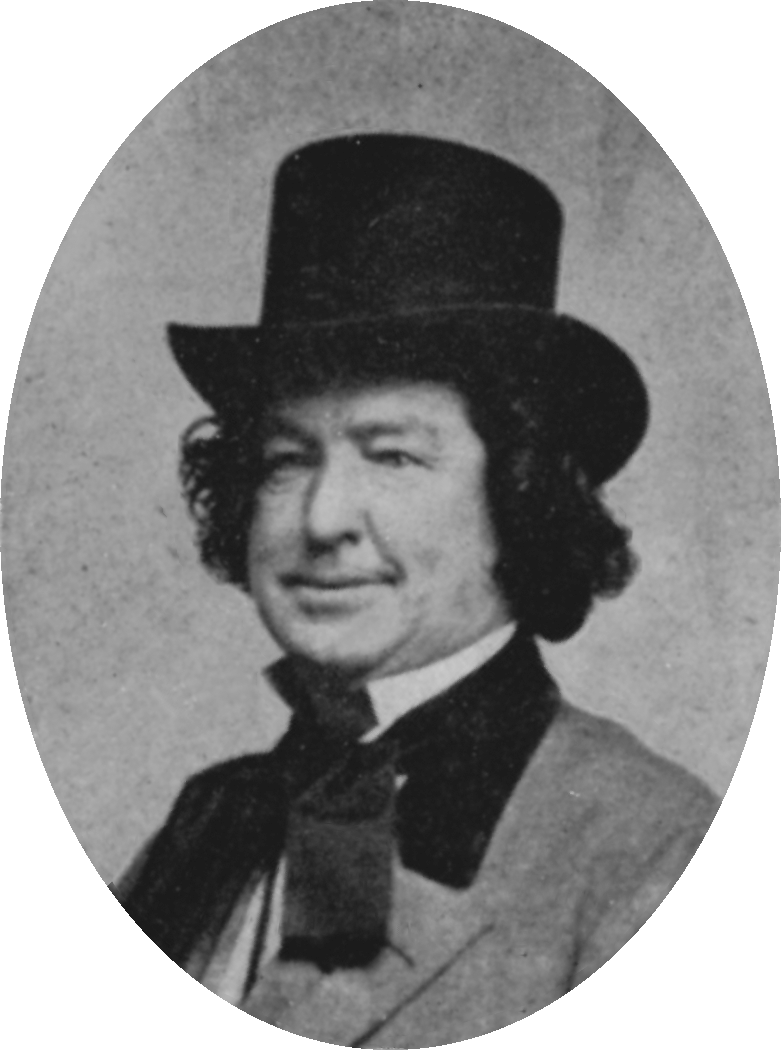

Second Associate Justice of the Minnesota Territorial Supreme Court
- In office March 19, 1849 – March 18, 1853
- Nominated by: Zachary Taylor
- Preceded by: Position created
- Succeeded by: Moses Sherburne

Personal details
- Born: March 13, 1813 Fairfield, Connecticut, US
- Died: February 19, 1873 (aged 59) Milwaukee, Wisconsin, US
- Education: Yale University (1802)

Bradley B. Meeker (March 13, 1813 – February 19, 1873) was an American jurist, lawyer, and businessman.

== Biography ==
Meeker was born on March 13, 1813, in Fairfield, Connecticut, to Joseph and Rhoda Meeker (née Nichols). His family was very poor, despite being descendants of one of their city's founders. Meeker was related to Truman Smith, a senator who inspired him to pursue law. With the help of Governor Gideon Tomlinson, Meeker went to Weston Academy and graduated from Yale University. Meeker practiced law in Richmond, Kentucky, from 1838 to 1845 and in Flemingsburg, Kentucky.

Meeker came to Minnesota Territory in 1848. After making a name for himself in the world of law, Meeker was nominated to serve on the Minnesota Territorial Supreme Court by President Zachary Taylor on March 15, 1849, with the Senate confirming him on March 19, 1849. He took the oath of office on May 9, 1849. His four-year term expired on March 18, 1853. Of the three justices on the court at the time (Chief Justice Aaron Goodrich, Justice David Cooper, and himself), he was the least controversial.

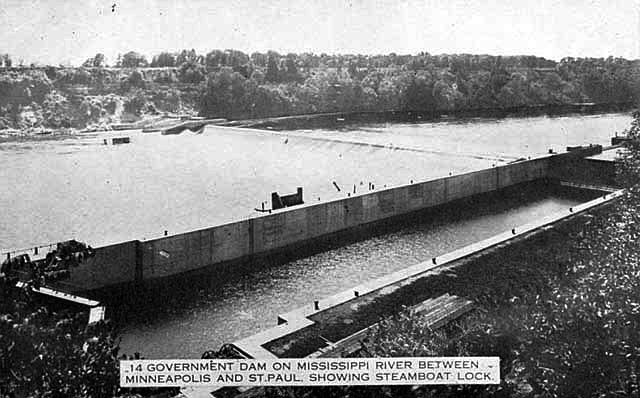
The Meeker Island Lock and Dam c. 1910

Once he left the Minnesota Territorial Supreme Court, Meeker was elected as a delegate of the Minnesota Constitutional Convention, served as one of the first regents of the University of Minnesota, and was a charter member of the Minnesota Historical Society.

He owned land on the Mississippi River, including Meeker Island, which was named after him. In 1856, he had a county named in his honour.

Meeker died suddenly in Milwaukee, Wisconsin, on February 19, 1873. He was never married.
