= Dassel Township, Meeker County, Minnesota =

Dassel Township, Minnesota
- Township
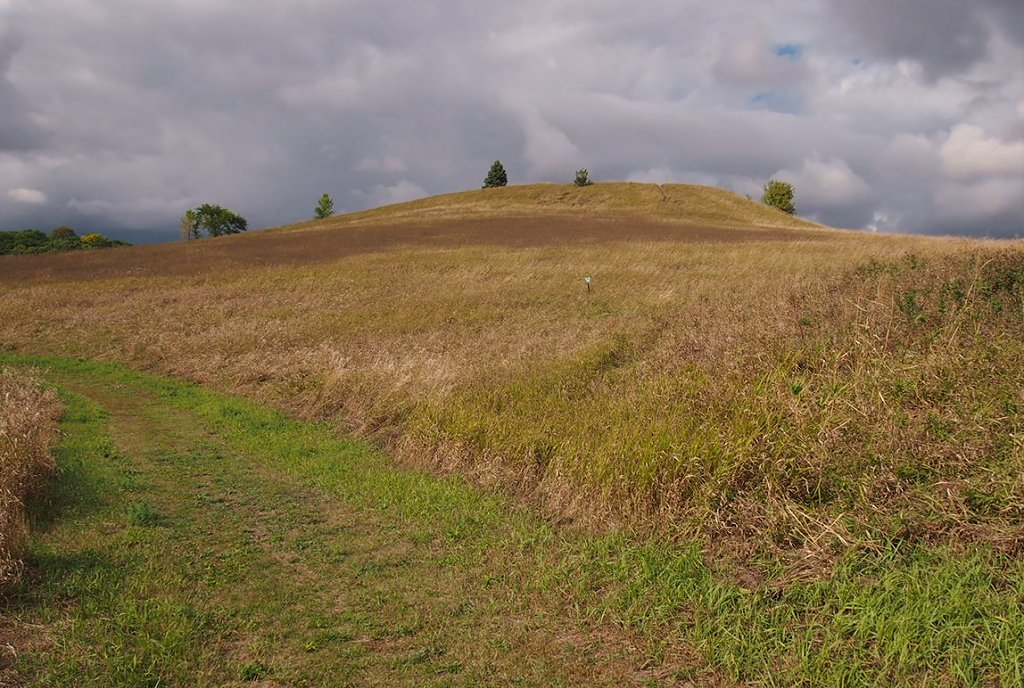
- Darwin–Dassel County Park

- Location within the state of Minnesota Dassel Township, Minnesota (the United States)
- Coordinates: 45°6′N 94°19′W
- Country: United States
- State: Minnesota
- County: Meeker

Area
  - Total: 34.3 sq mi (88.8 km^{2})
  - Land: 30.2 sq mi (78.2 km^{2})
  - Water: 4.1 sq mi (10.5 km^{2})
- Elevation: 1,076 ft (328 m)

Population (2000)
  - Total: 1,361
  - Density: 45/sq mi (17.4/km^{2})
- Time zone: UTC-6 (Central (CST))
  - Summer (DST): UTC-5 (CDT)
- ZIP code: 55325
- Area code: 320
- FIPS code: 27-14896
- GNIS feature ID: 0663931

Dassel Township is a township in Meeker County, Minnesota, United States. The population was 1,361 at the 2000 census. The township surrounds the city of Dassel.

== History ==
Dassel Township was organized in 1866, and named for Bernard Dassel, a railroad official.

== Geography ==
According to the United States Census Bureau, the township has a total area of 34.3 square miles (89 km^{2}), of which 30.2 square miles (78 km^{2}) is land and 4.1 square miles (11 km^{2}) (11.88%) is water.

Dassel Township is located in Township 119 North of the Arkansas Base Line and Range 29 West of the 5th Principal Meridian.

== Demographics ==
As of the census of 2000, there were 1,361 people, 464 households, and 382 families residing in the township. The population density was 45.1 inhabitants per square mile (17.4/km^{2}). There were 558 housing units at an average density of 18.5 per square mile (7.1/km^{2}). The racial makeup of the township was 97.87% White, 0.07% Native American, 1.32% Asian, 0.37% from other races, and 0.37% from two or more races. Hispanic or Latino of any race were 0.51% of the population. 31.7% were of German, 21.1% Swedish, 18.2% Finnish, and 7.8% Norwegian ancestry according to Census 2000.

There were 464 households, out of which 39.4% had children under the age of 18 living with them, 76.1% were married couples living together, 1.7% had a female householder with no husband present, and 17.5% were non-families. 14.4% of all households were made up of individuals, and 4.7% had someone living alone who was 65 years of age or older. The average household size was 2.93 and the average family size was 3.25.

In the township the population was spread out, with 31.7% under the age of 18, 6.0% from 18 to 24, 26.6% from 25 to 44, 25.9% from 45 to 64, and 9.8% who were 65 years of age or older. The median age was 37 years. For every 100 females, there were 105.6 males. For every 100 females age 18 and over, there were 108.1 males.

The median income for a household in the township was $54,167, and the median income for a family was $57,434. Males had a median income of $36,875 versus $30,750 for females. The per capita income for the township was $19,845. About 2.5% of families and 3.5% of the population were below the poverty line, including 1.0% of those under age 18 and 13.4% of those age 65 or over.
