= Beckville, Minnesota =

- Unincorporated community
- Location within Minnesota Location within the United States
- Coordinates: 45°02′40″N 94°33′50″W
- Country: United States
- State: Minnesota
- County: Meeker
- Township: Greenleaf
- Elevation: 1,191 ft (363 m)
- Time zone: UTC-6 (Central (CST))
  - Summer (DST): UTC-5 (CDT)
- ZIP code: 55355
- Area code: 320
- GNIS feature ID: 639857

Beckville is an unincorporated community in Greenleaf Township, Meeker County, Minnesota, United States, located near Litchfield. The community is located along 600th Avenue near 205th Street.
