= Cosmos Township, Meeker County, Minnesota =

Cosmos Township, Minnesota
- Township
- Location within the state of Minnesota Cosmos Township, Minnesota (the United States)
- Coordinates: 44°55′37″N 94°41′9″W
- Country: United States
- State: Minnesota
- County: Meeker

Area
  - Total: 35.1 sq mi (90.9 km^{2})
  - Land: 34.7 sq mi (90.0 km^{2})
  - Water: 0.35 sq mi (0.9 km^{2})
- Elevation: 1,106 ft (337 m)

Population (2000)
  - Total: 229
  - Density: 6.5/sq mi (2.5/km^{2})
- Time zone: UTC-6 (Central (CST))
  - Summer (DST): UTC-5 (CDT)
- ZIP code: 56228
- Area code: 320
- FIPS code: 27-13438
- GNIS feature ID: 0663878

Cosmos Township is a township in Meeker County, Minnesota, United States. The population was 229 at the 2000 census.

Cosmos Township was organized in 1870, and named for the cosmos, or the order of the universe.

== Geography ==
According to the United States Census Bureau, the township has a total area of 35.1 square miles (91 km^{2}), of which 34.8 square miles (90 km^{2}) is land and 0.3 square miles (0.78 km^{2}) (0.97%) is water.

== Demographics ==
As of the census of 2000, there were 229 people, 93 households, and 69 families residing in the township. The population density was 6.6 inhabitants per square mile (2.5/km^{2}). There were 98 housing units at an average density of 2.8 per square mile (1.1/km^{2}). The racial makeup of the township was 99.56% White, and 0.44% from two or more races.

There were 93 households, out of which 34.4% had children under the age of 18 living with them, 60.2% were married couples living together, 5.4% had a female householder with no husband present, and 25.8% were non-families. 22.6% of all households were made up of individuals, and 8.6% had someone living alone who was 65 years of age or older. The average household size was 2.46 and the average family size was 2.84.

In the township the population was spread out, with 26.2% under the age of 18, 5.7% from 18 to 24, 29.7% from 25 to 44, 21.8% from 45 to 64, and 16.6% who were 65 years of age or older. The median age was 38 years. For every 100 females, there were 116.0 males. For every 100 females age 18 and over, there were 111.3 males.

The median income for a household in the township was $40,000, and the median income for a family was $41,042. Males had a median income of $29,375 versus $21,250 for females. The per capita income for the township was $17,438. About 9.9% of families and 8.3% of the population were below the poverty line, including 10.9% of those under the age of eighteen and 12.5% of those 65 or over.
