= Forest Prairie Township, Meeker County, Minnesota =

Forest Prairie Township, Minnesota
- Township
- Location within the state of Minnesota Forest Prairie Township, Minnesota (the United States)
- Coordinates: 45°17′N 94°27′W
- Country: United States
- State: Minnesota
- County: Meeker

Area
  - Total: 35.4 sq mi (91.7 km^{2})
  - Land: 34.3 sq mi (88.8 km^{2})
  - Water: 1.1 sq mi (2.9 km^{2})
- Elevation: 1,138 ft (347 m)

Population (2000)
  - Total: 869
  - Density: 25/sq mi (9.8/km^{2})
- Time zone: UTC-6 (Central (CST))
  - Summer (DST): UTC-5 (CDT)
- FIPS code: 27-21842
- GNIS feature ID: 0664196

Forest Prairie Township is a township in Meeker County, Minnesota, United States. The population was 869 at the 2000 census.

== History ==
Forest Prairie Township was given that name for the forests and prairies within its borders. It is just north of Forest City, south of Watkins, and by Clear Lake. It was first settled in the spring of 1866 by Merritt Birdsall Case, Charles T. Groot, James Hooser, J. S. Reynolds, George Scrivner, George Smith, James W. Polk, Seymour Stevens, and Michael A. Roach. The first white births in the township were twins born to Mr. and Mrs. George Smith in 1866. The first white death was Mrs. George Smith in 1866. Birthing complications? The township was organized on July 10, 1867. The first postmaster was H. M. Storrs in 1867. The first school was taught by Mrs. James Hooser in 1868. The Minneapolis Pacific Railway Co. purchased land in 1886 and laid their own line of track, temporarily giving Forest Prairie a reputation as a railroading village rather than one as a prospering farm community. The town of Watkins was also started because of the railroad. Today it is the only town in the township.

== Geography ==
According to the United States Census Bureau, the township has a total area of 35.4 square miles (92 km^{2}), of which 34.3 square miles (89 km^{2}) is land and 1.1 square miles (2.8 km^{2}) (3.14%) is water.

Forest Prairie Township is located in Township 121 North of the Arkansas Base Line and Range 30 West of the 5th Principal Meridian.

== Demographics ==
As of the census of 2000, there were 869 people, 300 households, and 249 families residing in the township. The population density was 25.3 inhabitants per square mile (9.8/km^{2}). There were 361 housing units at an average density of 10.5 per square mile (4.1/km^{2}). The racial makeup of the township was 99.42% White, 0.12% African American, and 0.46% from two or more races.

There were 300 households, out of which 39.0% had children under the age of 18 living with them, 77.0% were married couples living together, 3.0% had a female householder with no husband present, and 17.0% were non-families. 13.3% of all households were made up of individuals, and 5.0% had someone living alone who was 65 years of age or older. The average household size was 2.90 and the average family size was 3.19.

In the township, the population was spread out, with 28.9% under the age of 18, 6.1% from 18 to 24, 27.3% from 25 to 44, 28.5% from 45 to 64, and 9.2% who were 65 years of age or older. The median age was 37 years. For every 100 females, there were 109.4 males. For every 100 females age 18 and over, there were 113.8 males.

The median income for a household in the township was $46,375, and the median income for a family was $49,444. Males had a median income of $32,788 versus $22,083 for females. The per capita income for the township was $17,340. About 5.2% of families and 7.6% of the population were below the poverty line, including 10.6% of those under age 18 and 4.1% of those age 65 or over.
