= Danielson Township, Meeker County, Minnesota =

Danielson Township, Minnesota
- Township
- Location within the state of Minnesota Danielson Township, Minnesota (the United States)
- Coordinates: 45°2′N 94°41′W
- Country: United States
- State: Minnesota
- County: Meeker

Area
  - Total: 35.9 sq mi (93.0 km^{2})
  - Land: 34.5 sq mi (89.3 km^{2})
  - Water: 1.4 sq mi (3.6 km^{2})
- Elevation: 1,152 ft (351 m)

Population (2000)
  - Total: 327
  - Density: 9.6/sq mi (3.7/km^{2})
- Time zone: UTC-6 (Central (CST))
  - Summer (DST): UTC-5 (CDT)
- FIPS code: 27-14698
- GNIS feature ID: 0663921

Danielson Township is a township in Meeker County, Minnesota, United States. The population was 327 at the 2000 census.

== Geography ==
According to the United States Census Bureau, the township has a total area of 35.9 square miles (93 km^{2}), of which 34.5 square miles (89 km^{2}) is land and 1.4 square miles (3.6 km^{2}) (3.93%) is water.

Danielson Township is located in Township 118 North of the Arkansas Base Line and Range 32 West of the 5th Principal Meridian.

== Demographics ==
As of the census of 2000, there were 327 people, 111 households, and 94 families residing in the township. The population density was 9.5 inhabitants per square mile (3.7/km^{2}). There were 117 housing units at an average density of 3.4 per square mile (1.3/km^{2}). The racial makeup of the township was 98.17% White, 1.22% Asian, and 0.61% from two or more races. Hispanic or Latino of any race were 0.31% of the population.

There were 111 households, out of which 43.2% had children under the age of 18 living with them, 76.6% were married couples living together, 1.8% had a female householder with no husband present, and 15.3% were non-families. 13.5% of all households were made up of individuals, and 4.5% had someone living alone who was 65 years of age or older. The average household size was 2.95 and the average family size was 3.24.

In the township the population was spread out, with 30.9% under the age of 18, 8.3% from 18 to 24, 24.5% from 25 to 44, 24.5% from 45 to 64, and 11.9% who were 65 years of age or older. The median age was 38 years. For every 100 females, there were 107.0 males. For every 100 females age 18 and over, there were 103.6 males.

The median income for a household in the township was $42,500, and the median income for a family was $46,250. Males had a median income of $34,375 versus $26,250 for females. The per capita income for the township was $17,234. About 4.9% of families and 4.7% of the population were below the poverty line, including 3.7% of those under age 18 and 9.3% of those age 65 or over.
