= Ellsworth Township, Meeker County, Minnesota =

Township in Meeker County, Minnesota, United States

Ellsworth Township, Minnesota
- Township
- Location within the state of Minnesota Ellsworth Township, Minnesota (the United States)
- Coordinates: 45°1′N 94°26′W
- Country: United States
- State: Minnesota
- County: Meeker

Area
  - Total: 36.3 sq mi (94.0 km^{2})
  - Land: 29.5 sq mi (76.3 km^{2})
  - Water: 6.9 sq mi (17.8 km^{2})
- Elevation: 1,080 ft (330 m)

Population (2000)
  - Total: 854
  - Density: 29/sq mi (11.2/km^{2})
- Time zone: UTC-6 (Central (CST))
  - Summer (DST): UTC-5 (CDT)
- FIPS code: 27-18818
- GNIS feature ID: 0664077

Ellsworth Township is a township in Meeker County, Minnesota, United States. The population was 854 at the 2000 census.

== History ==
Ellsworth Township was organized in 1868, and named for Colonel Elmer E. Ellsworth, friend of Abraham Lincoln, often called the "first conspicuous casualty" of the Civil War.

== Geography ==
According to the United States Census Bureau, the township has a total area of 36.3 square miles (94 km^{2}), of which 29.5 square miles (76 km^{2}) is land and 6.9 square miles (18 km^{2}) (18.89%) is water.

Ellsworth Township is located in Township 118 North of the Arkansas Base Line and Range 30 West of the 5th Principal Meridian.

== Demographics ==
As of the census of 2000, there were 854 people, 328 households, and 267 families residing in the township. The population density was 29.0 inhabitants per square mile (11.2/km^{2}). There were 460 housing units at an average density of 15.6 per square mile (6.0/km^{2}). The racial makeup of the township was 99.30% White, 0.12% African American and 0.59% Native American. Hispanic or Latino of any race were 0.23% of the population.

There were 328 households, out of which 32.6% had children under the age of 18 living with them, 75.0% were married couples living together, 3.0% had a female householder with no husband present, and 18.3% were non-families. 15.2% of all households were made up of individuals, and 6.1% had someone living alone who was 65 years of age or older. The average household size was 2.60 and the average family size was 2.87.

In the township the population was spread out, with 23.4% under the age of 18, 7.0% from 18 to 24, 25.9% from 25 to 44, 31.1% from 45 to 64, and 12.5% who were 65 years of age or older. The median age was 42 years. For every 100 females, there were 109.8 males. For every 100 females age 18 and over, there were 106.3 males.

The median income for a household in the township was $51,406, and the median income for a family was $54,750. Males had a median income of $40,924 versus $25,000 for females. The per capita income for the township was $22,039. About 2.8% of families and 3.8% of the population were below the poverty line, including 4.3% of those under age 18 and 11.5% of those age 65 or over.
