= Kingston Township, Meeker County, Minnesota =

Kingston Township, Minnesota
- Township
- Location within the state of Minnesota Kingston Township, Minnesota (the United States)
- Coordinates: 45°13′N 94°19′W
- Country: United States
- State: Minnesota
- County: Meeker

Area
  - Total: 53.6 sq mi (138.9 km^{2})
  - Land: 51.8 sq mi (134.2 km^{2})
  - Water: 1.8 sq mi (4.7 km^{2})
- Elevation: 1,070 ft (326 m)

Population (2000)
  - Total: 1,266
  - Density: 24/sq mi (9.4/km^{2})
- Time zone: UTC-6 (Central (CST))
  - Summer (DST): UTC-5 (CDT)
- ZIP code: 55325
- Area code: 320
- FIPS code: 27-33362
- GNIS feature ID: 0664639

Kingston Township is a township in Meeker County, Minnesota, United States. It includes the City of Kingston. The population was 1,266 at the 2000 census.

Kingston Township was organized in 1858, and named after Kingston.

== Geography ==
According to the United States Census Bureau, the township has a total area of 53.6 square miles (139 km^{2}), of which 51.8 square miles (134 km^{2}) is land and 1.8 square miles (4.7 km^{2}) (3.36%) is water.

Kingston Township is located in Townships 120 and 121 North of the Arkansas Base Line and Range 29 West of the 5th Principal Meridian.

== Demographics ==
As of the census of 2000, there were 1,266 people, 409 households, and 332 families residing in the township. The population density was 24.4 inhabitants per square mile (9.4/km^{2}). There were 531 housing units at an average density of 10.2 per square mile (3.9/km^{2}). The racial makeup of the township was 98.58% White, 0.32% African American, 0.24% Native American, 0.16% Asian, 0.08% from other races, and 0.63% from two or more races. Hispanic or Latino of any race were 0.63% of the population. 33.6% were of German, 18.7% Finnish, 11.7% Swedish, 7.8% Norwegian, and 6.3% Irish ancestry according to Census 2000.

There were 409 households, out of which 38.6% had children under the age of 18 living with them, 74.1% were married couples living together, 3.4% had a female householder with no husband present, and 18.8% were non-families. 13.4% of all households were made up of individuals, and 7.8% had someone living alone who was 65 years of age or older. The average household size was 3.10 and the average family size was 3.44.

In the township the population was spread out, with 33.3% under the age of 18, 7.3% from 18 to 24, 27.3% from 25 to 44, 20.8% from 45 to 64, and 11.5% who were 65 years of age or older. The median age was 35 years. For every 100 females, there were 108.9 males. For every 100 females age 18 and over, there were 108.1 males.

The median income for a household in the township was $41,012, and the median income for a family was $41,369. Males had a median income of $30,909 versus $22,411 for females. The per capita income for the township was $15,662. About 4.7% of families and 7.6% of the population were below the poverty line, including 7.8% of those under age 18 and 19.0% of those age 65 or over.
