= Dassel History Center & Ergot Museum =

Museum in Dassel, Minnesota

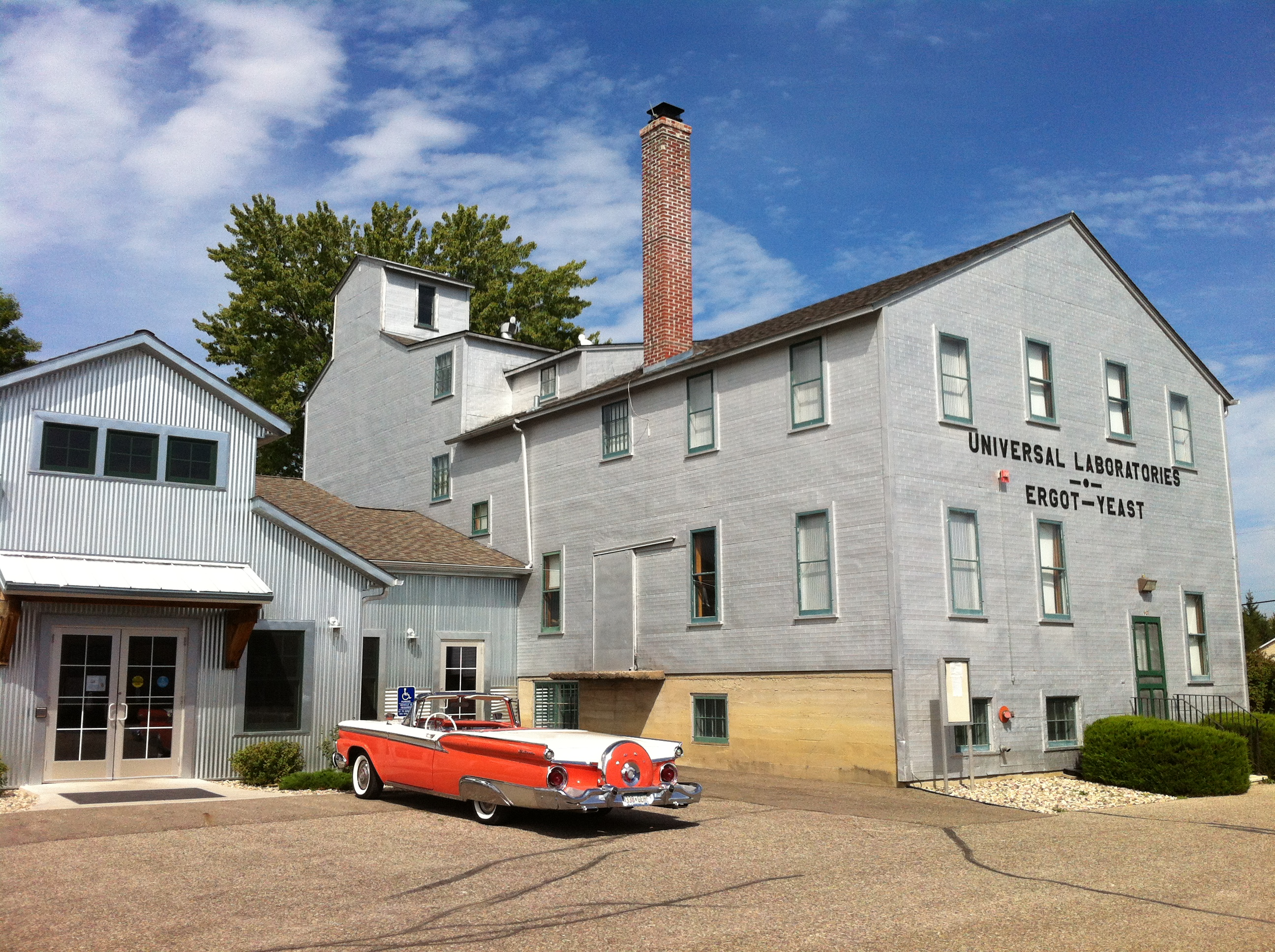
- Building exterior
- Established: 2006
- Location: 901 1st St, Dassel, Minnesota 55325
- Type: Local history
- Executive director: Carolyn Holje
- Website: dasselhistorycenter.com

The Dassel History Center & Ergot Museum, is a museum in Dassel, Minnesota, United States. The museum was established in 2006 in the historic Universal Laboratories building which is listed on the National Register for its role in the production of ergot from the mid-1930s through the late 1960s.

== Dassel History Center & Ergot Museum ==
The Dassel History Center & Ergot Museum is operated by the Dassel Area Historical Society. The museum opened in 2006 in the historic Universal Laboratories building. The museum features permanent about the history of Dassel, Minnesota, and the story of ergot, a fungus that has affected people through history. The exhibit Ergot: From Blight to Blessing explains the history of ergot, showing how it harmed rye crops and how it became a source for medicine. The exhibit Dassel Seed Corn Story: Planting the Seed describes Dassel’s role in the seed corn industry and the region’s farming traditions. The exhibit Magnus Johnson: No Yokel and No Man’s Echo tells about Magnus Johnson, a member of the Minnesota Farmer–Labor Party and the only Swedish-born person to serve in the U.S. Senate. The museum also presents changing exhibits about Dassel’s history and culture that may focus on local businesses, leaders, or key events. It holds events during the year, including lectures, workshops, and programs on local history and culture.

=== Research collection ===
The Dassel History Center & Ergot Museum keeps a research collection about the history of Dassel, Kingston, Darwin, and nearby townships. It includes an index of Dassel newspapers starting in 1893, with microfilm and original copies. The collection also has census records, plat maps, obituaries, photographs, local histories, church and school records, family histories, and a community index.

- Universal Laboratories Building
- U.S. National Register of Historic Places
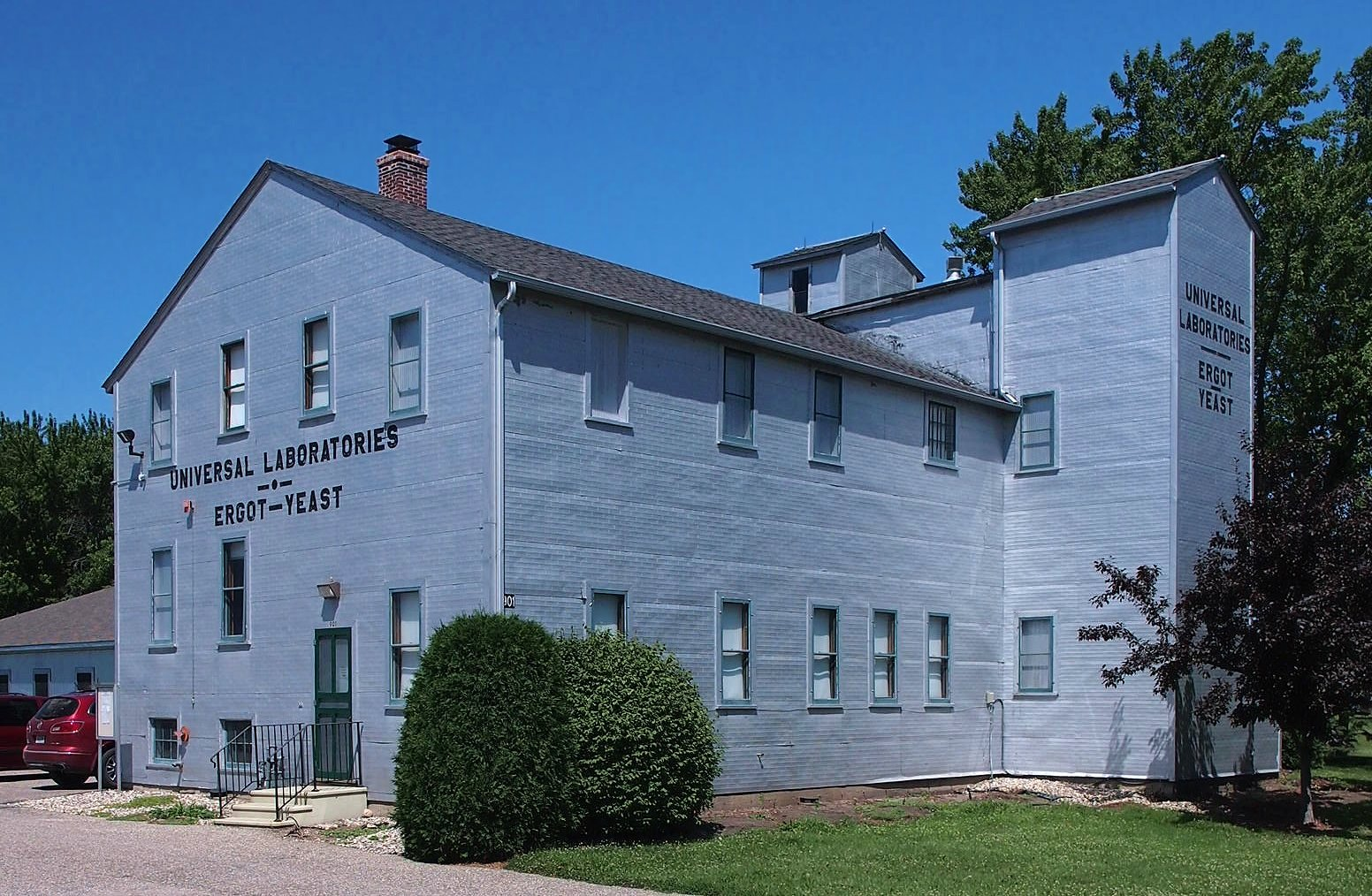
- The Universal Laboratories Building from the southeast

- Location within Minnesota Location within the United States
- Location: 901 First St. N., Dassel, Minnesota
- Coordinates: 45°5′11″N 94°18′27″W
- Built: 1937
- Architect: H.E. Swanson
- NRHP reference No.: 96000191
- Added to NRHP: March 1, 1996

Universal Laboratories Building is a building in Dassel, Minnesota, United States, listed on the National Register of Historic Places. It was listed on the National Register for its role in the production of ergot from the mid-1930s through the late 1960s.

== Universal Laboratories Building History ==
The business was established in 1935 as Rice Laboratories, as a manufacturer of yeast for livestock feed. Yeast was used as a feed supplement because the enzymes fermenting in the digestive tracts of hogs and poultry would break down food and help in nutrient absorption. In 1937, the company built a new building on the north edge of town. In that same year, the manager of the company, Lester R. Peel, started production of ergot. Local farmers were discarding rye that was infected with sclerotia growths, because the ergot could cause deadly poisoning. Peel, a former school teacher, understood that the ergot also had medical applications, such as controlling postpartum bleeding and treating vasoconstriction, hypertension, vascular headaches, and migraines.

Peel gave the ergot business the name Universal Laboratories. Production initially began with ergotic rye bought from local farmers. Universal Laboratories staff would then bring the rye through small mills that would break up the rye kernels. They would then pick the grain from the conveyor belt and let the ergot fall into a receptacle for bagging. The company also hired people to work from their homes in Dassel picking and bagging ergot. Later, the process was improved by new machines that automated the process of separating the ergot from the rye. The grain was passed through mills that would flow into gravity separators, which had spiraling chutes that would separate the light ergot kernels from the heavier rye kernels.

Peel had good timing getting into the ergot business, because supplies in the United States had been subject to disruption. Russia was the world's principal exporter of ergot until the Russian Revolution in 1917. Spain then became the top producer of ergot, but supplies were then disrupted with the Spanish Civil War in 1936. In an effort to ensure his supply of raw materials, Peel began a campaign to educate farmers on the importance of ergot. Eli Lilly and Company, one of Peel's major customers, also assisted in this effort by providing publicity. Universal Laboratories began receiving considerable amounts of ergotic rye, which was stored in a grain elevator in downtown Dassel. The company supplied the vast majority of domestically produced ergot in the United States during World War II. In 1940, they produced 60,000 pounds (27,000 kg), while in 1941, production was 100,000 pounds (45,000 kg).

Eli Lilly continued to do business with Universal Laboratories, even after World War II ended and foreign supplies became more stable. Peel died in 1959, and the company ceased producing yeast somewhere around that time. In the late 1960s, Eli Lilly dropped Universal Laboratories in favor of European suppliers of ergot. The company continued business for a while longer, providing ergot to Burroughs Wellcome, but it went out of business in 1975. The building sat empty until the late 1990s, when local citizens rehabilitated the structure. It now houses the Dassel Area Historical Society and its museum.
