= Meeker County, Minnesota =

County in Minnesota, United States

- County
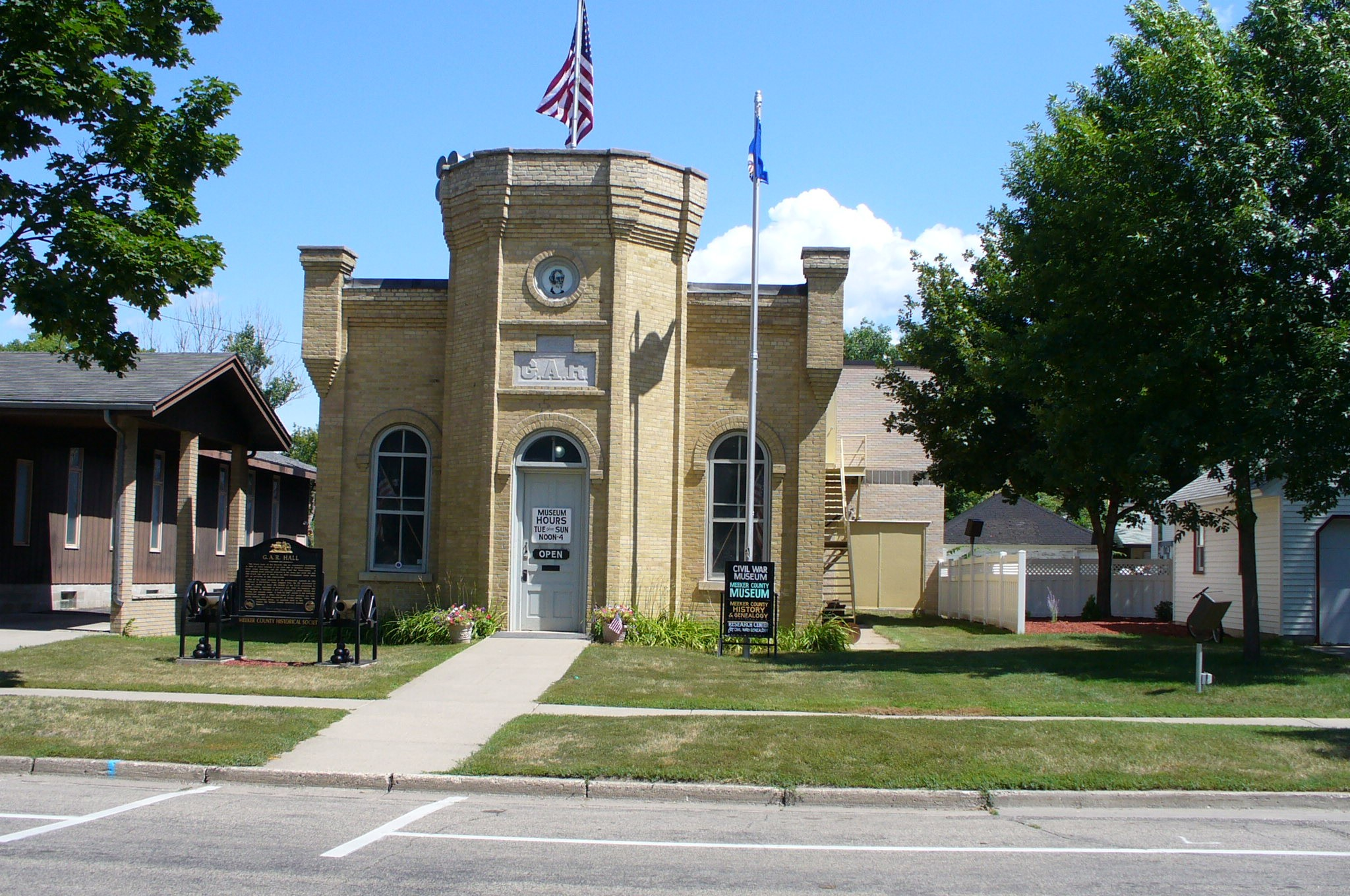
- Grand Army of the Republic Hall in Litchfield, Minnesota.

- Location within the U.S. state of Minnesota
- Coordinates: 45°07′N 94°32′W
- Country: United States
- State: Minnesota
- Founded: February 23, 1856
- Named for: Bradley B. Meeker, an associate justice of Minnesota Territorial Court
- Seat: Litchfield
- Largest city: Litchfield

Area
  - Total: 645 sq mi (1,670 km^{2})
  - Land: 608 sq mi (1,570 km^{2})
  - Water: 37 sq mi (96 km^{2}) 5.7%

Population (2020)
  - Total: 23,400
  - Estimate (2025): 23,603 ▲
  - Density: 38.5/sq mi (14.9/km^{2})
- Time zone: UTC−6 (Central)
  - Summer (DST): UTC−5 (CDT)
- Congressional district: 7th
- Website: www.co.meeker.mn.us

Meeker County is a county in the U.S. state of Minnesota. As of the 2020 census, the population was 23,400. Its county seat is Litchfield.

== History ==
Meeker County, Minnesota
- Title Page of 1st Edition
- Editors: Alden Ogle and Company
- Genre: American History, Biography
- Published: 1888
- Publisher: Donohue & Henneberry
- Publication date: 1888
- Publication place: United States of America
- Media type: Book
- Website: https://www.co.meeker.mn.us/

The Wisconsin Territory was established by the federal government effective July 3, 1836, and existed until its eastern portion was granted statehood (as Wisconsin) in 1848. The federal government set up the Minnesota Territory effective March 3, 1849. The newly organized territorial legislature created nine counties across the territory in October of that year. One of those original counties, Dakota, had portions partitioned off to create Cass (1851), Nicollet (1853), Pierce (1853), and Sibley (1853) counties. In 1855 portions of those counties were carved out to create Davis, and on February 23, 1856, the territorial legislature created Meeker County from a portion of Davis. It was named for Bradley B. Meeker (1813-1873), who served on the Minnesota Territorial Supreme Court from 1849 to 1853. The area of Forest City was first settled in the 1850s, and the village was named the county seat in 1856. It was platted as Forest City in 1857.

In 1856 the first settlers moved into the future Litchfield; the resulting settlement was named Ness. The area grew, and with the arrival of a spur from the St. Paul and Pacific Railroad, the vote was taken to move the county seat to this area in the fall of 1869. Upon being platted in 1869, the city was renamed Litchfield.

On March 20, 1858, the western portion of Meeker County was partitioned off to create Kandiyohi County. Meeker County's boundaries have remained unchanged since then.

The murder of five white homesteaders in Acton on August 17, 1862, by four young Dakota men sparked the 1862 Dakota War, and the battle of Acton on September 3 saw the 75 men of Company B, 9th Minnesota ambushed by a superior force of Dakota and forced to retreat to Hutchinson. The Dakota attacked Forest City shortly thereafter, and numerous monuments to people killed in the conflict can be found in the county.

In March 1915, a state law was passed allowing Minnesota counties to choose whether to be dry or wet counties. Meeker County voted on the issue in June, and the margin was for a dry county by 19 votes. Litchfield Brewing Company, which was at risk of closure if the law passed, ignited a legal battle against the county which lasted for six months. Both the District Court and the Minnesota Supreme Court ruled in favor of a dry county, and the county remained dry until 1953.

== Geography ==
Meeker County's terrain consists of low rolling hills, lightly wooded and heavily dotted with lakes and ponds. The available area is devoted to agriculture. The terrain slopes to the south and east, with its highest point just southwest of Lake Hope, 7.9 miles (12.7 km) west-southwest of Litchfield, at 1,261 ft (384 m) ASL. The county has a total area of 645 square miles (1,670 km^{2}), of which 608 square miles (1,570 km^{2}) is land and 37 square miles (96 km^{2}) (5.7%) is water.

Soils of Meeker County

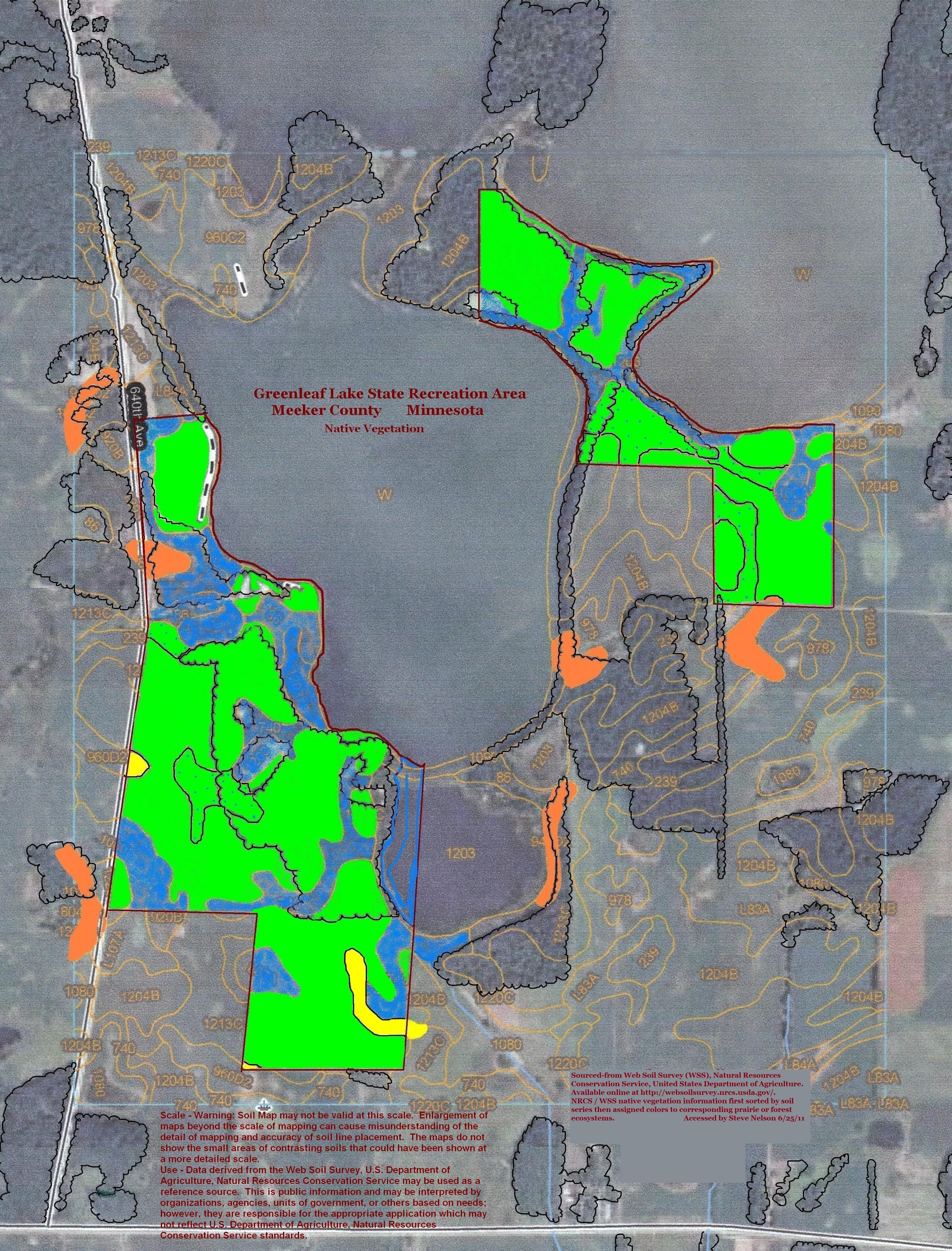
Soils of Greenleaf Lake SRA

=== Major highways ===
- U.S. Highway 12
- Minnesota State Highway 4
- Minnesota State Highway 7
- Minnesota State Highway 15
- Minnesota State Highway 22
- Minnesota State Highway 24
- Minnesota State Highway 55

=== Adjacent counties ===
- Stearns County - north
- Wright County - east
- McLeod County - southeast
- Renville County - southwest
- Kandiyohi County - west

=== Protected areas ===
- Acton State Wildlife Management Area
- Greenleaf Lake State Recreation Area
- Greenleaf State Wildlife Management Area
- Knapp State Wildlife Management Area (part)
- Madsen State Wildlife Management Area
- Popular State Wildlife Management Area
- Wieker State Wildlife Management Area

== Demographics ==
Historical population
Census	Pop.	Note	%±
1860	928		—
1870	6,090		556.3%
1880	11,739		92.8%
1890	15,456		31.7%
1900	17,753		14.9%
1910	17,022		−4.1%
1920	18,103		6.4%
1930	17,914		−1.0%
1940	19,277		7.6%
1950	18,966		−1.6%
1960	18,887		−0.4%
1970	18,387		−2.6%
1980	20,594		12.0%
1990	20,846		1.2%
2000	22,644		8.6%
2010	23,300		2.9%
2020	23,400		0.4%
2025 (est.)	23,603	▲	0.9%
U.S. Decennial Census; 1790-1960 1900-1990; 1990-2000 2010-2020

=== 2020 census ===
As of the 2020 census, the county had a population of 23,400. The median age was 42.5 years. 23.8% of residents were under the age of 18 and 20.8% of residents were 65 years of age or older. For every 100 females there were 103.6 males, and for every 100 females age 18 and over there were 102.9 males age 18 and over.

The racial makeup of the county was 93.4% White, 0.4% Black or African American, 0.2% American Indian and Alaska Native, 0.3% Asian, <0.1% Native Hawaiian and Pacific Islander, 1.7% from some other race, and 4.0% from two or more races. Hispanic or Latino residents of any race comprised 4.1% of the population.

28.1% of residents lived in urban areas, while 71.9% lived in rural areas.

There were 9,263 households in the county, of which 27.9% had children under the age of 18 living in them. Of all households, 55.7% were married-couple households, 18.3% were households with a male householder and no spouse or partner present, and 19.1% were households with a female householder and no spouse or partner present. About 26.7% of all households were made up of individuals and 12.6% had someone living alone who was 65 years of age or older.

There were 10,576 housing units, of which 12.4% were vacant. Among occupied housing units, 80.6% were owner-occupied and 19.4% were renter-occupied. The homeowner vacancy rate was 0.9% and the rental vacancy rate was 7.1%.

=== Racial and ethnic composition ===
Meeker County, Minnesota – Racial and ethnic composition Note: the US Census treats Hispanic/Latino as an ethnic category. This table excludes Latinos from the racial categories and assigns them to a separate category. Hispanics/Latinos may be of any race.
Race / Ethnicity (NH = Non-Hispanic)	Pop 1980	Pop 1990	Pop 2000	Pop 2010	Pop 2020	% 1980	% 1990	% 2000	% 2010	% 2020
White alone (NH)	20,345	20,467	21,907	22,233	21,618	98.79%	98.18%	96.75%	95.42%	92.38%
Black or African American alone (NH)	8	23	39	68	93	0.04%	0.11%	0.17%	0.29%	0.40%
Native American or Alaska Native alone (NH)	19	29	36	33	37	0.09%	0.14%	0.16%	0.14%	0.16%
Asian alone (NH)	40	91	84	59	59	0.19%	0.44%	0.37%	0.25%	0.25%
Native Hawaiian or Pacific Islander alone (NH)	x	x	1	9	2	x	x	0.00%	0.04%	0.01%
Other race alone (NH)	9	5	9	8	49	0.04%	0.02%	0.04%	0.03%	0.21%
Mixed race or Multiracial (NH)	x	x	81	123	592	x	x	0.36%	0.53%	2.53%
Hispanic or Latino (any race)	173	231	487	767	950	0.84%	1.11%	2.15%	3.29%	4.06%
Total	20,594	20,846	22,644	23,300	23,400	100.00%	100.00%	100.00%	100.00%	100.00%

=== 2000 census ===
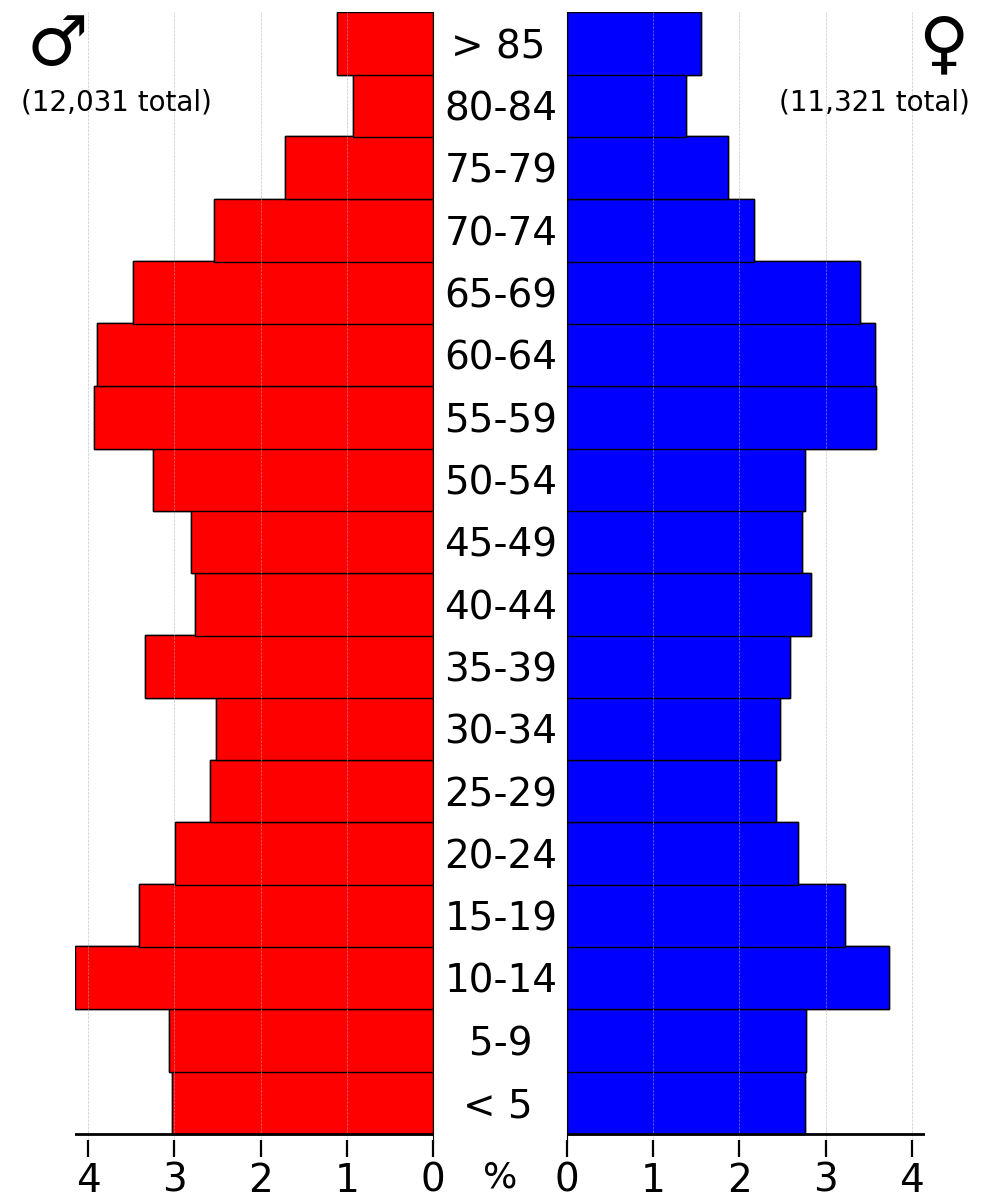
2022 US Census population pyramid for Meeker County, from ACS 5-year estimates

As of the census of 2000, there were 22,644 people, 8,590 households, and 6,133 families in the county. The population density was 37.2 per square mile (14.4/km^{2}). There were 9,821 housing units at an average density of 16.2 per square mile (6.3/km^{2}). The racial makeup of the county was 97.35% White, 0.19% Black or African American, 0.18% Native American, 0.40% Asian, 1.40% from other races, and 0.48% from two or more races. 2.15% of the population were Hispanic or Latino of any race. 45.8% were of German, 12.2% Swedish and 11.3% Norwegian ancestry.

There were 8,590 households, out of which 33.70% had children under the age of 18 living with them, 61.50% were married couples living together, 6.30% had a female householder with no husband present, and 28.60% were non-families. 24.40% of all households were made up of individuals, and 12.00% had someone living alone who was 65 years of age or older. The average household size was 2.58 and the average family size was 3.07.

The county population contained 27.00% under the age of 18, 7.40% from 18 to 24, 26.40% from 25 to 44, 23.00% from 45 to 64, and 16.30% who were 65 years of age or older. The median age was 38 years. For every 100 females there were 101.70 males. For every 100 females age 18 and over, there were 98.90 males.

The median income for a household in the county was $40,908, and the median income for a family was $47,923. Males had a median income of $33,157 versus $22,743 for females. The per capita income for the county was $18,628. About 4.70% of families and 7.10% of the population were below the poverty line, including 6.40% of those under age 18 and 13.80% of those age 65 or over.

== Communities ==
=== Cities ===
- Cedar Mills
- Cosmos
- Darwin
- Dassel
- Eden Valley (part)
- Grove City
- Kingston
- Litchfield (county seat)
- Watkins

=== Unincorporated communities ===
- Acton
- Beckville
- Corvuso
- Crow River
- Forest City
- Greenleaf
- Jennie
- Lamson
- Manannah
- Rosendale
- Strout

=== Townships ===
There were, as of 1888, 17 Townships in Meeker County.

- Acton Township
- Cedar Mills Township
- Collinwood Township
- Cosmos Township
- Danielson Township
- Darwin Township
- Dassel Township
- Ellsworth Township
- Forest City Township
- Forest Prairie Township
- Greenleaf Township
- Harvey Township
- Kingston Township
- Litchfield Township
- Manannah Township
- Swede Grove Township
- Union Grove Township

== Politics ==
Meeker County usually votes Republican. In 78% of national elections since 1980 the county selected the Republican Party candidate (as of 2020).

United States presidential election results for Meeker County, Minnesota
Year	Republican		Democratic		Third party(ies)	
Year	No.	%	No.	%	No.	%
1892	1,274	42.09%	1,146	37.86%	607	20.05%
1896	2,094	56.32%	1,538	41.37%	86	2.31%
1900	2,032	58.76%	1,300	37.59%	126	3.64%
1904	2,327	73.85%	692	21.96%	132	4.19%
1908	1,928	61.23%	1,111	35.28%	110	3.49%
1912	560	17.31%	1,099	33.97%	1,576	48.72%
1916	1,780	52.69%	1,475	43.66%	123	3.64%
1920	4,693	78.40%	878	14.67%	415	6.93%
1924	2,757	45.47%	365	6.02%	2,942	48.52%
1928	4,175	59.63%	2,761	39.43%	66	0.94%
1932	2,273	31.80%	4,723	66.08%	151	2.11%
1936	2,479	32.87%	4,242	56.25%	821	10.89%
1940	5,026	57.86%	3,615	41.62%	45	0.52%
1944	4,302	57.31%	3,159	42.09%	45	0.60%
1948	3,620	44.89%	4,333	53.73%	112	1.39%
1952	5,750	66.80%	2,833	32.91%	25	0.29%
1956	4,738	58.52%	3,348	41.35%	11	0.14%
1960	4,857	56.74%	3,678	42.97%	25	0.29%
1964	3,099	36.99%	5,270	62.90%	9	0.11%
1968	4,044	46.46%	4,213	48.40%	447	5.14%
1972	5,097	57.06%	3,601	40.31%	235	2.63%
1976	4,097	41.97%	5,295	54.25%	369	3.78%
1980	5,032	49.85%	4,238	41.98%	825	8.17%
1984	5,511	56.70%	4,156	42.76%	53	0.55%
1988	4,999	51.50%	4,544	46.81%	164	1.69%
1992	3,497	33.18%	3,861	36.63%	3,182	30.19%
1996	3,428	35.56%	4,531	47.01%	1,680	17.43%
2000	5,520	51.72%	4,402	41.25%	750	7.03%
2004	6,854	55.57%	5,292	42.91%	188	1.52%
2008	6,737	53.70%	5,380	42.89%	428	3.41%
2012	6,913	56.60%	4,969	40.68%	332	2.72%
2016	8,104	65.98%	3,191	25.98%	987	8.04%
2020	9,359	69.18%	3,867	28.58%	303	2.24%
2024	9,645	70.43%	3,802	27.76%	247	1.80%

== Notable people ==
- Magnus Johnson (1871-1936) - local farmer and United States Senator (1923-1925)

== See also ==
- National Register of Historic Places listings in Meeker County, Minnesota
