= Darwin Township, Meeker County, Minnesota =

Darwin Township, Minnesota
- Township
- Location within the state of Minnesota Darwin Township, Minnesota (the United States)
- Coordinates: 45°6′N 94°26′W
- Country: United States
- State: Minnesota
- County: Meeker

Area
  - Total: 35.4 sq mi (91.6 km^{2})
  - Land: 32.4 sq mi (83.9 km^{2})
  - Water: 2.9 sq mi (7.6 km^{2})
- Elevation: 1,119 ft (341 m)

Population (2000)
  - Total: 713
  - Density: 22/sq mi (8.5/km^{2})
- Time zone: UTC-6 (Central (CST))
  - Summer (DST): UTC-5 (CDT)
- ZIP code: 55324
- Area code: 320
- FIPS code: 27-14860
- GNIS feature ID: 0663929

Darwin Township is a township in Meeker County, Minnesota, United States. The population was 713 at the 2000 census. The township includes the city of Darwin plus a small eastern portion of the city of Litchfield.

Darwin Township was organized in 1858, and named for E. Darwin Litchfield, a railroad official.

== Geography ==
According to the United States Census Bureau, the township has a total area of 35.3 square miles (91 km^{2}), of which 32.4 square miles (84 km^{2}) is land and 3.0 square miles (7.8 km^{2}) (8.35%) is water.

Darwin Township is located in Township 119 North of the Arkansas Base Line and Range 30 West of the 5th Principal Meridian.

== Demographics ==
As of the census of 2000, there were 713 people, 281 households, and 218 families residing in the township. The population density was 22.0 inhabitants per square mile (8.5/km^{2}). There were 382 housing units at an average density of 11.8 per square mile (4.6/km^{2}). The racial makeup of the township was 97.76% White, 0.28% Native American, 0.14% Asian, 1.26% from other races, and 0.56% from two or more races. Hispanic or Latino of any race were 1.54% of the population.

There were 281 households, out of which 29.9% had children under the age of 18 living with them, 68.3% were married couples living together, 6.0% had a female householder with no husband present, and 22.1% were non-families. 17.8% of all households were made up of individuals, and 8.5% had someone living alone who was 65 years of age or older. The average household size was 2.54 and the average family size was 2.79.

In the township the population was spread out, with 21.9% under the age of 18, 6.3% from 18 to 24, 25.2% from 25 to 44, 28.1% from 45 to 64, and 18.5% who were 65 years of age or older. The median age was 43 years. For every 100 females, there were 100.3 males. For every 100 females age 18 and over, there were 105.5 males.

The median income for a household in the township was $41,818, and the median income for a family was $43,594. Males had a median income of $36,406 versus $25,000 for females. The per capita income for the township was $20,763. About 5.0% of families and 6.8% of the population were below the poverty line, including 7.6% of those under age 18 and 10.2% of those age 65 or over.
