= Cedar Mills Township, Meeker County, Minnesota =

Cedar Mills Township, Minnesota
- Township
- Location within the state of Minnesota Cedar Mills Township, Minnesota (the United States)
- Coordinates: 44°56′36″N 94°33′24″W
- Country: United States
- State: Minnesota
- County: Meeker

Area
  - Total: 39.0 sq mi (100.9 km^{2})
  - Land: 38.5 sq mi (99.7 km^{2})
  - Water: 0.46 sq mi (1.2 km^{2})
- Elevation: 1,070 ft (326 m)

Population (2000)
  - Total: 499
  - Density: 13/sq mi (5/km^{2})
- Time zone: UTC-6 (Central (CST))
  - Summer (DST): UTC-5 (CDT)
- FIPS code: 27-10486
- GNIS feature ID: 0663769

Cedar Mills Township is a township in Meeker County, Minnesota, United States. The population was 499 at the 2000 census.

Cedar Mills Township was organized in 1870, and named after Cedar Mills.

== Geography ==
According to the United States Census Bureau, the township has a total area of 39.0 square miles (101 km^{2}), of which 38.5 square miles (100 km^{2}) is land and 0.5 square miles (1.3 km^{2}) (1.21%) is water.

== Demographics ==
As of the census of 2000, there were 499 people, 177 households, and 135 families residing in the township. The population density was 13.0 inhabitants per square mile (5.0/km^{2}). There were 191 housing units at an average density of 5.0 per square mile (1.9/km^{2}). The racial makeup of the township was 97.60% White, 0.40% Native American, 0.80% Asian, and 1.20% from two or more races. Hispanic or Latino of any race were 1.60% of the population.

There were 177 households, out of which 35.6% had children under the age of 18 living with them, 65.0% were married couples living together, 6.2% had a female householder with no husband present, and 23.2% were non-families. 17.5% of all households were made up of individuals, and 8.5% had someone living alone who was 65 years of age or older. The average household size was 2.71 and the average family size was 3.04.

In the township the population was spread out, with 26.5% under the age of 18, 5.2% from 18 to 24, 29.9% from 25 to 44, 24.4% from 45 to 64, and 14.0% who were 65 years of age or older. The median age was 38 years. For every 100 females, there were 109.7 males. For every 100 females age 18 and over, there were 107.3 males.

The median income for a household in the township was $48,125, and the median income for a family was $53,393. Males had a median income of $30,000 versus $26,250 for females. The per capita income for the township was $17,227. About 3.6% of families and 6.2% of the population were below the poverty line, including 9.0% of those under age 18 and 16.7% of those age 65 or over.
