= Grand Army of the Republic Hall (Litchfield, Minnesota) =

- Grand Army of the Republic Hall; Litchfield, Minnesota
- U.S. National Register of Historic Places
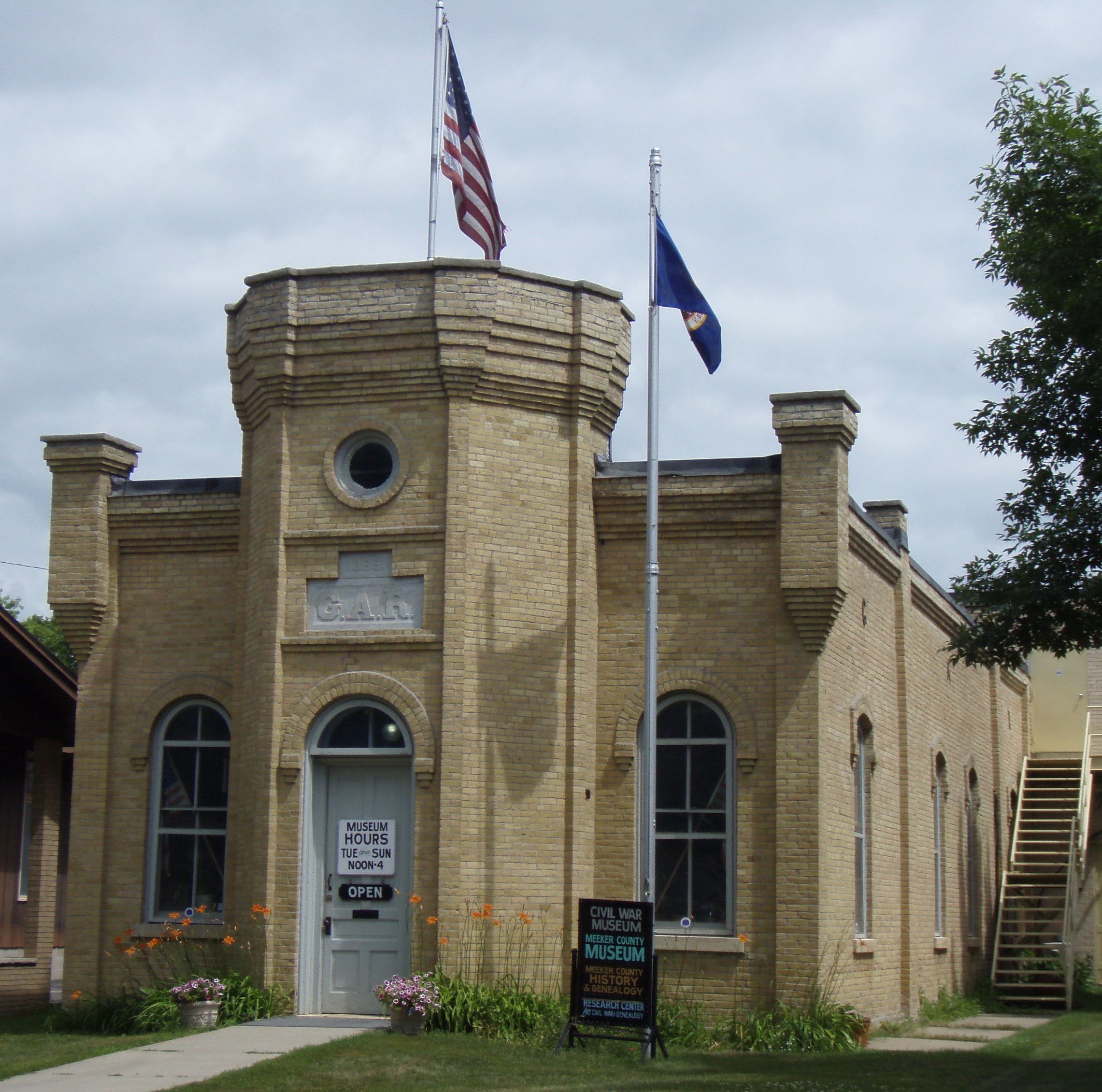

- Location within Minnesota
- Location: 370 N. Marshall St. Litchfield, Minnesota
- Coordinates: 45°07′45″N 94°31′35″W
- Built: 1885
- NRHP reference No.: 75000995
- Added to NRHP: May 21, 1975

The Grand Army of the Republic Hall in Litchfield, Minnesota is one of many original and authentic Grand Army of the Republic halls remaining in the United States. Built in 1885 for the Frank Daggett GAR Post No. 35, it is one of four remaining GAR halls in Minnesota. On May 21, 1975, it was added to the National Register of Historic Places.

The Meeker County Historical Society Museum building was added to the rear of it in 1960, but the Hall was left exactly as it was when the "Boys of '61", as they called themselves, met there 75 years earlier in 1885.

== History ==
After the Civil War, twenty-seven veterans from Minnesota's Meeker County founded a chapter of the Grand Army of the Republic, a service organization begun in Illinois in 1866 by Dr. B. F. Stephenson. Meeker County's original organization was called the Edward Branham Post. The membership was limited to honorably discharged veterans of the Union Army, Navy, Marine Corps and the Revenue Cutter Service who had served between April 12, 1861, and April 9, 1865. With a motto of "Fraternity, Charity and Loyalty", the organization's purpose was to maintain fellowship for the men who fought to preserve the Union and to help handicapped veterans and the widows and orphans of veterans.

A new Post was started in July 1883. It was named after Lt. Frank E. Daggett, the Post's ranking member and later a Grand Commander of the Minnesota GAR. He had been actively associated with abolitionist John Brown and the commander of two all-black heavy artillery regiments during the Civil War. Daggett, who was only five feet six inches in height and weighed nearly two hundred and fifty pounds, came to Meeker County in 1872 and was the editor of the Litchfield Ledger, one of the earliest newspapers in the county. He died at the age of 39 in 1876.

The Post met in the old county courthouse, which was next to the Howard House hotel on Sibley Avenue. The hotel has since been torn down. A meeting hall was needed to accommodate the local membership, which had grown to one hundred and forty veterans. A suitable lot by Central Park was bought from Reuben S. Hershey. Henry Ames, a post member and owner of a brickyard northeast of Litchfield, donated the bricks to build the hall. Construction began in early 1885. The total cost was $5000. The hall was finished in the late fall and was dedicated on November 14, 1885. Shortly after the dedication, the members deeded the Memorial Hall, as they called it, to the Village of Litchfield with the condition that it be kept "as is" as a memorial to the Veterans of the Civil War and be opened to the public for reading. It became the first public library in Meeker County.

The city has kept the meeting room as it was at the last meeting. In that meeting room there are large portraits on the north wall of most of the original members and the same chairs that were used by them in 1885. At their first meeting, the members brought their own chairs from their homes to the Hall. So all the chairs, now painted gray, are different from each other, but generally just ordinary kitchen table chairs. The original organ is also there along with other original furniture.

In 1889 the Post was given an oak log from the actual Acton cabin where five members of the Jones family became the first settlers killed in the Dakota Indian War of 1862, previously called the Sioux Uprising. It was taken to a sawmill in Forest City and made into lumber from which an altar, in the center of the room, and a gavel, which were both used during the meetings, were made. The altar is 32 ½ inches square and 36 inches high. It has a cushioned top covered with heavy leather. In the northwest corner of the meeting room is a miniature model of the Jones cabin and it was also made from wood from that log.

The Civil War cannons on the front lawn have been brought inside the Hall and displayed near the entrance. The entrance room, with a guest book, is a Civil War museum in its own right with tall glass showcases displaying rifles, uniforms, flags and other Civil War artifacts, such as munitions, medals and ribbons. The hall actually had many more artifacts but it was broken into several years ago and many of the Civil War rifles were taken.

GAR members started the celebration of Memorial Day in 1868. W. A. Olmstead, who died in 1933, was the last Civil War veteran and GAR member to live in Litchfield. Albert H. DeLong was the last Meeker County veteran. He died on February 10, 1936. He was an Indian scout. He and Vincent Coombs went to Acton after the Jones family's massacre to bury the bodies and pursue the Indians into Kandiyohi Woods. The last GAR member in the United States was Albert Woolson, from Duluth, Minnesota, who died in 1956. One member of Litchfield's GAR was unusual, at least for that very Scandinavian town. He was black and his name was Allison or Albert Van Spence.

== Meeker County Historical Museum ==
The GAR Hall serves as the entrance to the Meeker County Historical Museum. Many visitors come to do genealogical research in the museum. It has county plat books, records of obituaries, lists of cemetery markers and many old local newspapers. There are many artifacts from the pioneer days of the county, including an actual 1868 log cabin that is accessible. Upstairs is a replica of pioneer O. A. Jacobson's Crow River Store. The entire downtown of Litchfield, between Depot Street and Third Street, is listed on the National Register of Historic Places.

The GAR Hall and the museum are open to the public Tuesday through Saturday 10 AM to 4 PM. Admission is $3.00 and children 12 and under are free. Litchfield is located at the intersection of Highways 12 and 22, about sixty-five miles straight west of Minneapolis.
