= Collinwood Township, Meeker County, Minnesota =

Collinwood Township, Minnesota
- Township
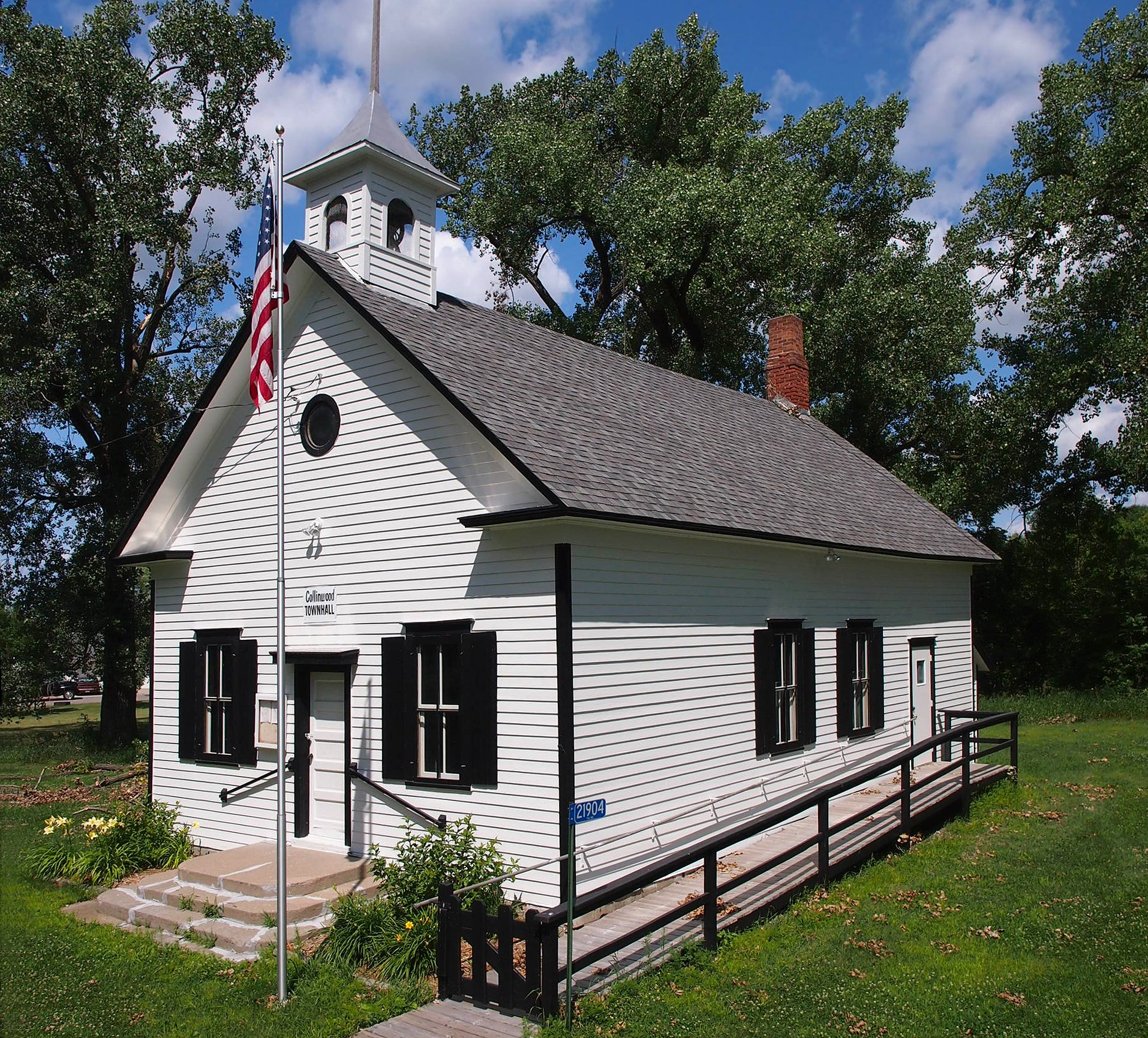
- Collinwood Town Hall, built as a schoolhouse in 1870

- Location within the state of Minnesota Collinwood Township, Minnesota (the United States)
- Coordinates: 45°1′N 94°19′W
- Country: United States
- State: Minnesota
- County: Meeker

Area
  - Total: 36.1 sq mi (93.4 km^{2})
  - Land: 31.0 sq mi (80.4 km^{2})
  - Water: 5.0 sq mi (13.0 km^{2})
- Elevation: 1,125 ft (343 m)

Population (2000)
  - Total: 1,037
  - Density: 33/sq mi (12.9/km^{2})
- Time zone: UTC-6 (Central (CST))
  - Summer (DST): UTC-5 (CDT)
- FIPS code: 27-12628
- GNIS feature ID: 0663849

Collinwood Township is a township in Meeker County, Minnesota, United States. The population was 1,037 at the 2000 census.

== History ==
Collinwood Township was named after Collinwood, Canada, where the first settlers in the area came from. There is also a Collinwood Lake nearby. For a few years, the township was known as New Virginia (the 1870 U.S. Census lists it as such). In May of 1866, the first settlers came. They were Oliver Rasnick, Henry Fuller, George Fuller, and Jacob, Nancy, and Thomas Hutchins. The town was organized on May 8, 1866. The first Justice of the Peace was Oliver Rasnick. The first death was the child of E. K. and Jane Counts, who were from Virginia. In 1857, John Taylor and Elizabeth Hutchins were the first couple to be married there. Also that year, Alexander Ramsey married Margaret Hutchins. The population was 1,037 in the 2000 census.

== Geography ==
According to the United States Census Bureau, the township has a total area of 36.1 square miles (93 km^{2}), of which 31.0 square miles (80 km^{2}) is land and 5.0 square miles (13 km^{2}) (13.92%) is water.

Collinwood Township is located in Township 118 North of the Arkansas Base Line and Range 29 West of the 5th Principal Meridian.

== Demographics ==
As of the census of 2000, there were 1,037 people, 364 households, and 289 families residing in the township. The population density was 33.4 inhabitants per square mile (12.9/km^{2}). There were 462 housing units at an average density of 14.9 per square mile (5.8/km^{2}). The racial makeup of the township was 99.32% White, 0.10% Asian, 0.19% from other races, and 0.39% from two or more races. Hispanic or Latino of any race were 0.77% of the population.

There were 364 households, out of which 36.3% had children under the age of 18 living with them, 73.9% were married couples living together, 2.5% had a female householder with no husband present, and 20.6% were non-families. 16.2% of all households were made up of individuals, and 5.8% had someone living alone who was 65 years of age or older. The average household size was 2.85 and the average family size was 3.16.

In the township the population was spread out, with 28.0% under the age of 18, 5.4% from 18 to 24, 25.6% from 25 to 44, 27.9% from 45 to 64, and 13.2% who were 65 years of age or older. The median age was 40 years. For every 100 females, there were 114.3 males. For every 100 females age 18 and over, there were 113.4 males.

The median income for a household in the township was $56,786, and the median income for a family was $63,295. Males had a median income of $41,200 versus $30,000 for females. The per capita income for the township was $22,065. About 4.1% of families and 6.2% of the population were below the poverty line, including 11.6% of those under age 18 and 1.6% of those age 65 or over.

== Steelesville ==
Located within the township is an area known as Steelesville. The community of Steelesville was first delineated by the school district of the same name. The school was a typical rural America one-room school building occupied by students in grades one through eight who resided in the confines of the Steelesville School district. Also located within the Steelesville community is the Steelesville Cemetery. The Steelesville Cemetery is a one-acre active cemetery, owned by Gethsemane Lutheran Church, Dassel, Minnesota, and maintained by the Steelesville Cemetery Association.
