= Greenleaf Township, Meeker County, Minnesota =

Greenleaf Township, Minnesota
- Township
- Location within the state of Minnesota Greenleaf Township, Minnesota (the United States)
- Coordinates: 45°2′N 94°34′W
- Country: United States
- State: Minnesota
- County: Meeker

Area
  - Total: 39.0 sq mi (100.9 km^{2})
  - Land: 35.8 sq mi (92.7 km^{2})
  - Water: 3.2 sq mi (8.2 km^{2})
- Elevation: 1,165 ft (355 m)

Population (2000)
  - Total: 726
  - Density: 20/sq mi (7.8/km^{2})
- Time zone: UTC-6 (Central (CST))
  - Summer (DST): UTC-5 (CDT)
- ZIP code: 55355
- Area code: 320
- FIPS code: 27-25730
- GNIS feature ID: 0664343

Greenleaf Township is a township in Meeker County, Minnesota, United States. The population was 726 at the 2000 census.

== History ==
Greenleaf Township was organized in 1859, and named for William Henry Greenleaf, a pioneer settler.

== Geography ==
According to the United States Census Bureau, the township has a total area of 39.0 square miles (101 km^{2}), of which 35.8 square miles (93 km^{2}) is land and 3.2 square miles (8.3 km^{2}) (8.13%) is water.

Greenleaf Township is located in Township 118 North of the Arkansas Base Line and Range 31 West of the 5th Principal Meridian.

== Demographics ==
As of the census of 2000, there were 726 people, 298 households, and 232 families residing in the township. The population density was 20.3 inhabitants per square mile (7.8/km^{2}). There were 478 housing units at an average density of 13.3 per square mile (5.1/km^{2}). The racial makeup of the township was 98.62% White, 0.14% African American, 0.14% Asian, 0.55% from other races, and 0.55% from two or more races. Hispanic or Latino of any race were 1.10% of the population.

There were 298 households, out of which 25.5% had children under the age of 18 living with them, 71.8% were married couples living together, 2.3% had a female householder with no husband present, and 22.1% were non-families. 18.8% of all households were made up of individuals, and 5.4% had someone living alone who was 65 years of age or older. The average household size was 2.44 and the average family size was 2.75.

In the township the population was spread out, with 21.6% under the age of 18, 5.6% from 18 to 24, 25.1% from 25 to 44, 32.2% from 45 to 64, and 15.4% who were 65 years of age or older. The median age was 44 years. For every 100 females, there were 109.2 males. For every 100 females age 18 and over, there were 110.7 males.

The median income for a household in the township was $46,190, and the median income for a family was $51,458. Males had a median income of $32,917 versus $26,146 for females. The per capita income for the township was $21,973. About 1.8% of families and 1.9% of the population were below the poverty line, including 0.9% of those under age 18 and 4.2% of those age 65 or over.
