= Dassel, Minnesota =

City in Minnesota, United States

- City
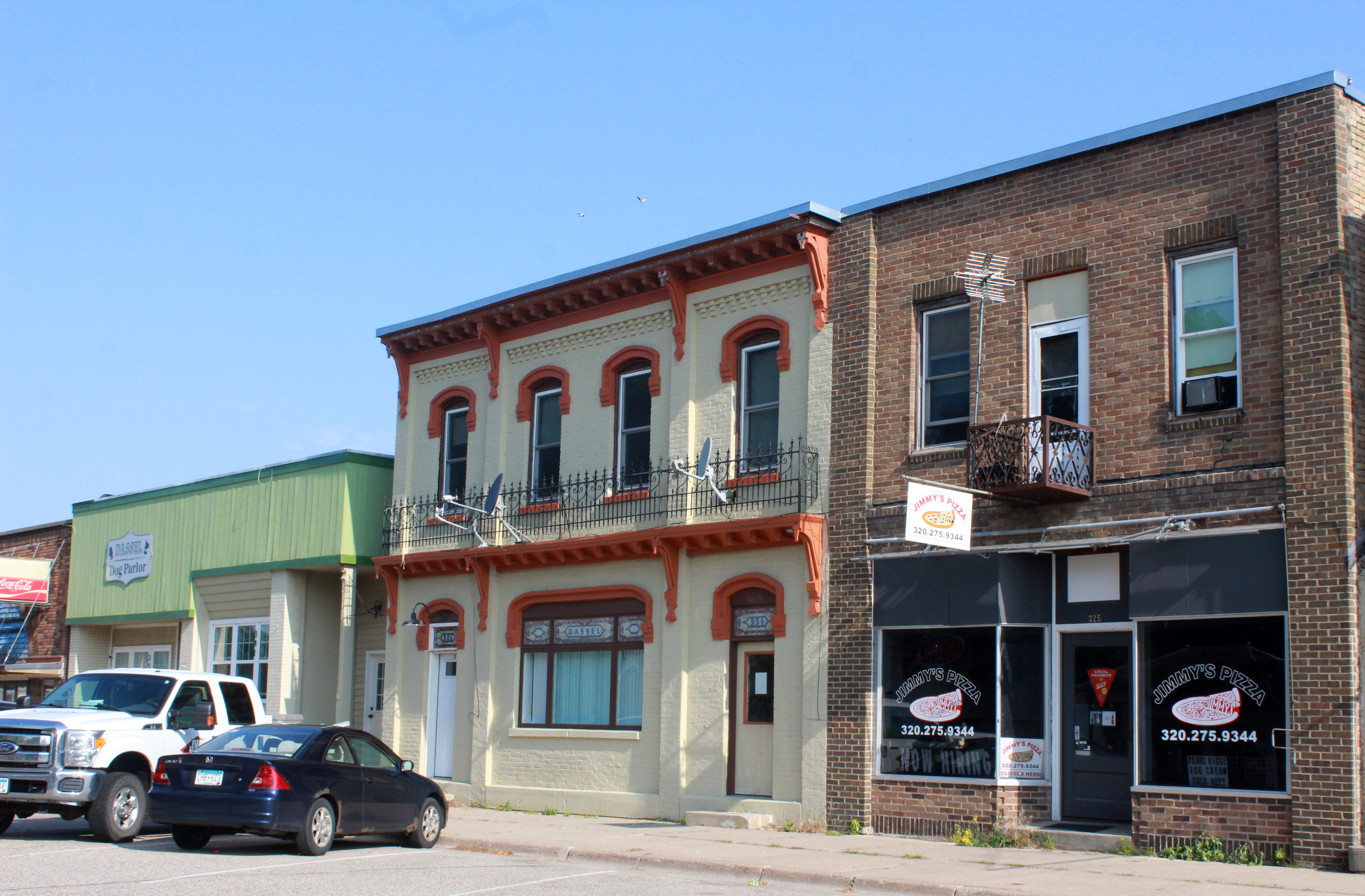
- Businesses along Atlantic Avenue

- Location of Dassel within Meeker County, Minnesota
- Coordinates: 45°04′59″N 94°18′53″W
- Country: United States
- State: Minnesota
- County: Meeker
- Founded: 1869
- Incorporated: February 28, 1878

Government
  - Mayor: Bob Lalone

Area
  - Total: 1.69 sq mi (4.39 km^{2})
  - Land: 1.68 sq mi (4.36 km^{2})
  - Water: 0.012 sq mi (0.03 km^{2})
- Elevation: 1,080 ft (330 m)

Population (2020)
  - Total: 1,472
  - Estimate (2022): 1,483
  - Density: 881.16/sq mi (340.22/km^{2})
- Time zone: UTC−6 (Central (CST))
  - Summer (DST): UTC−5 (CDT)
- ZIP Code: 55325
- Area code: 320
- FIPS code: 27-14878
- GNIS feature ID: 2393722
- Sales tax: 6.875%
- Website: dassel.com

Dassel (/ˈdæsəl/ DASS-əl) is a city in Meeker County, Minnesota, United States. The population was 1,472 at the 2020 census.

== History ==
Dassel was platted in 1869 and named for Bernard Dassel, a railroad official. A post office has been in operation at Dassel since 1869. Dassel was incorporated in 1878.

== Geography ==
Dassel is in eastern Meeker County. U.S. Highway 12 and Minnesota State Highway 15 are two of the main routes in the city. US 12 passes through Dassel as Parker Avenue, leading west-northwest 11 miles (18 km) to Litchfield, the Meeker county seat, and east 6 miles (10 km) to Cokato, while MN 15 passes through the west side of the city, leading north 16 miles (26 km) to Kimball and south 15 miles (24 km) to Hutchinson.

According to the U.S. Census Bureau, Dassel has an area of 1.69 square miles (4.38 km^{2}), of which 1.68 square miles (4.35 km^{2}) is land and 0.01 square miles (0.03 km^{2}), or 0.65%, are water. The city is bordered to the northeast by Spring Lake and to the southwest by Sellards Lake.

== Education ==
Dassel Elementary was recognized as one of 219 public schools in the nation as a 2012 National Blue Ribbon School based on academic excellence. In the Bloomberg Businessweek list "The Best Places to Raise Your Kids 2011", Dassel finished as runner-up for Minnesota, behind Cokato.

== Demographics ==
Historical population
Census	Pop.	Note	%±
1880	247		—
1890	552		123.5%
1900	568		2.9%
1910	643		13.2%
1920	804		25.0%
1930	785		−2.4%
1940	872		11.1%
1950	962		10.3%
1960	863		−10.3%
1970	1,058		22.6%
1980	1,066		0.8%
1990	1,082		1.5%
2000	1,233		14.0%
2010	1,469		19.1%
2020	1,472		0.2%
2022 (est.)	1,483		0.7%
U.S. Decennial Census; 2020 Census

=== 2010 census ===
As of the 2010 census, there were 1,469 people, 572 households, and 370 families residing in the city. The population density was 901.2 inhabitants per square mile (348.0/km^{2}). There were 620 housing units at an average density of 380.4 per square mile (146.9/km^{2}). The racial makeup of the city was 95.4% White, 0.3% African American, 1.0% Native American, 0.8% Asian, 0.5% Pacific Islander, 1.0% from other races, and 1.0% from two or more races. Hispanic or Latino of any race were 2.0% of the population.

There were 572 households, of which 31.6% had children under the age of 18 living with them, 51.2% were married couples living together, 7.9% had a female householder with no husband present, 5.6% had a male householder with no wife present, and 35.3% were non-families. 30.8% of all households were made up of individuals, and 14.8% had someone living alone who was 65 years of age or older. The average household size was 2.46 and the average family size was 3.10.

The median age in the city was 35.9 years. 27.1% of residents were under the age of 18; 8.6% were between the ages of 18 and 24; 24.8% were from 25 to 44; 19.6% were from 45 to 64; and 19.9% were 65 years of age or older. The gender makeup of the city was 48.3% male and 51.7% female.

=== 2000 census ===
As of the 2000 census, there were 1,233 people, 515 households, and 313 families residing in the city. The population density was 832.7 inhabitants per square mile (321.5/km^{2}). There were 551 housing units at an average density of 372.1 per square mile (143.7/km^{2}). The racial makeup of the city was 97.57% White, 0.16% Native American, 0.41% Asian, 1.62% from other races, and 0.24% from two or more races. Hispanic or Latino of any race were 1.87% of the population. 30.8% were of German, 25.6% Swedish, 11.4% Norwegian, 8.6% Finnish, and 6.7% Irish ancestry.

There were 515 households, out of which 29.3% had children under the age of 18 living with them, 52.0% were married couples living together, 5.2% had a female householder with no husband present, and 39.2% were non-families. 35.3% of all households were made up of individuals, and 19.0% had someone living alone who was 65 years of age or older. The average household size was 2.28 and the average family size was 2.97.

In the city, the population was spread out, with 24.0% under the age of 18, 7.5% from 18 to 24, 27.1% from 25 to 44, 19.1% from 45 to 64, and 22.4% who were 65 years of age or older. The median age was 39 years. For every 100 females, there were 90.0 males. For every 100 females age 18 and over, there were 81.6 males.

The median income for a household in the city was $37,500, and the median income for a family was $48,854. Males had a median income of $30,759 versus $22,121 for females. The per capita income for the city was $17,476. About 3.7% of families and 5.0% of the population were below the poverty line, including 2.8% of those under age 18 and 12.7% of those age 65 or over.

== Government and politics ==
The mayor of Dassel is Robert (Bob) Lalone. City council members include Daniel Landrus, Darren Sombke, and Marie Thurn. Terri Boese is the city clerk/treasurer. City council meetings are held the third Monday of each month at 7pm at Dassel City Hall.

== Culture ==
=== Dassel History Center & Ergot Museum ===
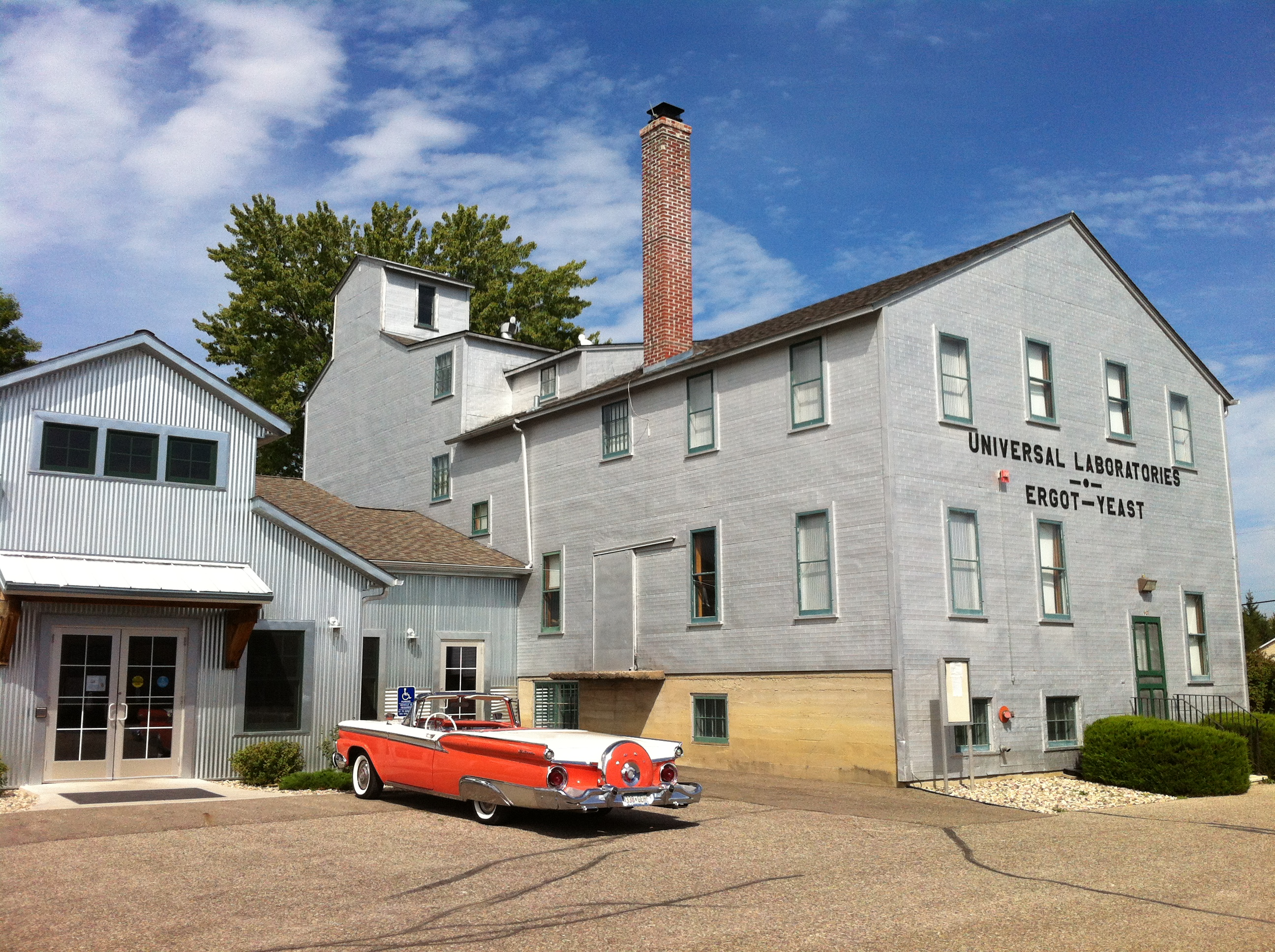
Dassel History Center & Ergot Museum

The Dassel History Center & Ergot Museum occupies the Universal Laboratories building, a structure listed on the National Register of Historic Places for its role in ergot production from the mid-1930s to the late 1960s. The center opened in 2006 under the operation of the Dassel Area Historical Society. Exhibits document Dassel's history and the impact of ergot, a fungus with medical applications, as well as the area’s agricultural heritage and the story of Minnesota Senator Magnus Johnson. The center maintains a research collection with records, newspapers, photographs, and family histories.

=== Red Rooster Days ===
On Labor Day weekend, Dassel holds Red Rooster Days, a tradition that originated in 1959. Red Rooster Days is an annual community festival that brings residents and visitors together for a mix of local traditions and entertainment. It features the region's largest parade, a chicken barbecue, fireworks, and the coronation of Dassel Ambassadors. The highlight is the Monday chicken barbecue, billed as the largest in the state.

== Gallery ==
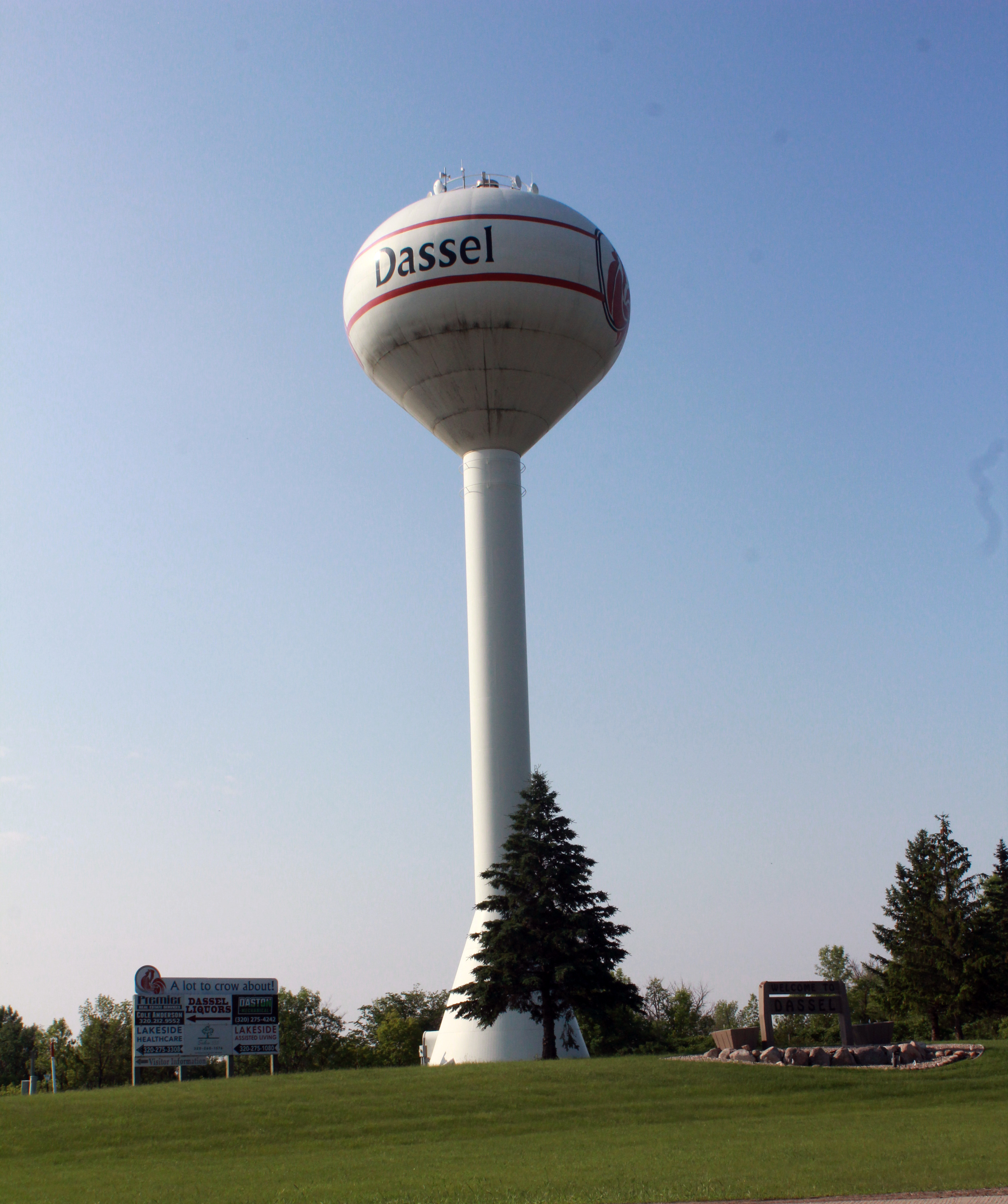
Water tower

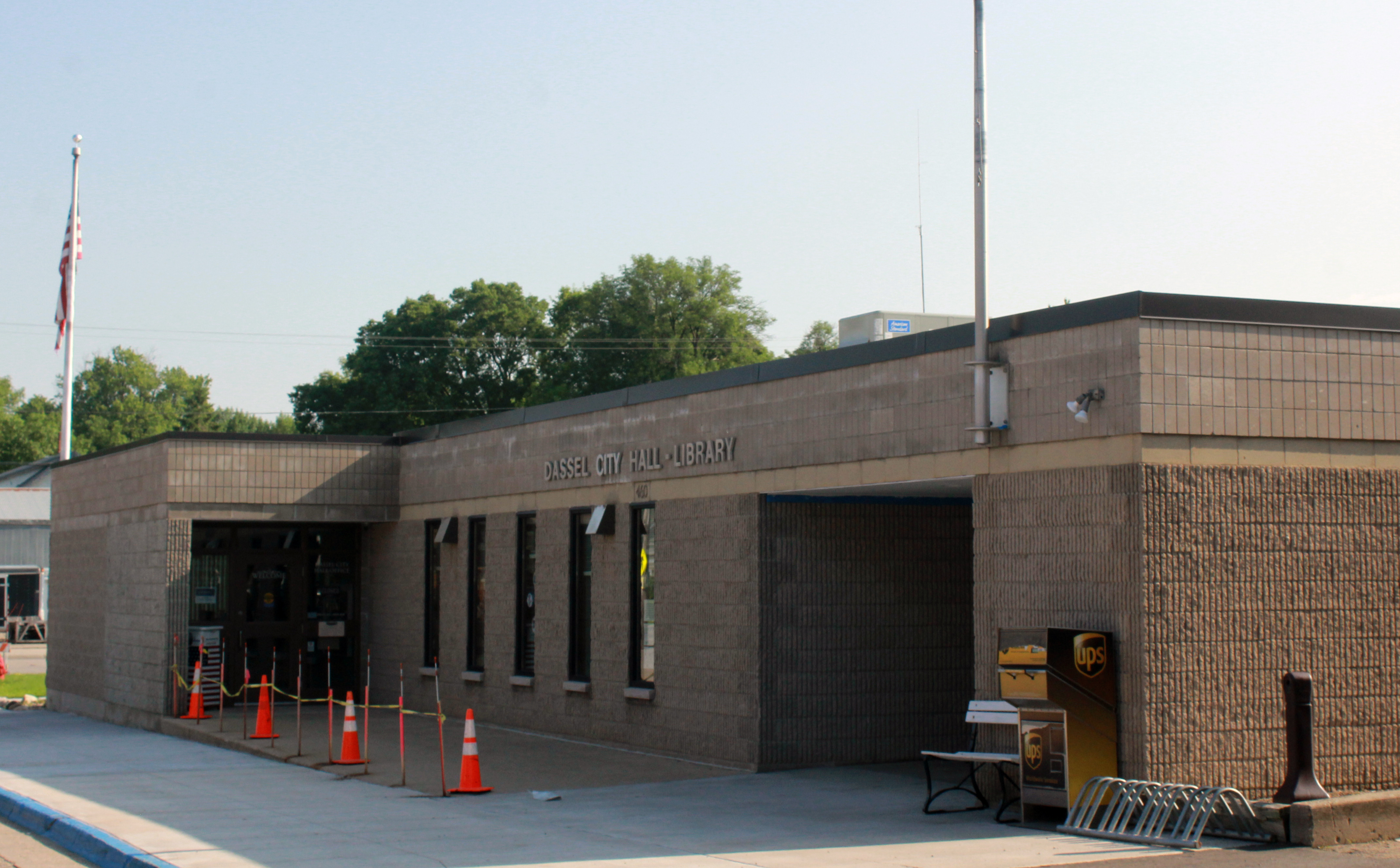
City Hall & Library

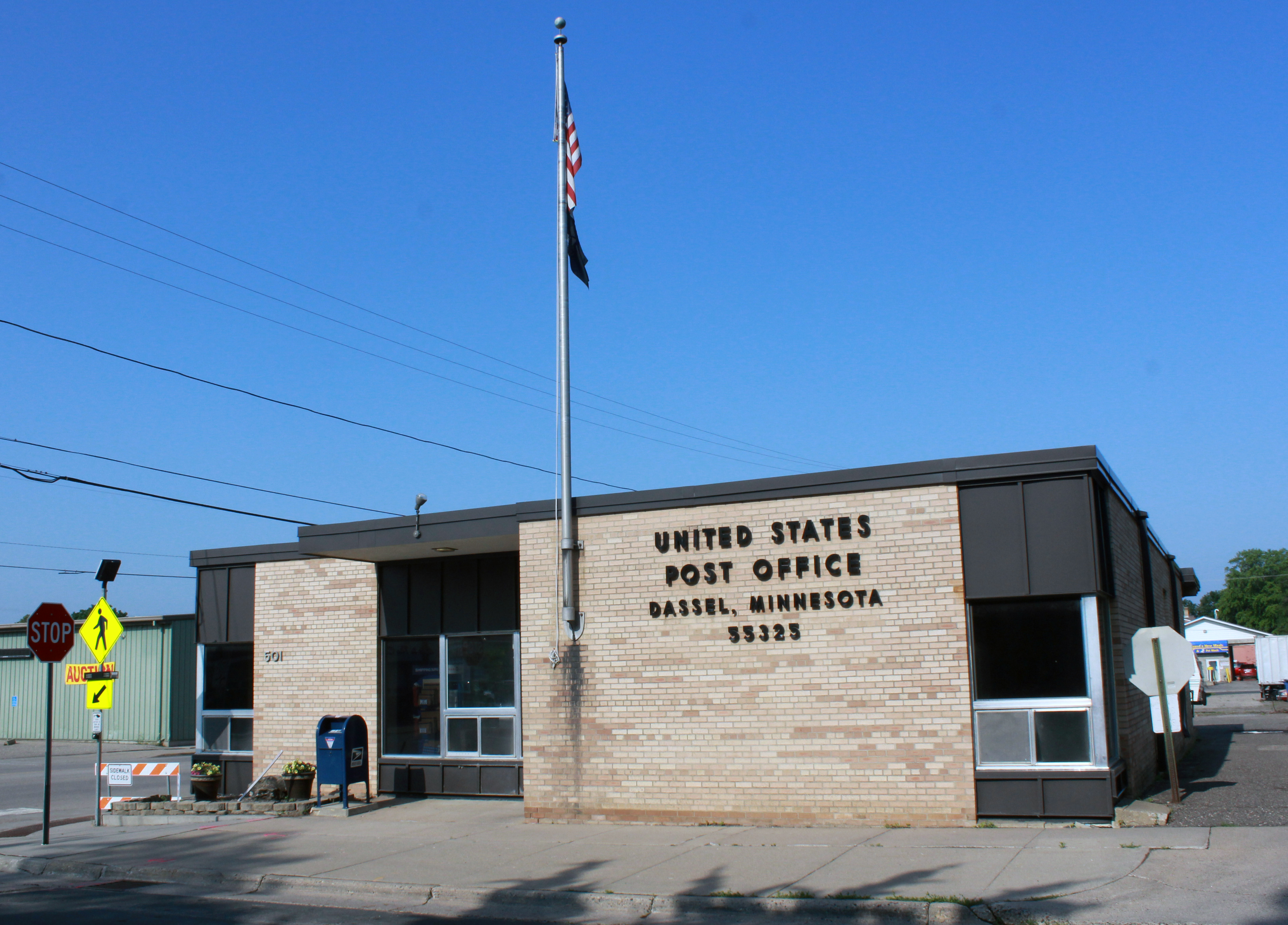
Post Office

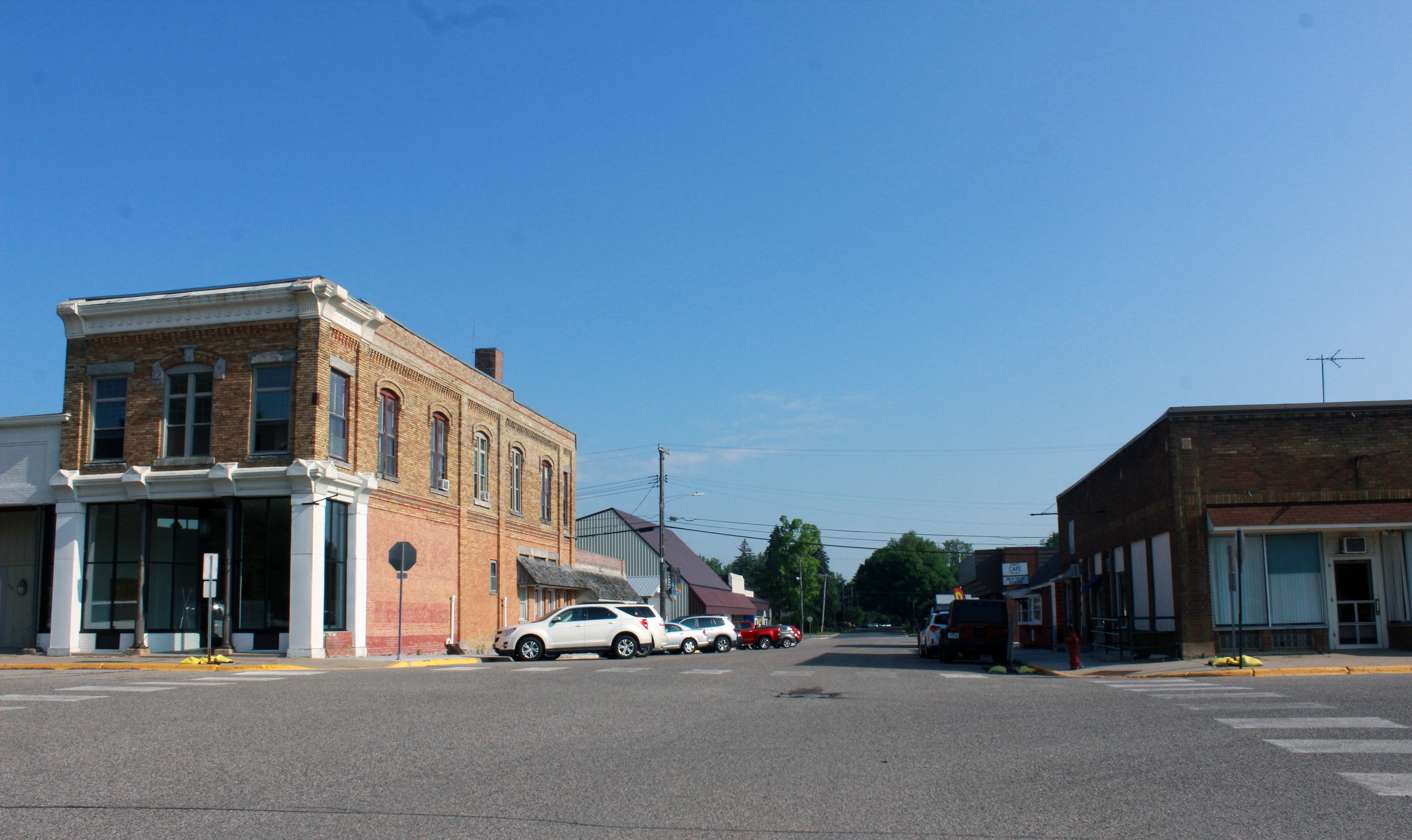
Atlantic Avenue at 3rd Street

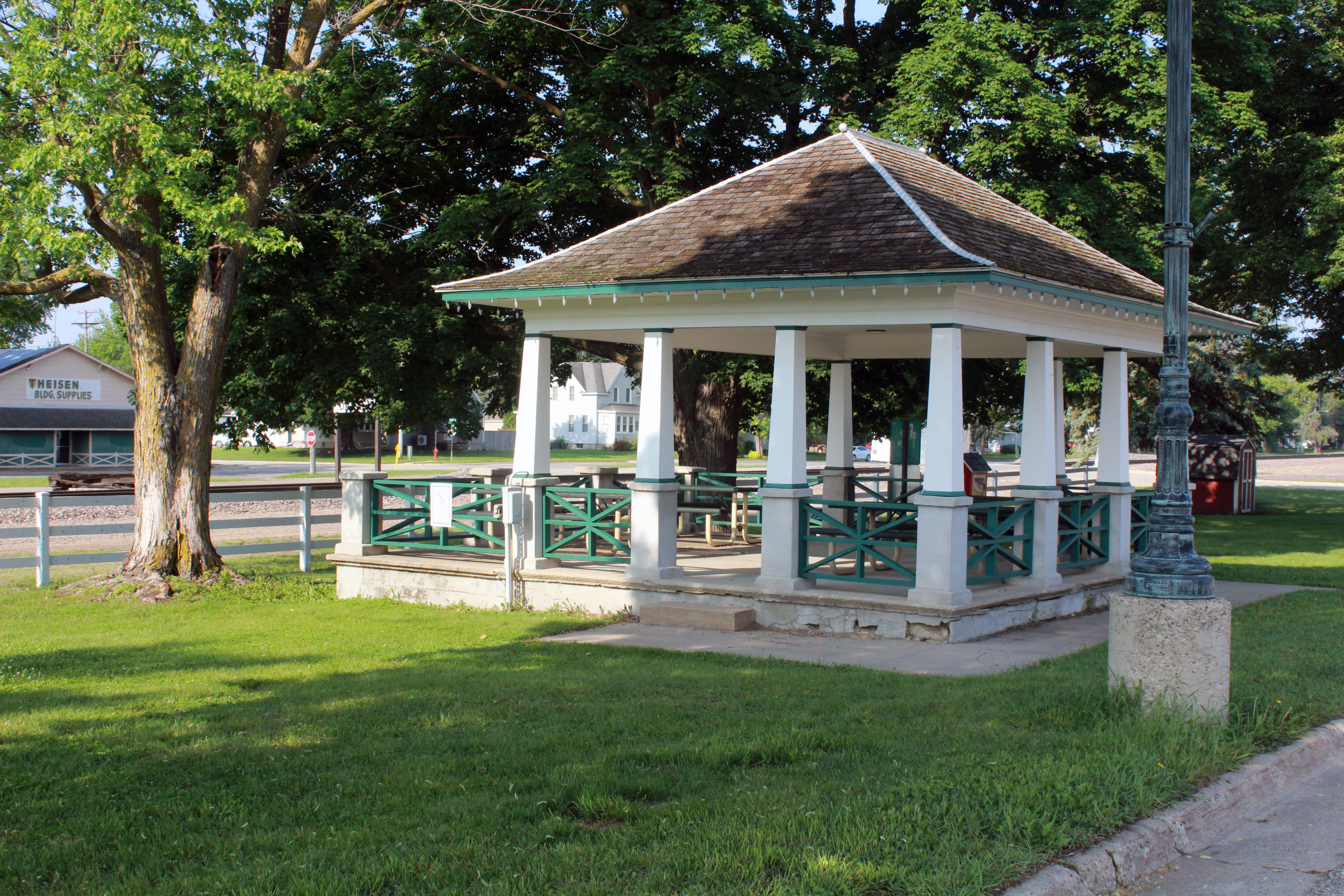
Picnic Shelter
