= James B. Atkinson =

Canadian-American politician

- Atkinson c. 1858

Member of the Minnesota House of Representatives from the 20th District
- In office December 2, 1857 – December 6, 1859

Sheriff of Meeker County, Minnesota
- In office 1862–1865

Personal details
- Born: James Benton Atkinson; November 13, 1822 Kingston, Ontario, Upper Canada
- Died: December 7, 1894 (aged 72) Litchfield, Minnesota, U.S.

Military service
- Allegiance: United States of America
- Branch/service: Union Army
- Years of service: 1862–1865
- Rank: Captain
- Unit: Company D, 2nd Minnesota Cavalry Regiment; Company H, 1st Minnesota Heavy Artillery Regiment
- Commands: Company H, 1st Minnesota Heavy Artillery Regiment
- Battles/wars: Dakota War of 1862; Attack on Forest City; Battle of Acton; Sully's Expedition (1863–1864); Battle of Killdeer Mountain; Battle of the Badlands; American Civil War

James Benton Atkinson (November 13, 1822 – December 7, 1894) was a Canadian American businessman, politician, military officer, and early citizen of Forest City, Minnesota. Atkinson served a single term in the 1st Minnesota Legislature and later fought in both the Dakota War of 1862 and the American Civil War.

== Early life and education ==
Atkinson was born on November 13, 1822, in Kingston, Ontario, he was the son of John Atkinson and Ann (Atty) Atkinson who were English emigrants from Yorkshire.^{:156}^{:91} Atkinson's family later moved to Black Rock, New York where he lived for much of his childhood.^{:156} Atkinson was educated in common school before working in the printing trade in Freeport, Pennsylvania.^{:156}^{:91-92}

== Career ==
Beginning in 1853 Atkinson began work as a railroad contractor for the Allegheny Valley Railroad, Atkinson later worked for the St. Louis, Iron Mountain and Southern Railway.^{:92} Atkinson returned to Freeport in 1855 before speculating land in Iowa and Missouri.^{:92} In the spring of 1856 Atkinson moved to Minnesota Territory choosing to settle in Forest City, Minnesota in Meeker County.^{:92} Once in Forest City, Atkinson continued to work in the mercantile trade while operating both a general store and hotel until 1879.^{:157}

== Political career ==
Atkinson began his political career on October 13, 1857, when he was elected to represent Meeker County, Benton County, and Stearns County in the Minnesota House of Representatives. Atkinson would serve in the 1st Minnesota Legislature from December 2, 1857, to December 6, 1859. During his term Atkinson was a member of the Rules and Joint Rules committee.

Atkinson also held several local offices in Meeker County including sheriff (1862–1865), county commissioner, assessor, and justice of the peace.^{:157-158}^{:92}

== Military service ==
During the American Civil War Atkinson and George Carlos Whitcomb worked as military recruiters for a company of volunteers to serve in the 6th Minnesota Infantry Regiment.^{:157} Atkinson and Whitcomb's recruiting efforts were hindered however due to the outbreak of the Dakota War of 1862.^{:157} Atkinson and Whitcomb quickly formed the Sibley Guards militiawith Atkinson being elected as the militia's First Lieutenant.^{:157}

Atkinson would formally join the Union Army as a private and military scout for Company D of the 2nd Minnesota Cavalry Regiment on November 4, 1863.^{:157}^{:723} Atkinson would serve in Sully's Expedition with the 2nd Minnesota Cavalry until being transferred to command Company H of the 1st Minnesota Heavy Artillery Regiment on February 20, 1865. Atkinson would serve with the 1st Minnesota Heavy Artillery in Chattanooga, Tennessee before being mustered out of service on September 27, 1865.^{:157}^{:602}

== Later life and death ==
Following his military service Atkinson continued to work as a mercantile businessman and local Meeker County politician.

Atkinson died on December 7, 1894, in Litchfield, Minnesota.

== Personal life ==
Atkinson was married to Abigail A. Sholes in Allegheny, Pennsylvania on March 20, 1845, together they had eight children.^{:156}^{:92}
