= Battle of Acton =

1862 battle in Minnesota, US

- Part of Dakota War of 1862, American Civil War
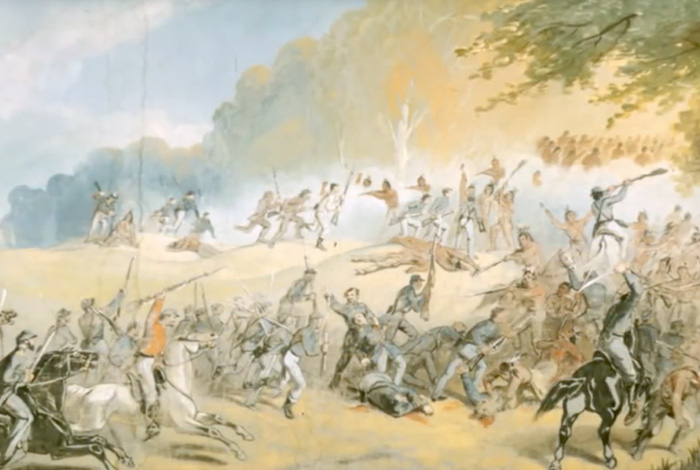
- Battle of Acton panel from the 1892-93 Gag-Heller-Schwendiger panorama
Date	September 3, 1862
Location	Acton, Minnesota, Meeker County, Minnesota 45°05′03″N 94°39′39″W
Result	See Aftermath

Belligerents
United States	Santee-Sioux

Commanders and leaders
Captain Richard Strout	Chief Little Crow; Walker Among Stones

Units involved
Company B, 10th Minnesota Infantry Regiment	Bands of Walker Among Stones and Chief Little Crow

Strength
55; 64	75 under Walker Among Stones; 35 under Little Crow

Casualties and losses
3 Killed; 15–23 Wounded; 3 Died of wounds 2 Wagons and their teams	Unknown

The Battle of Acton (also referred to as the Battle of Kelly's Bluff) was fought between the United States Army and the warrior bands of Chief Little Crow and Walker Among Stones during the Dakota War of 1862. Following the defeats at Fort Ridgley and New Ulm, Chief Little Crow led an incursion north out of the Minnesota River Valley into central Minnesota. Company B of the Tenth Minnesota Infantry Regiment commanded by Captain Richard Strout was sent to protect the citizens of Meeker County.

On September 2, Company B made camp near the town of Acton. Strout was warned overnight that the Dakota were encamped with around 100 men nearby split into two groups. Marching southeast on September 3, 1862, Strout's men were attacked by Little Crow's men, then Walker Among Stones's men from the front, rear, and flanks multiple times, but managed to reach the relative safety of the stockaded town of Hutchinson.

== Background ==
=== Dakota Change of Strategy ===
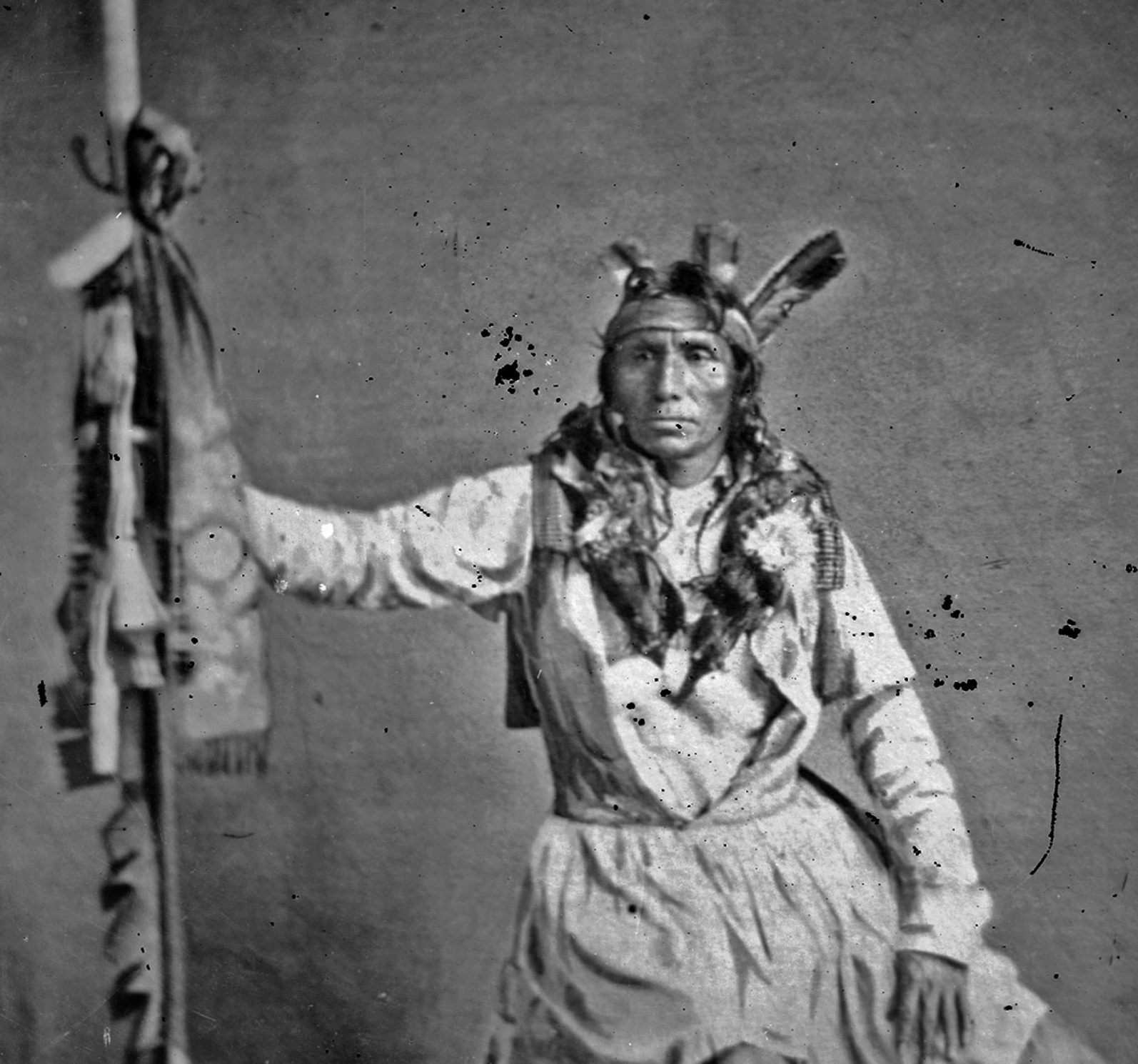
Chief Little Crow

After being repulsed at Fort Ridgely and New Ulm, Dakota leaders Little Crow, Mankato, and Big Eagle planned their next course of action. Little Crow wished to strike north into the Big Woods. He believed the local settlements to be lightly defended and that supplies such as flour were plentiful. Success in the Big Woods may have also allowed Little Crow to fall on the northern flank of Colonel Henry Hastings Sibley at Fort Ridgely and attack his supply trains. Gray Bird, Mankato and Big Eagle, however, chose to continue their campaign along the Minnesota River. Along the way, Walker Among Stones, Little Crow's second-in-command, disagreed with his strategy. Wishing to plunder the countryside, he garnered the support of 75 other men, leaving Little Crow with just 35.

=== Arrival of Strout's Troops ===
When news spread to the Twin Cities of the massacres occurring in western Minnesota, many companies mustering for service in the Civil War were hastily dispatched to quell the uprising. Among these was Captain Richard Strout's Company B, then part of the Tenth Minnesota Infantry Regiment. On this journey, Strout's company consisted of 55-65 men, about 20 of which were newly enlisted and undrilled soldiers, the rest being civilian volunteers. In addition, the company was only armed with antiquated smooth-bore Austrian muskets.

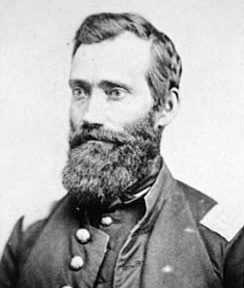
Captain Richard Strout

Strout's command reported to Militia General John H. Stevens, the commander of state forces in the northern frontier and were ordered to march to Glencoe, for which they started for from Minneapolis On August 26. Along the way they impressed some civilian wagon teams into service. By September 2 the men pitched their tents in front of the home of Mr. Robinson Jones, where the murder of Jones and several others by several young Dakota men on August 17, in what was later termed the Acton Incident, had shed the first blood of the conflict.

== Battle ==
=== September 2-3 ===
While Strout's company camped at the Jones Cabin, Captain George C. Whitcomb of the Forest City Home Guard encountered a messenger from Company B. Whitcomb's squad of militia had just escaped a close encounter with a large number of Dakota 12 miles from Forest City, so it was immediately apparent the danger Strout's command was in. Calling for volunteers to warn Capt. Strout, three men answered: Jesse V. Branham, Jr., Thomas G. Holmes, and Albert H. Sperry. Knowing that it would be a long journey for them in the dark, with a large number of hostile Dakota in the area, Capt. Whitcomb later remarked, "I feared I would never see them again.".

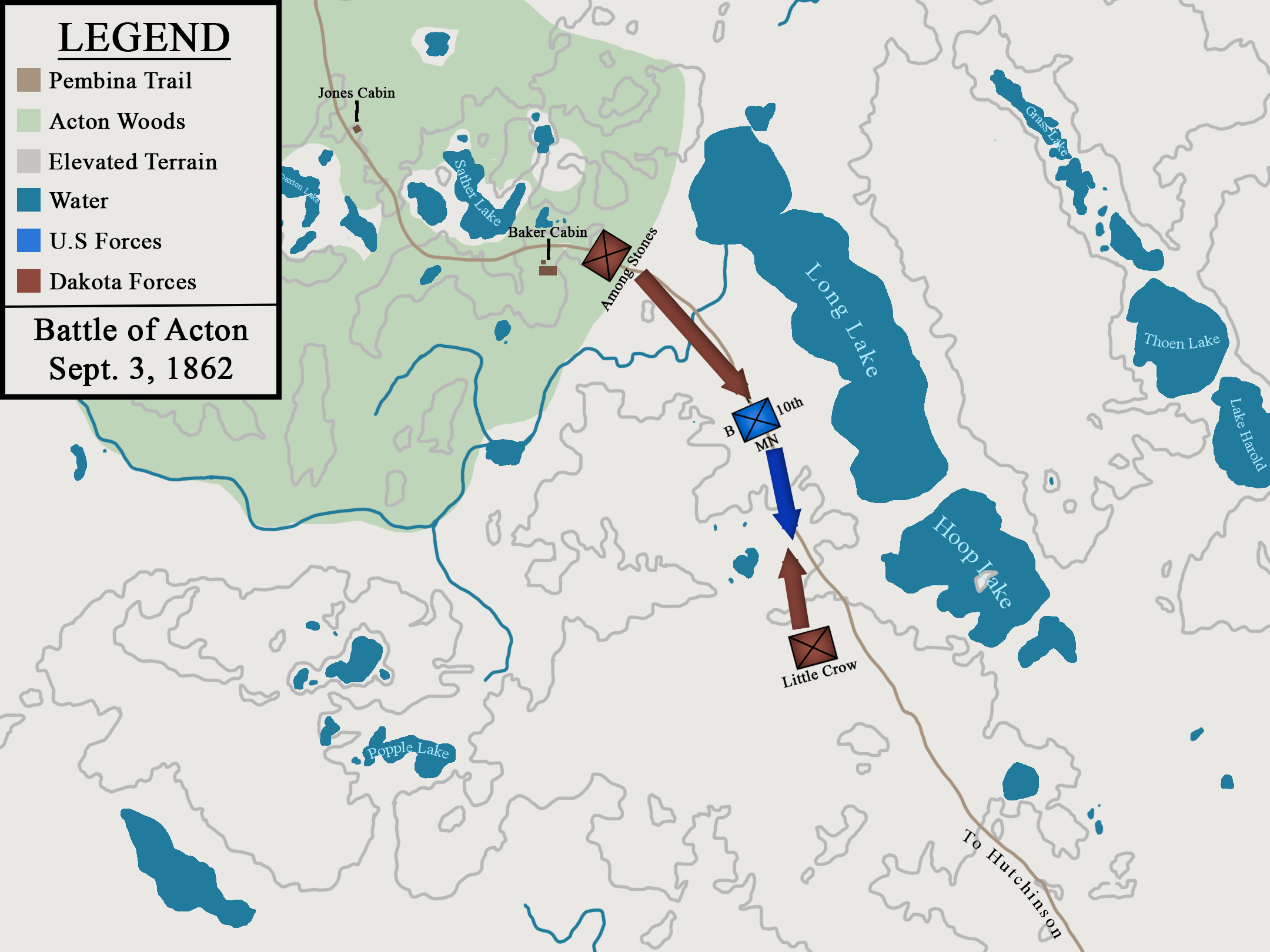
Map of the Battle of Acton

Silently issuing out several miles from Forest City, the three scouts discovered the camp at 3:00 am, which was unguarded by pickets. Capt. Strout was informed of the hostile Dakota which were camped nearby with over 100 warriors. A party of ten Dakota observed the exchange from a nearby house and hurried back to alert Little Crow that the Minnesotans had been warned. With the element of surprise lost, the Chief waited until morning to attack. Strout prepared his company to march at dawn, and stepped off heading southeast along the Pembina-Henderson trail, with 25 miles between his command and the fortified town of Hutchinson. The soldiers, mistakenly issued .62 caliber balls for their .58 caliber muskets, had to quickly whittle down 20 bullets per man before departing.

=== Battle of Acton ===
As Strout's command headed south along the west side of Long Lake, soldiers noticed the glistening of gun barrels in the distance. Strout initially believed this to be a relief column; this was not the case. It was Little Crow's smaller band of 35 men lurking in the wheatfields near Kellys Bluff. Scouts ahead of the column on Kelly's Bluff soon received gunfire and war cries of the enemy as they burst forward. While fighting on the lower ground, two soldiers were killed and several more were wounded, including scout Jesse Braham, who received a bullet to his lungs. Walker Among Stones' warriors evened the odds by rushing on the column's rear. Sergeant Michael Kenna took twenty men and charged with fixed bayonets up the bluff; giving time for the rest of the men to come up and fight from higher ground. Once all of Strout's command was in position, the only thing left to do was to decide on whether to fall back on Hutchinson or fight outnumbered on the Bluff. Some scouts, including Albert H. DeLong, a well-known local frontiersman, already left the field in an effort to bring reinforcements from Hutchinson. As his remaining forces rallied, Strout placed his men on both flanks of the wagon train. Before long, they continued under fire down the bluff toward Cedar Mills.

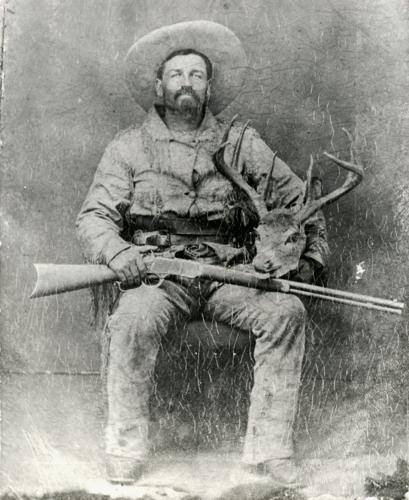
The Frontiersman Albert H. DeLong

A third man was killed and several more wounded as the company advanced down the trail. The drivers, terrified, nearly left the wounded behind. Company B soon reached Cedar Mills. There, the column was once again attacked in the front, rear, and the flanks by Dakota fighting both on foot and horseback. Food and supplies loaded in the wagons were dumped in exchange for speed. Despite their lack of training and experience, the Minnesotans fought well and maintained their formation around the wagons. The Santee-Sioux then circled around once more to the rear of the column, targeting the wagons and sowing panic among many of Strout's men. Two straggling wagons were lost, but the rest were kept out of reach as the hungry Dakota plundered them for food supplies. Strout quickly rallied his men and finally broke free of the encirclement. Reportedly, Little Crow observed the breakthrough on a fence line while bullets passed by him. The rear of the embattled company continued to be harassed in a six-hour running skirmish along the final eight miles to Hutchinson. Help would come from a column of militia under DeLong along the way.

== Aftermath ==
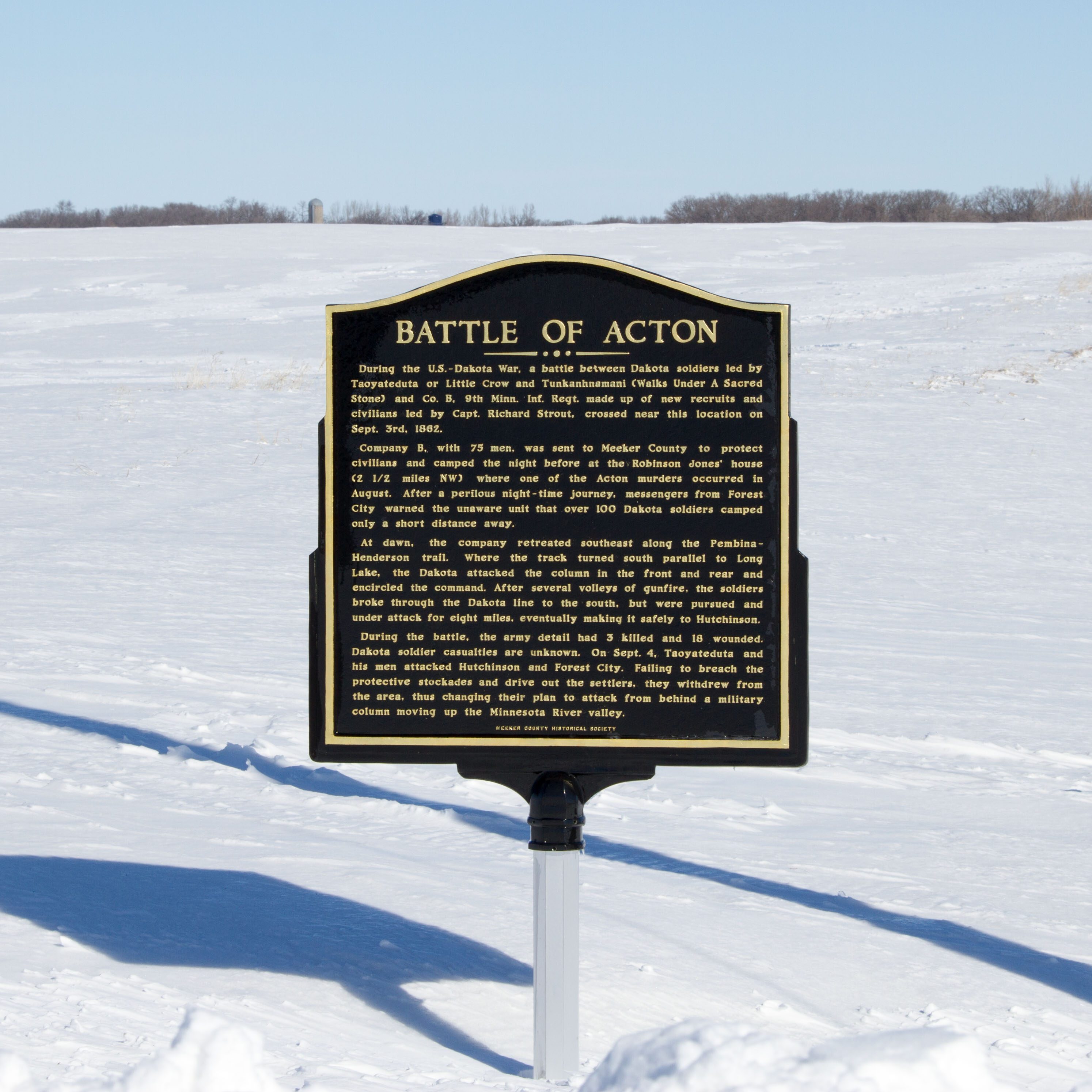
Battle of Acton Historical Marker

As his column arrived in Hutchinson, Strout immediately assumed command of the settlement's defenses. The Captain would count 3 killed and 15 wounded outright, but some estimates put the number of wounded as high as 18 or 23. At least three of the wounded men would die of wounds after the battle in the Hutchinson Hotel, then being used as a hospital. Dakota casualties are unknown. The next day, the Dakota attacked the settlements of Hutchinson and Forest City, burning and looting numerous outlying buildings but failing to breach either towns' defenses, forcing the Chief to withdraw southwest to friendlier ground. Captain Strout's company of the Tenth Minnesota would later become Company B of the Ninth Minnesota Infantry Regiment.

On November 20, 1912, at the Nicollet House in Minneapolis, a banquet was held commemorating the 50th anniversary of the battle in which ten of the aging participants reunited.

=== Soldiers killed ===
The Ninth Regiment's history lists the following as killed in action or died of wounds from the Battle of Acton: A burial party made up of soldiers from the 3rd Minnesota Infantry later found those killed in action mutilated.

- Alva Getchell (Killed in action)
- Abner C. Bennet (Died of wounds)
- Frank J. Beadle (Died of wounds)
- George W. Gideon (Killed in action)
- N. R. Weeks (Died of wounds)
- Edwin Stone (Killed in action)

=== The battlefield today ===
In 2012, the Meeker County Historical Society placed a historical marker at the intersection of County Highway 23 and 550th Avenue, approximately in the general location of where the fighting took place west of Hope Lake. It is approximately 3.5 miles south of the Acton State Monument which commemorates the massacre of August 17, 1862. Much of the rolling prairie is now home to sprawling agriculture. The Pembina-Henderson trail that ran along Long Lake no longer exists.

== Sources ==
- Carley, Kenneth (2001). The Dakota War of 1862: Minnesota's Other Civil War. Minnesota Historical Society Press. ISBN 978-0873513920.
- Anderson, Gary (2019). Massacre in Minnesota: The Dakota War of 1862, the Most Violent Ethnic Conflict in American History. University of Oklahoma Press. ISBN 978-0-8061-9199-7.
- Eggleston, Michael A. (2012). The Tenth Minnesota Volunteers, 1862-1865: A History of Action in the Sioux Uprising and the Civil War, with a Regimental Roster. Jefferson, North Carolina: McFarland. ISBN 978-0786465934.
- "Battle of Acton Historical Marker" www.hmdb.org
- "The U.S Dakota War of 1862 and the Battle of Acton" Tri County News P. 1
- Brian, (July 9, 2018) "A Real Frontiersman" Mcleod County Historical Society & Museum
- Satterlee, Marion (September 11, 1911). "Narratives of the Sioux War". Library of Congress. Archived from the original (PDF) on August 26, 2025.
