= George Carlos Whitcomb =

American military officer

Captain George Carlos Whitcomb
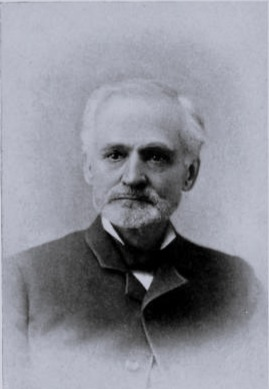
- Whitcomb c.1880-1890
- Born: December 28, 1821; Bolton, Vermont
- Died: June 18, 1901 (aged 79); Minneapolis, Minnesota
- Burial place: Kinkhead Cemetery; Alexandria, Minnesota
- Spouse: Anne Belle Felch
- Children: 3
- Military career
- Allegiance: United States of America
- Branch: Union Army
- Service years: 1863-1866
- Rank: Captain
- Units: The "Sibley Guards" militia Hatch's Minnesota Cavalry Battalion
- Commands: Company B, Hatch's Minnesota Cavalry Battalion
- Known for: Attack on Forest City
- Conflicts: Dakota War of 1862: Battle of Acton; Attack on Forest City; Attack on Hutchinson; Sioux Wars

George Carlos Whitcomb (December 28, 1821 - June 18, 1901) was a Minnesota militiaman, military officer, educator, merchant, and early prominent citizen of Meeker County, Minnesota. During the Dakota War of 1862 Whitcomb is known for raising a company of militia in Forest City, Minnesota during the Attack on Forest City by the Dakota people.

== Early life ==
George Carlos Whitcomb was born on December 28, 1821, in Cambridge, Vermont. He was the son of Robert Whitcomb and Mary Ann McKay. On November 4, 1847, Whitcomb married Ann Bell Flech. Ann was the daughter of Navy Chaplain Reverend Cheever Flech of Dedham, Massachusetts, who was aboard the USS Constitution during the USS Constitution vs HMS Guerriere. Whitcomb later moved to Potsdam, New York where he owned a storefront as a merchant. In 1856 Whitcomb and his family moved to Minnesota Territory and settled in the city of Greenleaf in southern Meeker County, Minnesota.

== Military career ==
=== Militia at Forest City ===
Although not a career officer in the military, Whitcomb rose to prominence during the Dakota War of 1862. At the outbreak of the conflict following the attack at the Lower Sioux Agency and the Acton Incident, Whitcomb quickly organized a militia of 103 local citizens from Meeker County to defend the Forest City Stockade. Whitcomb was elected as the militia's Captain and would organize the areas defenses against the Dakota. Whitcomb's militia was nicknamed the "Sibley Guards" after the previous Governor of Minnesota Henry Hastings Sibley. The unit was raised at Forest City in August, 1862 and consisted of citizens from Glencoe, Forest City, Hutchinson, and the surrounding areas. The militia guarded the surrounding settlements with its headquarters at Forest City and several outpost stockades established within the surrounding counties as far as Acton Township. Captain Richard Strout guarded western Meeker County and was in contact with Whitcomb's command at Forest City. Strout and Whitcomb's combined force scouted Acton and took part in both the Battle of Acton, as well as the Attack on Hutchinson. From September 3–4, 1862 Little Crow attacked the main stockades at Forest City and Hutchinson. Whitcomb's militia went on to serve for nearly two months during the aftermath of the conflict, primarily guarding the aforementioned settlements.

=== Hatch's Battalion ===
Whitcomb would later raise a company of United States Volunteers in the aftermath of the Dakota Uprising. This company would become the backbone of Company B of Hatch's Minnesota Cavalry Battalion. Whitcomb enlisted on July 7, 1863, at Fort Snelling and was elected as the Captain of Company B and served in the unit from 1863 to 1866. While in Hatch's Battalion Whitcomb would be in charge of several stockades located at Georgetown, Twin Lake Station, Old Crossing, Pomme de Terre, Chippewa, Alexandria, and Sauk Centre. Nearing the end of the battalion's service Whitcomb was the final "commander" of the battalion leading several remanent companies while the unit was mustering out of service. Whitcomb was mustered out of federal service in June, 1866 along with the rest of the companies.

== Later life and death ==
Following the war Whitcomb was a public trustee for the state of Minnesota, as well as Meeker County and Douglas County, Minnesota. Whitcomb was also part of the Minnesota Territorial Pioneers, a genealogical and heritage society. Whitcomb had a total of 3 children, two boys: George Felsch Whitcomb and Dr. Edward Hale Whitcomb, and one girl: Mary Elizabeth Whitcomb. Whitcomb died in Minneapolis on June 18, 1891. He is buried in Kinkhead Cemetery in Alexandria, Minnesota.
