= Lake Hope =

Lake Hope or Hope Lake can refer to:

- Lake Hope (Antarctica)
- Lake Hope (Rainy River District), Ontario
- Lake Hope (Algoma District), Ontario
- Hope Lake (Thunder Bay District), Ontario
- Hope Lake (Sudbury District), Ontario
- Hope Lake (Nordica Township, Timiskaming District), Ontario
- Hope Lake (Nipissing District), Ontario
- Hope Lake (Tudhope Township, Timiskaming District), Ontario
- Hope Lake (Cochrane District), Ontario
- Hope Lake (Kenora District), Ontario
- Hope Lake (Algoma District), Ontario
- Lake Hope (Colorado)
- Lake Hope (New Zealand)
- Lake Hope (South Australia)
- Lake Hope State Park, Ohio
- Hope Lake (Meeker County, Minnesota)
