= Attack on Forest City =

1862 attack

- Part of Dakota War of 1862, American Civil War
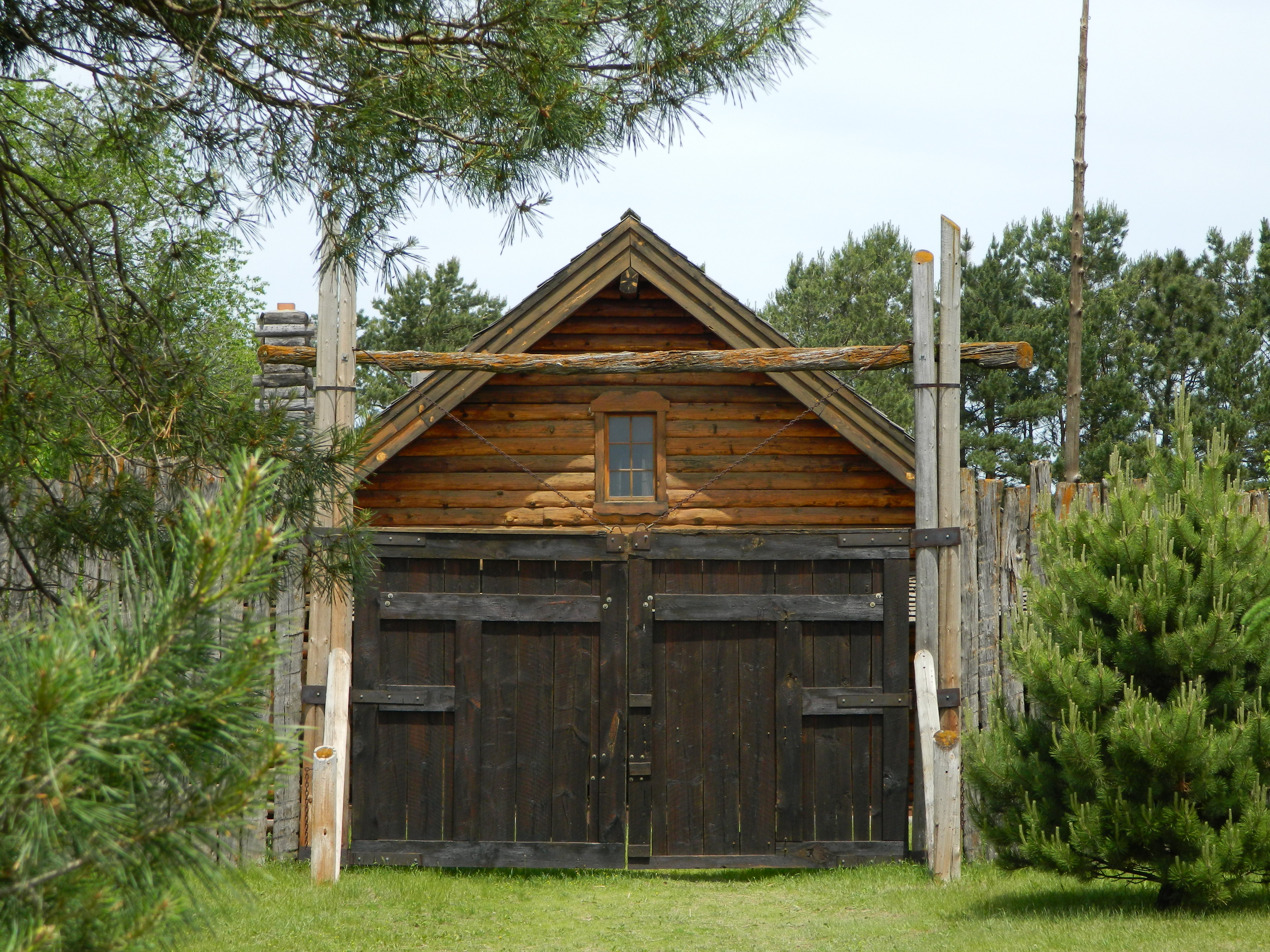
- Gate of the modern reconstruction of the Forest City Stockade
| Date | September 4, 1862 |
| Location | Forest City, Meeker County, Minnesota 45°12′23″N 94°27′59″W |
| Result | United States victory |

Belligerents
| United States | Santee-Sioux |

Commanders and leaders
| Captain George Carlos Whitcomb | Chief Little Crow |

Units involved
| Meeker County Volunteer Militia | Little Crow's Band |

Strength
| 77 | 200 |

Casualties and losses
| 1 Wounded | 3 Killed; Unknown Wounded |

The Attack on Forest City was a skirmish of the Dakota War of 1862. After fighting an engagement at Acton, Chief Little Crow attacked the stockaded town of Forest City on September 4, 1862. The attack resulted in sporadic shootouts, the burning of several buildings, and the theft of horses found around the town, but the defenders repelled any attempt to damage the fort. After the attack, Little Crow's men moved on to Hutchinson.

== Background ==
=== Attacks in the Big Woods ===
After the outbreak of the Dakota War on August 18, 1862, word quickly traveled throughout Minnesota of atrocities committed by advancing Dakota warriors. With a limited number of army units defending the frontier due to the ongoing American Civil War, many settlements took initiative in their own defense. When Little Crow advanced into the Big Woods region of Minnesota, he crossed into Meeker County and ambushed Captain Richard Strout's Company B, 10th Minnesota Infantry Regiment. His second-in-command, Walker Among Stones, joined later in the attack. The Minnesotans broke through the encirclement, however, and reached the defenses of Hutchinson in McLeod County.

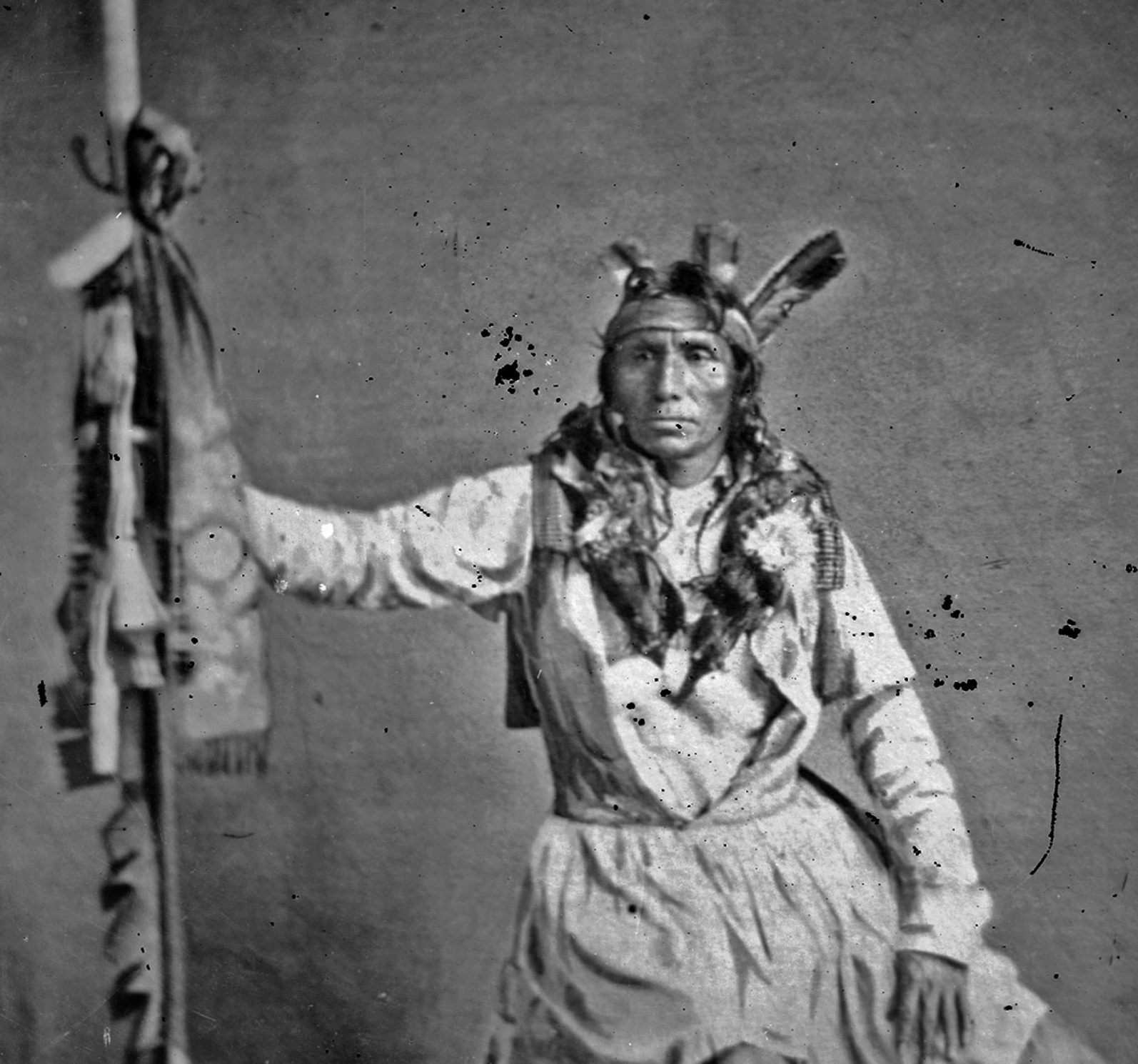
Chief Little Crow in Washington D.C, 1858

=== Situation in Forest City ===
By August 23, Forest City was nearly abandoned of its original residents: everyone besides 13 men and three women had fled. The same day, Meeker County Treasurer George Carlos Whitcomb arrived with 44 various firearms and 2,000 rounds of ammunition on the order of Governor Ramsey. The next day, Whitcomb was commissioned as a Captain in the Minnesota Volunteer Irregulars and recruited 60 men from the community (this number would climb to 77 according to the muster list). From August 24 to September 1 the men split up into teams to obtain provisions, horses, materials for a stockade, and bury the dead in the vicinity. Doing so was harrowing, as a few small skirmishes broke out between them and small parties of warriors scouting the area. Several men were killed or wounded.

=== Stockade ===
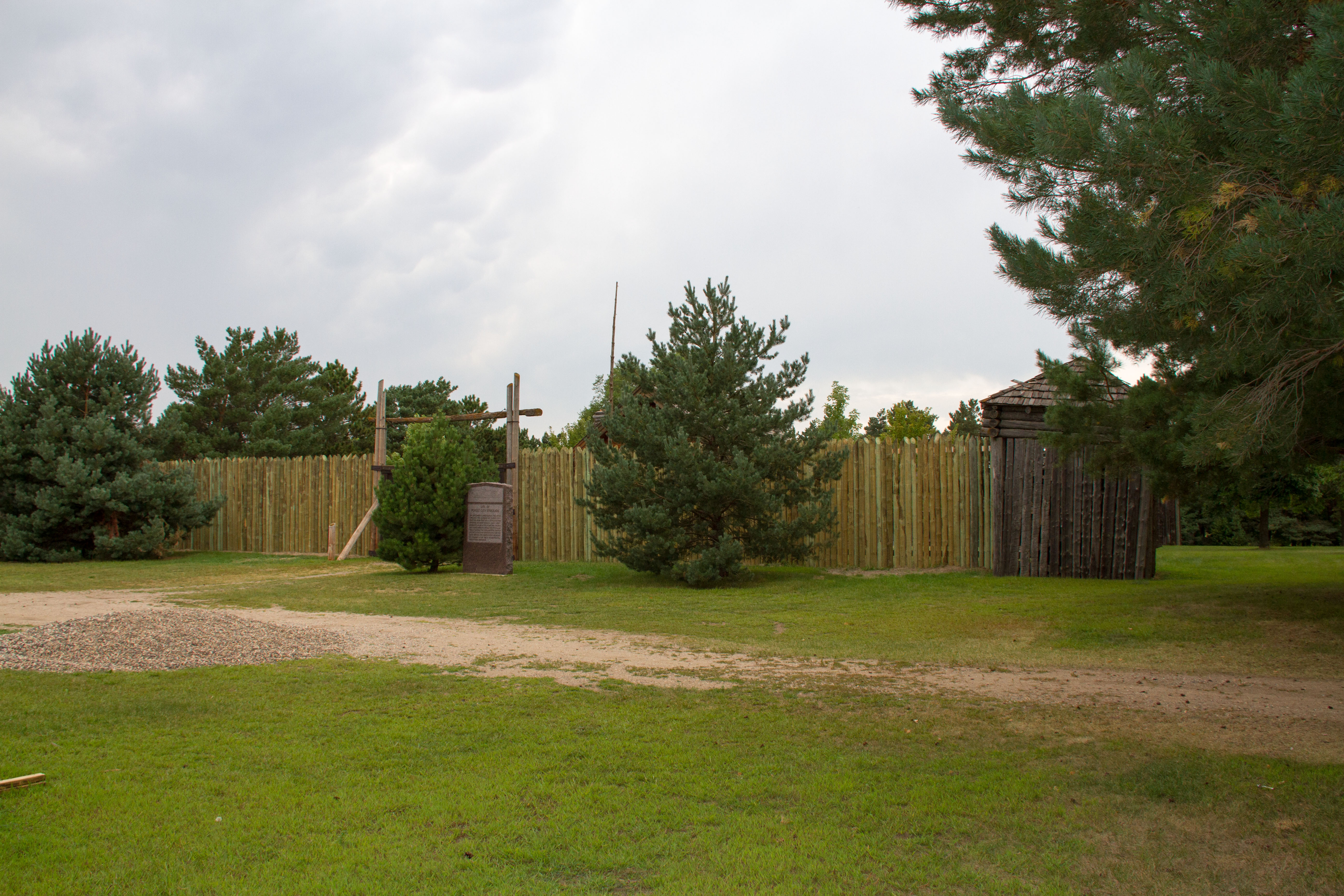
Modern Reconstruction of the Forest City Stockade

On September 2 Company B arrived at Forest City, then marched to Swede Grove where one of the skirmishes that injured one settler and killed two Dakota took place the day before. Whitcomb's men discovered that 200 Dakota warriors under the command of Little Crow camped near Acton and three men rode out on horseback to warn Strout. The Captain received the warning, but would still fight a running battle to Hutchinson. They would fight again in the cover of the stockade there on September 4. The news of a large number of Dakota warriors present and attacking an army unit ensured the quick construction of a stockade in Forest City, which was completed within 24 hours of the beginning of the Battle of Acton. The stockade was built to be 120 square-feet, allowing space for around 200 defenders and civilians.

== Attack ==
Around 3:00 am on September 4, 200 warriors were seen advancing on the town. Seeing the settlers were prepared, the Dakota resorted to setting fire to at least six homes and one barn. The warriors then took livestock and horses as some began to leave the field with their newfound plunder. The defenders in the stockade fired at the enemy, killing at least three men; only one defender was injured. At 5:00 am the warriors split off in three groups and left toward Hutchinson.

== Aftermath ==
With the attack on Forest City (and later Hutchinson) over, Little Crow's incursion had lost momentum. His bands carried off the livestock and spoils taken that day back to the southwestern part of the state. On September 23, he would be defeated by Col. Henry Hastings Sibley at the Battle of Wood Lake in modern day Yellow Medicine County, Minnesota. Whitcomb took credit for leading the defense of Forest City and the stockade continued to serve as a refuge for fleeing settlers for the remainder of the war. On September 15, Captain Petit's Company B of the 8th Minnesota Infantry Regiment arrived to defend the vicinity.

=== Forest City Stockade today ===
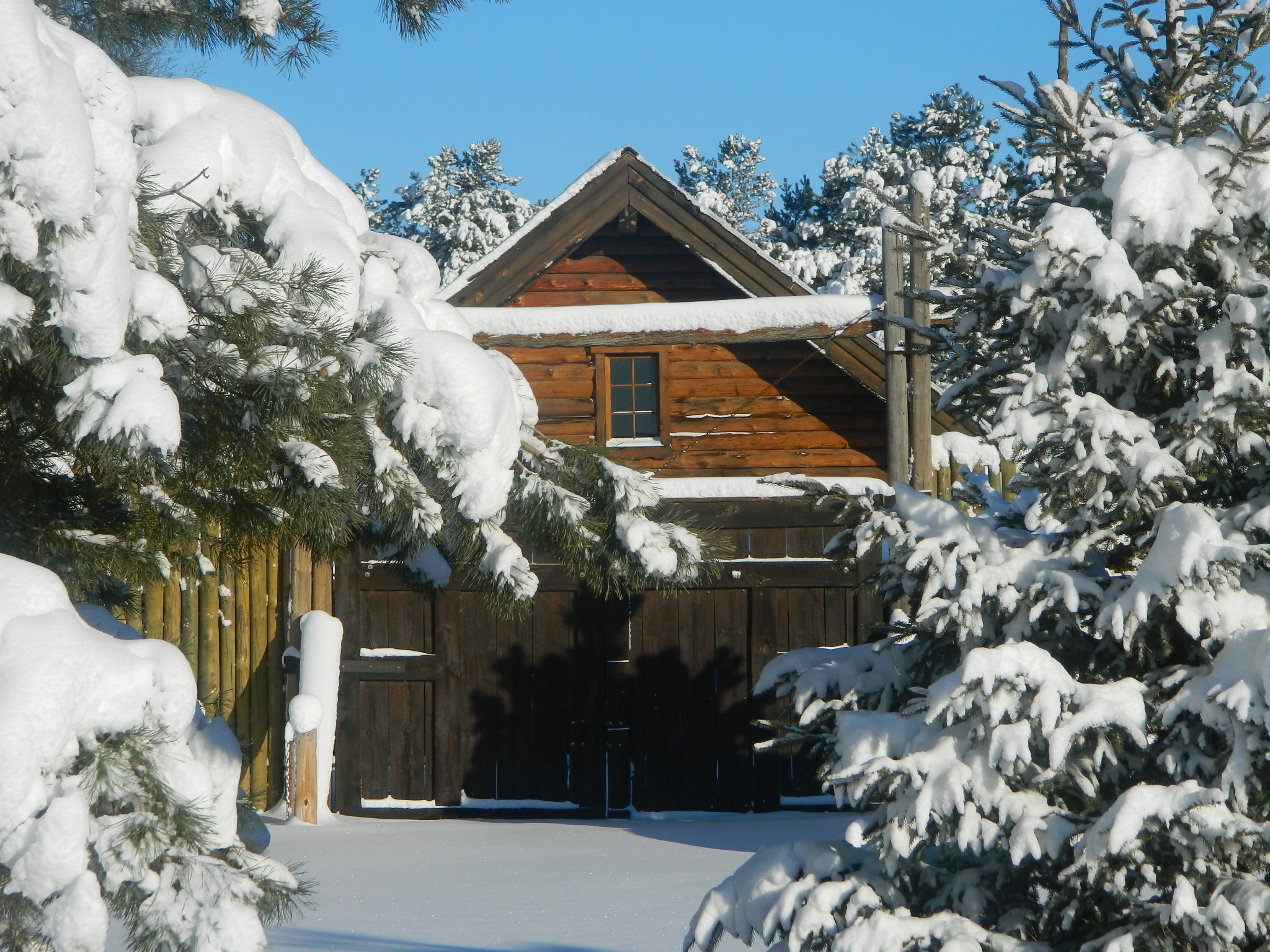
Reconstructed Forest City Stockade in Winter

A reconstruction of the Forest City stockade was built near Minnesota State Highway 24 between Litchfield and Forest City. An annual Threshing Bee takes place in August where reenactors and living historians volunteer to depict 1800s style life in local events.
