= George C. Pettie =

American politician and soldier (1828–1865)

- Pettie c. 1857–1858

Member of the Minnesota House of Representatives from the 15th District
- In office December 2, 1857 – December 6, 1859 Serving with: Smith Johnson; George L. Leonard; Hiram M. Sheetz

Personal details
- Born: George Clinton Pettie; April 23, 1828 Cherry Valley, New York, U.S.
- Died: January 19, 1865 (aged 36) Jeffersonville, Indiana, U.S.
- Resting place: New Albany National Cemetery; New Albany, Indiana, U.S.

Military service
- Years of service: 1862–1865
- Rank: Private
- Unit: Company A, 10th Minnesota Infantry Regiment
- Battles/wars: Sioux Wars; Dakota War of 1862; Sibley's 1863 Campaign; American Civil War †

George Clinton Pettie (April 23, 1828 – January 19, 1865) was an American politician and soldier who served a single term in the Minnesota House of Representatives.

== Early life ==
Pettie was born on April 23, 1828 in New York.^{:352} Pettie moved to Minnesota Territory in the 1850's, by 1857 Pettie was living in Aurora Township in Steele County, Minnesota.^{:47}

== Politics ==
Pettie began his political career in September of 1856 when he was selected to serve as a delegate for the Minnesota Territory's 1856 Republican convention, representing Steele County in the 10th council district alongside delegates H.M. Sheets, A. Clark, P. Sanford, and M.S. Green.

Pettie later campaigned in 1857 for a seat in Minnesota's 15th House district in the Minnesota House of Representatives. At the time the district included Steele County and Waseca County. Pettie won the October 13, 1857 election and would serve in the 1st Minnesota Legislature, a protracted session, from December 2, 1857, to December 6, 1859. During his term Pettie was a member of the rules and joint rules committee.

Pettie later ran unsuccessfully for the office of county treasurer for Steele County on October 8, 1861, losing to candidate W. W. Finch.^{:71} Pettie also served on the county board of Steele County in 1861.^{:32}

== Military service and death ==
During the American Civil War Pettie enlisted into the Union Army on August 12, 1862 and was enrolled into the ranks of Company A of the 10th Minnesota Infantry Regiment as a Private. The 10th Minnesota fought in the Dakota War of 1862, as well as in Sibley's 1863 Campaign, before being sent to the south to fight the Confederate States of America.

Pettie died on January 19, 1865 in Jeffersonville, Indiana. Pettie is buried in the New Albany National Cemetery in Jeffersonville.
