= Josiah F. Marsh =

Canadian-American lawyer, judge, and soldier

Josiah Fay Marsh
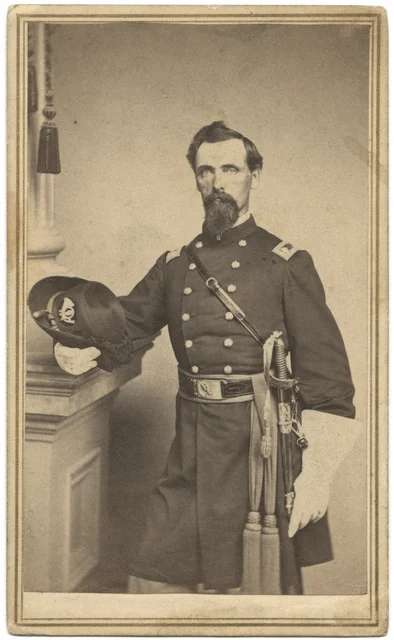
- Marsh c.1865

Judge of the Fillmore County Probate Court
- In office January 4, 1860 – October 10, 1862

Personal details
- Born: 1825 Whitby, Ontario; Upper Canada
- Died: November 8, 1886 (age 60-61) Chicago, Illinois
- Resting place: Rosehill Cemetery; Chicago, Illinois
- Spouse(s): Mary M. Marsh; Frances "Fanny" Greene
- Children: 2
- Occupation: Lawyer; Judge
- Profession: Lawyer

Military service
- Allegiance: United States of America
- Branch/service: (United States) Union Army
- Years of service: 1862-1865
- Rank: Colonel
- Unit: Company E, 7th Minnesota Infantry Regiment; 9th Minnesota Infantry Regiment
- Commands: 9th Minnesota Infantry Regiment
- Battles/wars: Dakota War of 1862; American Civil War

Josiah Fay Marsh (c.1825 - November 8, 1886) was a Canadian American lawyer, judge, military officer, and early settler of Fillmore County, Minnesota. Marsh served as the Colonel of the 9th Minnesota Infantry Regiment after the death of the regiment's original commander, Colonel Alexander Wilkin, following the Battle of Tupelo.

== Early life ==
Josiah Fay Marsh was born in 1825 in Whitby, Ontario, in Upper Canada, he was the son of Baptist Reverend Israel Marsh (1797–1855) of Quebec, and Eliza Bowen (1796–1858). Marsh's grandfather was Baptist Reverend William Marsh (1757–1843), a United Empire Loyalist from Vermont who fled to the province of Quebec (later Upper Canada) during the American Revolutionary War. Both Marsh's father Israel and grandfather William were two of the most prominent figures behind the founding of the Whitby Baptist Church.

Around 1856 Marsh moved to Minnesota Territory and erected a home in Fillmore County near Elliota, Minnesota, by 1860. While living in Elliota, Marsh practiced law as a local lawyer in the nearby city of Preston, Minnesota. Marsh was a member of the Fillmore County Bar Association with local Minnesota Legislature member Reuben Wells as its president and chair. Marsh served as the Probate Judge of Fillmore county from January 4, 1860, until his resignation October 10, 1862 due to military service.

== Military service ==
At the outbreak of the Dakota War of 1862 Marsh organized Company E of the 7th Minnesota Infantry Regiment with Thomas G. Hall selected as his 1st Lieutenant on August 22, 1862, in Preston, Minnesota. Marsh was instead transferred to the 9th Minnesota Infantry Regiment on September 25, 1862, to protect the Minnesota frontier during the immediate aftermath of the conflict. Marsh was immediately appointed as the Lieutenant Colonel of the regiment by the regiment's Colonel Alexander Wilkin, a veteran of the 1st Minnesota Infantry Regiment. Marsh fought with the rest of the regiment in the Western theater of the American Civil War.

Marsh distinguished himself at the Battle of Brice's Cross Roads in June, 1864 where he directed the 9th Minnesota's rear-guard in a drawn-out skirmish that prevented Confederate General Nathan Bedford Forrest from capturing even more men than he did later in the battle. Marsh was later promoted to the rank of Colonel on July 27, 1864, after the death of Wilkin on July 14, 1864, during the Battle of Tupelo. According to the book Minnesota in the Civil War by Minnesota Historical Society historian Kenneth Carley, Wilkin was the highest-ranking officer from Minnesota who was killed in action.

For the remainder of the war Marsh commanded the 9th Minnesota at during Price's Missouri Expedition at the Battle of Westport, the Battle of Nashville, the Battle of Spanish Fort, and the Battle of Fort Blakeley. Marsh and the 9th Minnesota were later used to occupy Mobile, Alabama during the immediate postwar era. Marsh mustered out with the rest of the regiment on August 24, 1865.

== Later life ==
Following the war Marsh moved to Dubuque County, Iowa in 1870 and later lived in Des Moines, Iowa, in 1880. Marsh had two wives: Mary M. Marsh (1824–1851) and Frances "Fanny" Greene (1833–1915). He had one son and three daughters. Marsh died in Chicago on November 8, 1886. He is buried in the Rosehill Cemetery in Chicago.
