= Indian Ghost Hill =

Natural American landmark

Coordinates: 45°13′13″N 94°26′26.3″W

Indian Ghost Hill is a hill in Meeker County, Minnesota, United States, next to Forest City. The Crow River runs through Forest City and is adjacent to Indian Ghost Hill.

The name comes from an unusual optical illusion which makes it seem that a car with the handbrake off begins to roll up the hill. Local legend had it that the ghosts of Indian children are pushing the cars.
