= 9th Minnesota Infantry Regiment =

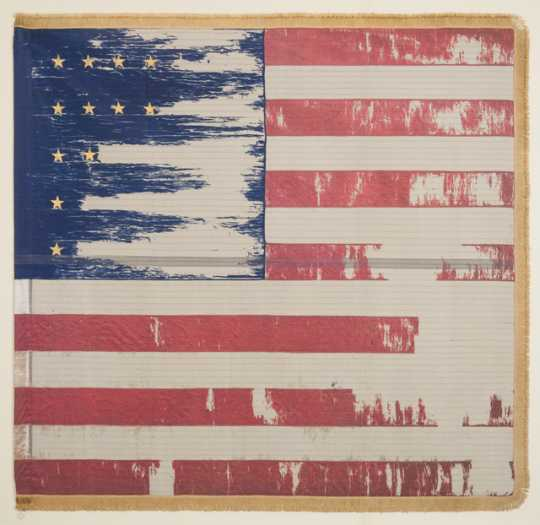
- 9th Minnesota Infantry Regiment National Flag
- Active: August 15, 1862, to August 24, 1865
- Country: United States
- Allegiance: Union
- Branch: Infantry
- Engagements: American Civil War: Dakota War of 1862; Battle of Acton; Siege of Fort Abercrombie; Attack on Hutchinson; Battle of Wood Lake; Forrest's Defense of Mississippi; Battle of Brice's Crossroads; Battle of Tupelo; Price's Missouri Expedition; Battle of Westport; Franklin-Nashville Campaign; Battle of Nashville; Mobile Campaign; Battle of Spanish Fort; Battle of Fort Blakeley

Commanders
- Notable commanders: Alexander Wilkin; Josiah F. Marsh

The 9th Minnesota Infantry Regiment was a Minnesota USV infantry regiment that served in the Union Army in the Western Theater of the American Civil War.

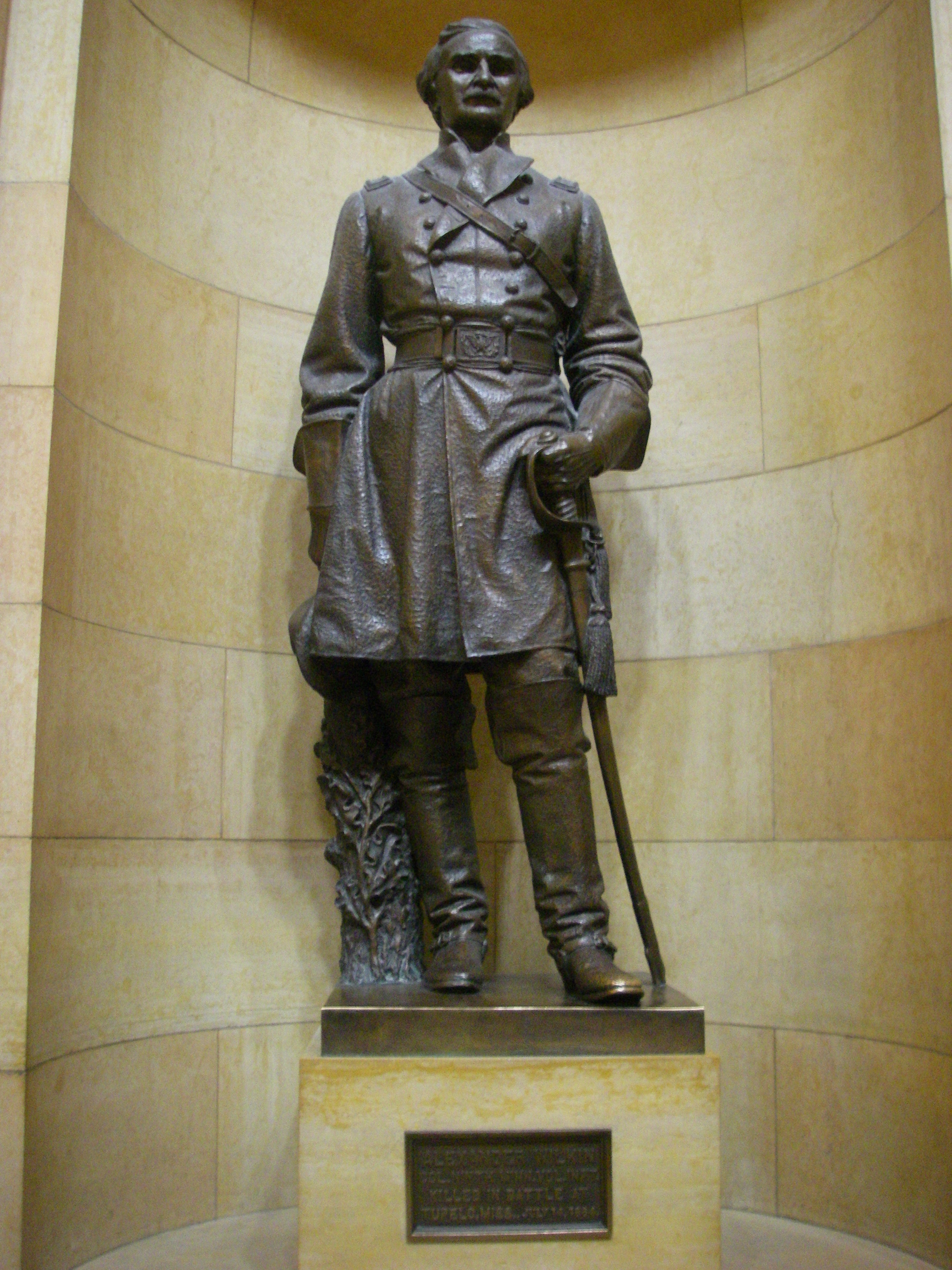
Col. Alexander Wilkin killed at the Battle at Tupelo, Mississippi. July 14, 1864. Statue by John K. Daniels, 1910.

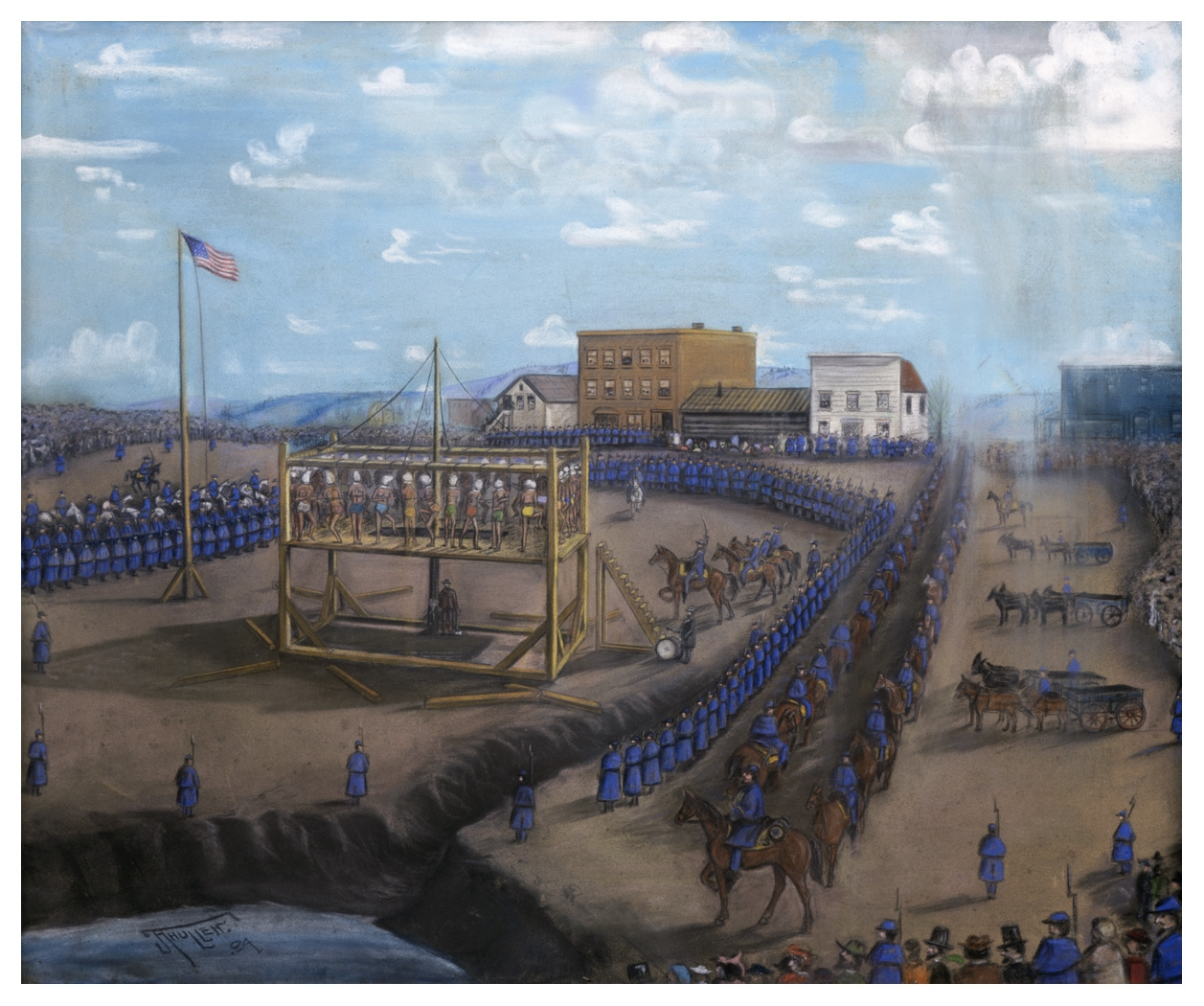
Execution of the 38 Sioux Warriors at Mankato, Minnesota, guarded by companies of the 9th and 10th Minnesota Regiments

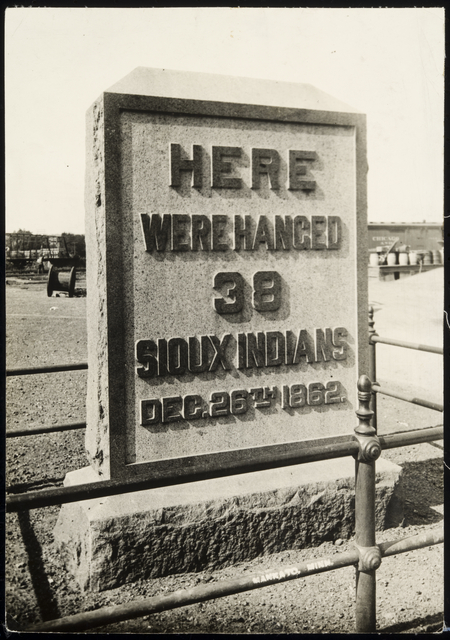
Mankato hanging monument erected for 50th anniversary and removed in 1971.

== Service ==
The 9th Minnesota Infantry Regiment was organized into service at Camp Release, Hutchinson, Glencoe, Fort Ridgely, Fort Snelling and St. Peter, Minnesota, between August 15 and October 31, 1862. The companies were individually mustered into Federal service at Camp Release in October.

- A Co. Joined the 6th Minnesota on August 25 to relieve besieged Fort Ridgely. A Company saw action against the Sioux at the Battle of Birch Coulee and the Battle of Wood Lake. They mustered into Federal service on October 2. They saw action again at the Big Mound, Buffalo Lake and the Battle of Stony Lake.
- B Co. saw action at Glencoe on 3 September and defended Hutchinson 3–4 September 1862.
- C Co. joined Sibley's forces at New Ulm and saw action at Wood Lake. Mustered into Federal service on 5 October.
- D, E, and H companies were the guard at the hangings of the 38 Sioux in Mankato.
- F Co. was organized at Fort Snelling and posted to Fort Ridgely for a year. Was mustered in Federal service in September 1862.
- G Co. was organized at St. Cloud and posted north at Fort Abercrombie for a year. The company was composed of roughly equal numbers of German-speaking immigrants from Stearns County and Ojibwe and French Canadians from the multi-ethnic fur trade community of Crow Wing.
- I Co. was at Glencoe, St. Peter, and Fort Ridgely until 1863. Mustered in Federal service on 12 October.
- K Co. was organized at Fort Snelling and posted to South Bend outside Mankato and then to New Ulm and Madelia.

In September 1863 the regiment was reorganized as a unit and sent south to St. Louis Missouri, where it was posted to the Department of Missouri. May 1864 the 9th Minnesota was attached to the 2nd Brigade, 1st Division, 16th Army Corps, Dept. of the Tennessee, to December 1864. At that time they were made part of the 2nd Brigade, 1st Division (Detachment), Army of the Tennessee, Dept. of the Cumberland. From February, until August 1865. the regiment was part of the 2nd Brigade, 1st Division, 16th Army Corps (New), Military Division West Mississippi.

In August the regiment was sent back to St. Paul for discharge.

== Casualties ==
The 9th Minnesota Infantry suffered 6 officers and 41 enlisted men killed in action or who later died of their wounds, plus another 3 officers and 224 enlisted men who died of disease, for a total of 274 fatalities.

List of 9th Minn. dead at Andersonville Prison.

== Colonels ==
- Colonel Alexander Wilkin – August 24, 1862, to July 14, 1864.
- Colonel Josiah F. Marsh – July 27, 1864, to August 19, 1865.

== See also ==
- List of Minnesota Civil War Units
- 10th Minnesota Infantry Regiment
