= Forest City Stockade =

Coordinates: 45°11′44″N 94°27′46″W

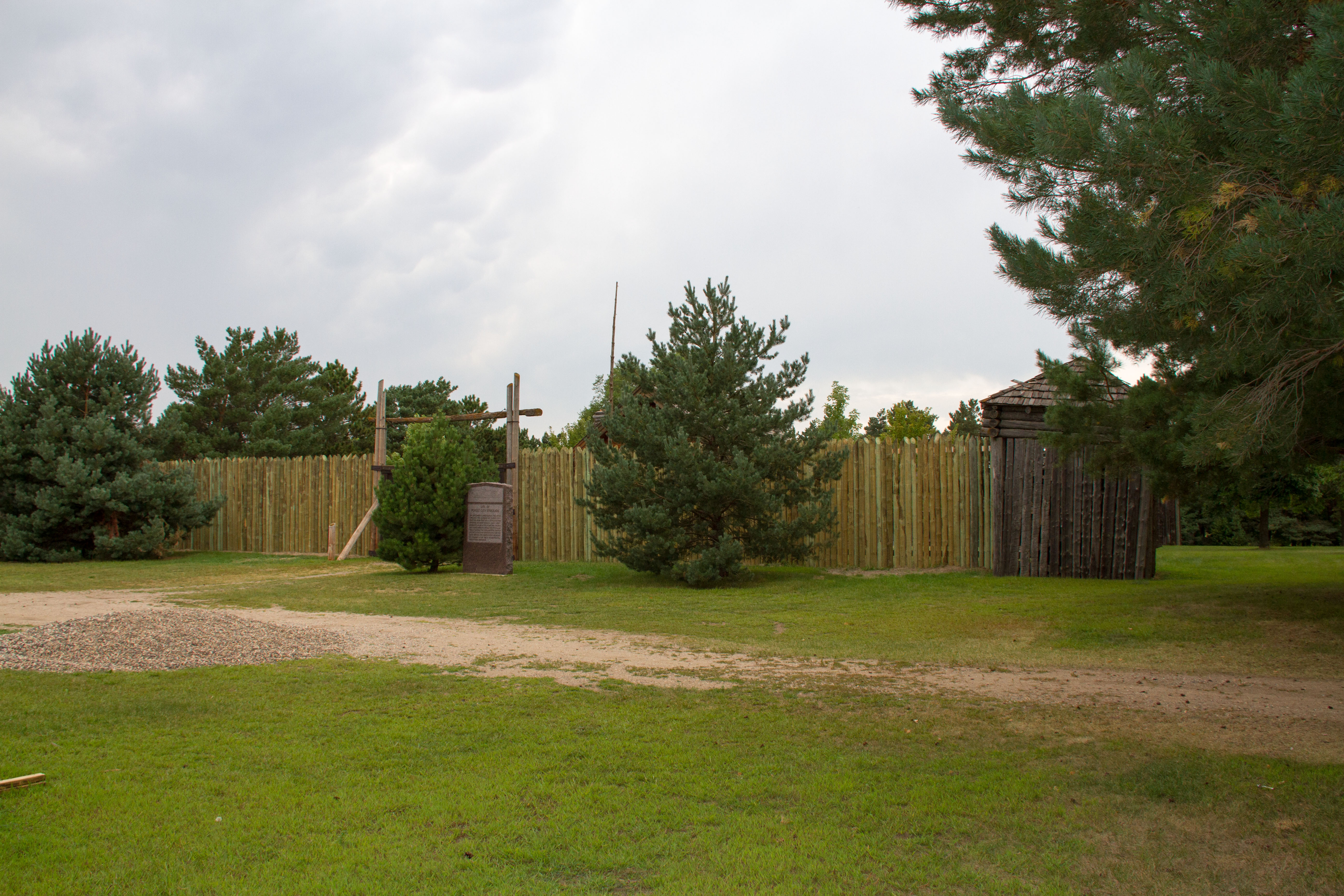

The Forest City Stockade was built in central Minnesota to defend settlers in the area from Indian attacks. It became famous during the Dakota War of 1862, when it was besieged by the Dakota as part of Little Crow's attack on Forest City. In the 21st century, the rebuilt stockade functions as a tourist attraction and memorial to the battle. Visitors to the site can visit a rebuilt stockade and see volunteers in 19th-century dress illustrate period life and activities. A threshing bee takes place across the road in August. The site of the stockade is between Litchfield and Forest City near Minnesota State Highway 24.

== 1862 Dakota War ==
The Forest City Stockade was built September 3, 1862 by planting a double row of logs on end, three feet into the ground and ten feet protruding out, approximately 120 feet square.

The following day, 200 Sioux appeared around 3am, and finding the stockade, resorted to burning, random shooting and stealing horses which had not been secured yet. Ten to Twelve Indians were reportedly killed, and one soldier injured, one barn and six houses belonging to Wm Richardson, Milton Gorton, James P. Howlett, Dudley Taylor, A. B. Hoyt, William Richards, and A. C Smith burned.

== List of Defenders ==
The following is a list of those who defended the Forest City Stockade in September 1862 who were mustered in on August 24, 1862 (names noted w/*) and known as the 'Meeker County Volunteers' by August 28, 1862. George Carlos Whitcomb claimed to be captain of the group by the captains commission issued by Colonel H. H. Sibley to send 75 Springfield muskets with him (31 were dropped off in Hutchinson, who too were in dire need.)

- ANGIER, HENDERSON M
- ATKINSON, J. B. - Sheriff & County Commissioner - never left Forest City -Elected 1st Lieutenant
- BEHRMANN, H.
- BRADSHAW, J. H.
- BRANHAM, JESSIE V. JR - suggested Forest City stockade construction - scout with Captain Strout was wounded near Acton on September 3
- BRANHAM, JESSIE V. SR. - rode 100 miles to get military aid in Sioux uprising.
- BRANHAM, WILLIAM H/A - elected 1st Sergeant - had guard duty night of attack - wounded during counterattack on Forest City
- CASWELL, WILLIAM
- CHAPIN, D.
- CHAPIN, E. A. - county commissioner
- COBB, JESSE F. - forage detail
- CONDON, PATRICK
- DANIELSON, NELS - wounded - secured north side during attack
- DART, CHANCEY - guard duty the night of attack and gave warning shot
- DOUGHERTY, THOMAS
- GARRISON, J. B.
- GIBBONS, ELI
- GIBBONS, OLIVER - forage detail
- GORTON, MILTON - never left Forest City
- GOULD, FREEMAN L/G - elected 4th Sergeant
- GRAYSON, THOMAS - never left Forest City
- HAMILTON, ANDREW
- HANSON, PETER E
- HARVEY, JAMES M - county auditor - never left Forest City - Elected 5th Sergeant - Quarter Master Commission on August 28 - hero during Indian outbreak
- HEATH, A. F. - elected 1st Corporal
- HEATH, J.
- HILL, H. J. - elected 2nd Corporal
- HOLBROOK, D. M.
- HOWE, H. S. - elected 2nd Sergeant
- HOYT, AZRO B/ALONZ B - elected 8th Sergeant
- HUTCHINS, SAMUEL - elected 4th Corporal
- JEWETT, T C (Carlos/Charles) - Register of Deeds - never Left Forest City - elected 3rd Corporal
- JOHNSON, HENRY
- JOHNSON, W.
- KRUGER, CHARLES
- KRUGER, HERMAN
- LANG, JAMES B.
- LARSON, ANDREW
- LUTONS, H.
- MAYBEE, CHARLES D.
- MCGRAW, CORNELIUS
- MCGRAW, DANIEL - elected 3rd Sergeant
- MCGRAW, MICHAEL (JR)
- MERRILL, M. D./NEHEMIAH D.
- MICKELSON, HOVER
- MORRILL, N. D. (NEHEMIAH)
- MOUSLEY, ALFRED
- NELSON, ANDREW - guard duty the night of attack
- NELSON, JAMES H.
- OLSON, ASLOG - secured north side of stockade during attack - wounded during counterattack
- OLSON, HALGA(R)
- PAGE, GEO. R.
- PAYSON, C. E.
- RAGAN, THOMAS
- RALSTON, R. B. - elected 6th Corporal
- REEF, EMANUEL M - (Gottlip?) - provisions guard
- ROGERS, JEROME
- SCHULTZ, RUDOLPH
- SHOLES, GEORGE S, SR - never left Forest City
- SKINNER, THOMAS H - never left Forest City
- SMITH, ABNER COMSTOCK - Judge of Probate - never left Forest City
- SMITH, HENRY L - never Left Forest City - guard duty the night of attack - fired first return shot at the Indians
- SMITH, LORY (Louis?)
- SPERRY, ALBERT C
- STANTON, JUDSON A - Clerk Of Court - never Left Forest City - forage detail
- STEVENS, HAMLET - never Left Forest City - elected 2nd Lieutenant - guard duty the night of attack and gave warning shot
- STEVENS, SYLVESTER - never Left Forest City - guard duty the night of attack
- SWOUTART, E.
- THOMAS, JOSEPH C.
- TODD, O. B.
- TORNBORN, NELS
- TOWLER, WM - never left Forest City - provisions guard
- WAGGONER, G W
- WHITCOMB, GEORGE C - Treasurer of Meeker Co. 1862, rode from Forest City stockade to Carver & took a boat to St Paul to sound the alarm of the attack Aug 22–23, before Jessie Branham did the same thing.
- WHITE, N. H. - elected 7th Sergeant
- WHITE, S. W.
- WILCOX, WILLIAM H
