= Attack on Hutchinson =

1862 attack

- Part of Dakota War of 1862, American Civil War
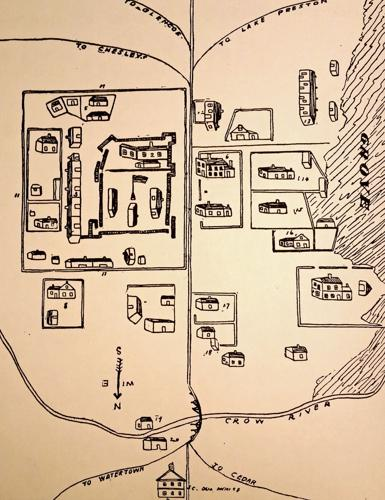
- Map of the City of Hutchinson, 1862
Date	September 4, 1862
Location	Hutchinson, Minnesota, McLeod County, Minnesota 44°53′20″N 94°22′30″W
Result	See Aftermath

Belligerents
United States	Santee-Sioux

Commanders and leaders
Captain Richard Strout; William W. Pendergast	Chief Little Crow

Units involved
Company B, 10th Minnesota Infantry Regiment; Hutchinson Home Guard	Little Crow's Band

Strength
Unknown	200

Casualties and losses
32 Killed (including non-combatants); 1 Combatant Wounded; 1 Captured	4 Killed; 3–15 Wounded

The Attack on Hutchinson occurred on September 4, 1862, during the Dakota War of 1862 as a part of Chief Little Crow's incursion into the Big Woods area of Minnesota. On September 3, Little Crow encountered Captain Strout's Company B, 10th Minnesota Infantry Regiment near Acton and chased it to the stockade of the town of Hutchinson. On September 4 Little Crow attacked with 200 warriors and destroyed most of the buildings outside of the stockade. Small firefights broke out between the Hutchinson Home Guard and Sioux warriors, but the Dakota failed to breach the town's defenses. Little Crow's men subsequently retreated, bringing as much loot as they could carry.

== Background ==
=== Fortification of Hutchinson ===
Word of the attack at the Lower Sioux Agency on August 18 had spread quickly throughout Minnesota, frontier settlements and counties drafted militia and constructed fortifications in response. In the central area of the state, towns such as Hutchinson, Forest City, St. Cloud, and Glencoe rapidly improvised defenses.

Construction of the Hutchinson stockade began immediately upon the organization of the town's Home Guard. The 100-square-foot stockade was built in what is now Library Square, and all the log houses in the city were dismantled to construct it. These were still not enough to complete the stockade, so teams of civilians were sent to bring more from the nearby woods. A trench was dug around the stockade about 100 feet wide and three feet deep and hardened with sod hauled in by teams of farmers. Three-inch holes were cut four feet apart in the walls for defenders to fire through. Finally, a northeast and southeast gate were installed with protruding fortifications to protect them.

While new volunteer army units dispatched from Fort Snelling were marching off to reinforce the frontier in central Minnesota, a band of Dakota under Chief Little Crow headed for the Big Woods area while Gray Bird, Mankato and Big Eagle continued their campaign along the Minnesota River.

=== Little Crow in the Big Woods ===
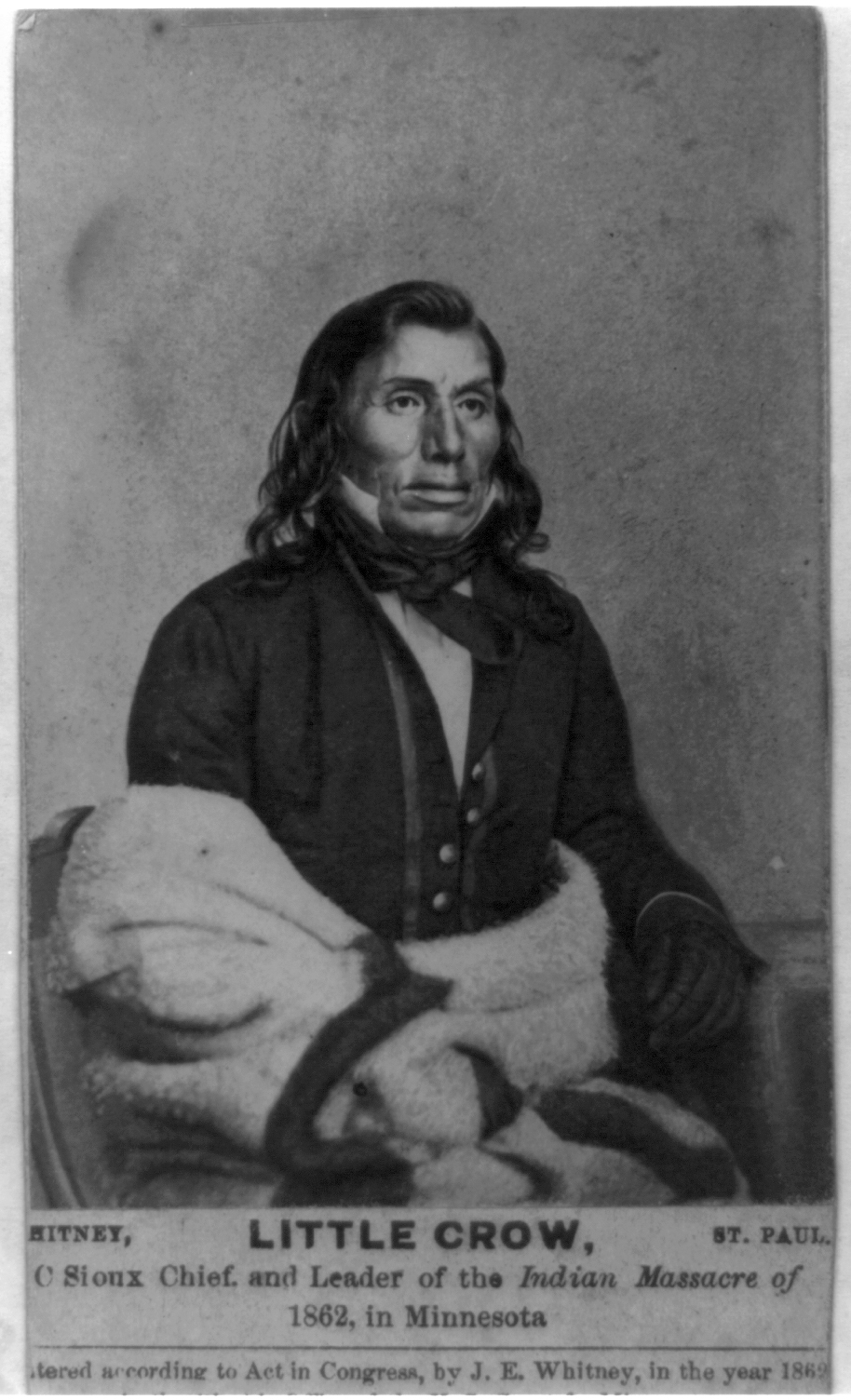
Chief Little Crow in 1862

By September 2, Little Crow had moved north out of the Minnesota River Valley and camped near the town of Acton, where the murders that began the Dakota Uprising has occurred on August 17. Nearby was 55-64 men of the 10th Minnesota Infantry Regiment under Captain Richard Strout. Little Crow and his subordinate, Walker Among Stones, attacked the 10th Minnesota in two groups shortly after they marched off at dawn on September 3, but failed to overwhelm them. After breaking through the Dakota line, Strout put up a fighting retreat to the city of Hutchinson where his command would take shelter in the stockade.

== Battle ==
=== Little Crow Arrives ===
Chief Little Crow set off from Cedar Mills at dawn on September 4 and reached the outskirts of Hutchinson around 9:00 am. At the same time, the Home Guard were bringing back their pickets to the stockade as many of the men were determined to continue the harvest. When Little Crow deployed an advance guard to approach the town, one farmer named Heller was encountered and struck in the thigh by a Dakota bullet. As the warriors came in view of the Stockade and the men defending it, they refrained from further advance and waited on the rest of their number. The Dakota planned to attack the fort from the North and placed an unknown number of men on the road to Glencoe, where they expected to block a retreat by the settlers and militia.

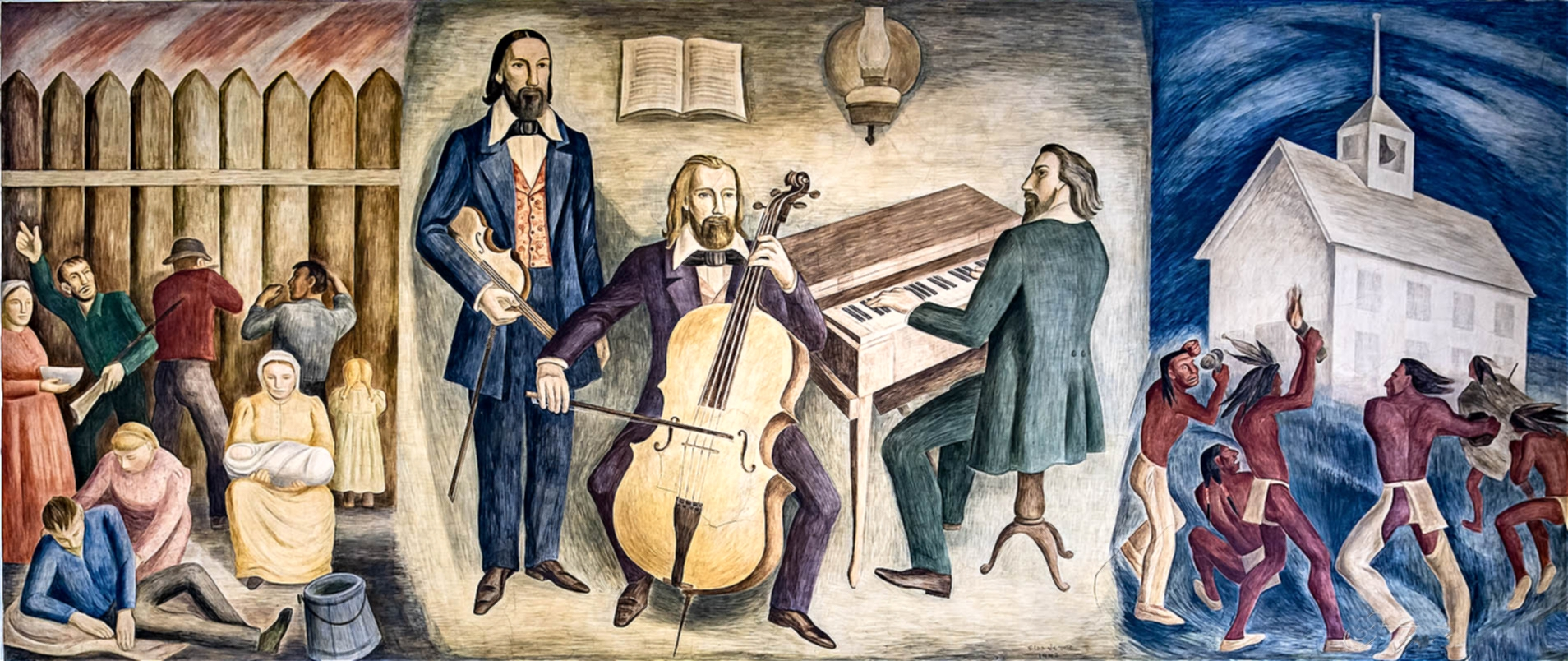
The Hutchinson Singers, by Elsa Jemne, 1941. The first image depicts militia and refugees inside the Stockade. The third image depicts the burning of the Hutchinson Schoolhouse.

=== The Attack ===
As the warriors began their encirclement, 13 or 15 men under Capt. Harrington from the Stockade ran out brandishing their arms to fight the larger force head on; three other groups did so toward the south, north and east. Frightened settlers made their way into the shelter of the stockade; some were killed and scalped before they could reach safety. Anna Fallon, seven years old at the time, recounted her experience in 1953:

I can still see the Indians coming through the brush with their faces and bodies painted all colors. My mother and I were in a cabin outside the stockade with my brother, Patsy, who needed better shelter than the stockade afforded as he was very sick. The Indians made a surprise attack and mother in her hoop skirts took Patsy in her arms and ran along the stockade wall for the gate. I will never forget how the arrows whanged into the stockade wall and vibrated there as we passed.

The initiative of the Hutchinson Guards frustrated Captain Strout, who ordered them back, but they would not listen. Most others, however, were content with the safety of the defenses. Fighting the Dakota individually proved harrowing as Harrington's men split up to fire from different positions; including the exposed Hotel. Little Crow's men completed their encirclement and burned all other buildings to the ground, including the Hutchinson Academy and the Steam Sawmill. The warriors sent back small teams with the loot and plunder they took before burning them, capturing around 100 horses and oxen. One horse was almost recaptured by a defender, but nearby warriors put down enough suppressing fire to prevent it. A small band of 25 warriors attempted to set fire to the last few buildings on the west side of the Stockade, but concealed defenders drove them back with gunfire. Om-ne-sha (Red Trail) is said to have called out: “O come out of your fort on the open ground and fight like men!”. Of course, the defenders were more than content with remaining in the fort and drove off any further attempts to set the buildings on fire. At some point in the fight, some men eventually sallied out to retrieve items from a store owned by a Mr. Sumner as he offered free pairs of boots for each man who could recover any goods. Suddenly, another group of men could be seen approaching, a young George Covey recalled the following:

About three in the afternoon, we could see a band of men coming and thought it was more Indians. Women were pulling out handfuls of hair and screaming, the men were praying and cursing, but as the band came closer, we saw they were soldiers (from Glencoe). By that time there were no Indians around. The soldiers divided up into squads and went out looking for people that had not come into the stockade. They brought in 32 dead, including the neighbor’s wife and boy that lived across the road from our house. The boy was a playmate. My father took me to see them and it was surely awful.

=== Relief Column ===
Earlier, as the attack occurred and the town burned, the smoke could be seen by the units camped around Lake Addie and Glencoe. Immediately, they marched to relieve the beleaguered town. The relief column was sighted at around 4:00 pm by Little Crow's scouts. Satisfied with their plunder, the Dakota decided to withdraw with what they captured.

The column was composed of the following units:

- Lt. Joseph Weinman's 50 men of Company H, 9th Minnesota Infantry Regiment marching from Lake Addie
- Capt. I. Davis Weinman's 25 men of the Goodhue County Mounted Rangers marching from Glencoe

== Aftermath ==
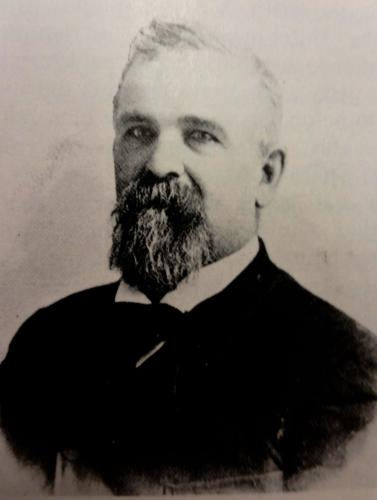
William Wirt Pendergast, one of the key figures in the founding of Hutchinson and its development. His schoolhouse and home were destroyed during the attack on September 4, 1862.

Due to the nature of the attack, neither side suffered heavily. Thanks to the concealment provided, the stockade's garrison suffered no fatalities, though one man was wounded. However, outside of the fortifications several men were killed and several more were wounded. George Covey recounted that 32 civilian and soldier dead were brought in by the relief column. The hotel had to be turned into a small hospital to treat the other wounded. Little is known about casualties suffered by the Dakota, but some say three are known to have been wounded with one of them (the son-in-law of Medicine Bottle) dying of his wounds several days later. William W. Pendergast however, claims that the Dakota admitted 4 killed and 15 wounded at Hutchinson. Lastly, at least 100 of much needed horses and oxen were now in Dakota hands.

The attack was a success for Little Crow in the sense that his men had secured many spoils. Most of the town had been burned aside from the Stockade and one home. On the other hand, the defenders held the stockade, but could not save the rest of the town. After the attack, he took with him what spoils he could and led his command back to Southwestern Minnesota to rejoin the other bands.

== Sources ==
- Carley, Kenneth (2001). The Dakota War of 1862: Minnesota's Other Civil War. Minnesota Historical Society Press ISBN 978-0873513920
- Johnson, Kay (2016) "The Battle in Hutchinson, Sept 4., 1862" Crow River Media 2016-09-04. Retrieved 2023-09-15
- Anderson, Gary Clayton (2019) Massacre in Minnesota: The Dakota War of 1862, the Most Violent Ethnic Conflict in American History Oklahoma University Press ISBN 978-0-8061-9199-7
- Eggleston, Michael A. (2012). The Tenth Minnesota Volunteers, 1862-1865: A History of Action in the Sioux Uprising and the Civil War, with a Regimental Roster. Jefferson, North Carolina: McFarland.
- Pendergast, William (1901) "SKETCHES OF THE HISTORY OF HUTCHINSON" McLeod Co., MN
- Haines, Brian (2018) "MORE TO THE STORY: A Memorial that Stands for the Innocent" Crow River Media Retrieved 2023-09-19
- Haines, Brian (2020) "MORE TO THE STORY: Recollections of the Battle for Hutchinson" Crow River Media Retrieved 2023-09-17
