= Forest City Township, Meeker County, Minnesota =

Forest City Township, Minnesota
- Township
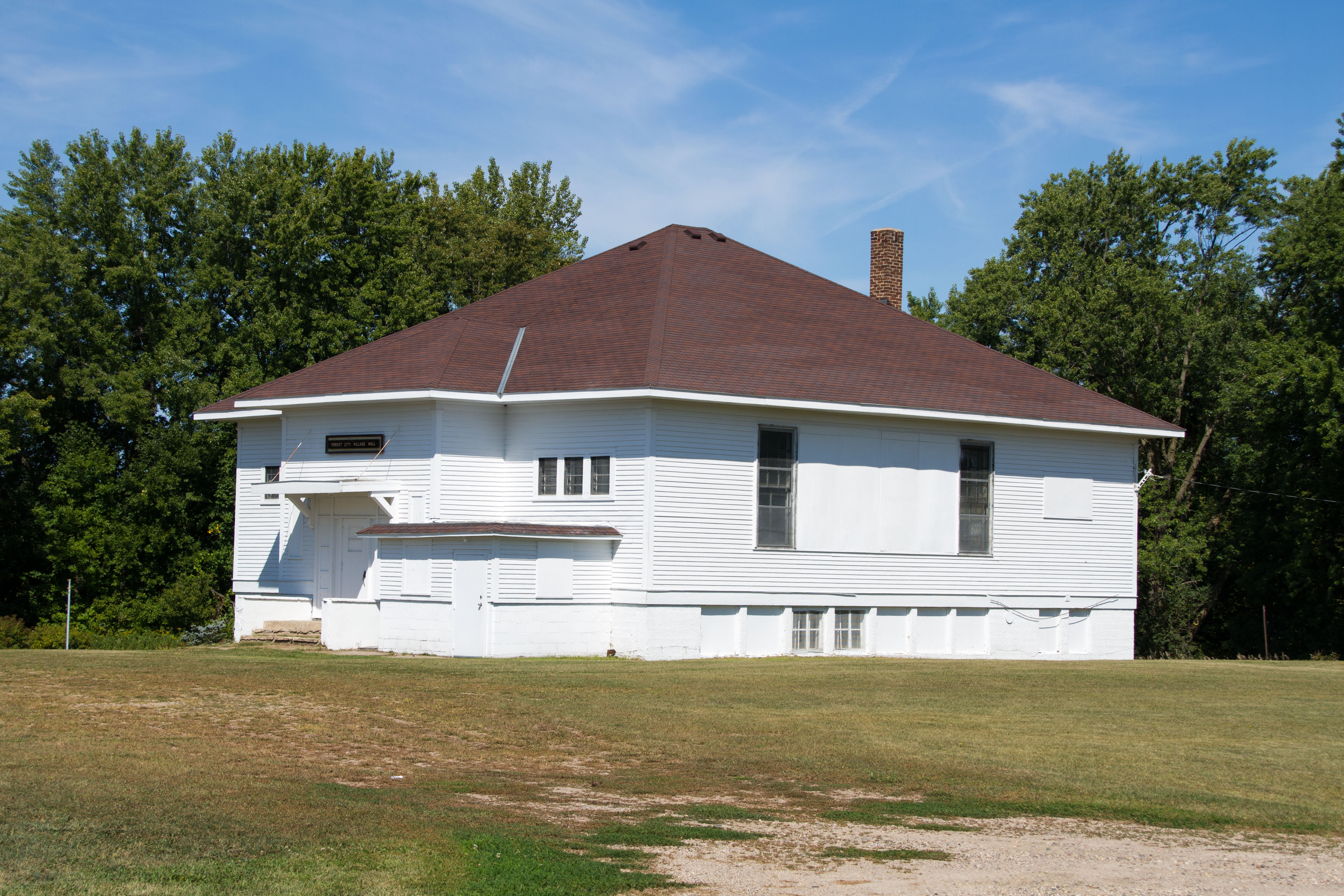
- Forest City Village Hall

- Location within the state of Minnesota Forest City Township, Minnesota (the United States)
- Coordinates: 45°12′N 94°26′W
- Country: United States
- State: Minnesota
- County: Meeker

Area
  - Total: 35.7 sq mi (92.5 km^{2})
  - Land: 34.4 sq mi (89.0 km^{2})
  - Water: 1.4 sq mi (3.6 km^{2})
- Elevation: 1,106 ft (337 m)

Population (2000)
  - Total: 666
  - Density: 19/sq mi (7.5/km^{2})
- Time zone: UTC-6 (Central (CST))
  - Summer (DST): UTC-5 (CDT)
- FIPS code: 27-21734
- GNIS feature ID: 0664192

Forest City Township is a township in Meeker County, Minnesota, United States. The population was 666 at the 2000 census. The unincorporated community of Forest City is located within Forest City Township.

== History ==
Forest City Township was organized in 1858, and named after Forest City.

Forest City is the site of the historical Forest City Stockade, which played a significant part in the Dakota War of 1862.

== Geography ==
According to the United States Census Bureau, the township has a total area of 35.7 square miles (92 km^{2}), of which 34.3 square miles (89 km^{2}) is land and 1.4 square miles (3.6 km^{2}) (3.84%) is water.

Minnesota State Highway 24 and Meeker County Road 2 are the main routes in the township.

Forest City Township is located in Township 120 North of the Arkansas Base Line and Range 30 West of the 5th Principal Meridian.

== Demographics ==
As of the census of 2000, there were 666 people, 233 households, and 189 families residing in the township. The population density was 19.4 inhabitants per square mile (7.5/km^{2}). There were 257 housing units at an average density of 7.5 per square mile (2.9/km^{2}). The racial makeup of the township was 98.95% White, 0.30% Native American, 0.30% from other races, and 0.45% from two or more races. Hispanic or Latino of any race were 0.30% of the population.

There were 233 households, out of which 42.1% had children under the age of 18 living with them, 76.4% were married couples living together, 1.7% had a female householder with no husband present, and 18.5% were non-families. 15.0% of all households were made up of individuals, and 7.7% had someone living alone who was 65 years of age or older. The average household size was 2.86 and the average family size was 3.19.

In the township the population was spread out, with 31.7% under the age of 18, 5.4% from 18 to 24, 29.0% from 25 to 44, 24.2% from 45 to 64, and 9.8% who were 65 years of age or older. The median age was 37 years. For every 100 females, there were 105.6 males. For every 100 females age 18 and over, there were 112.6 males.

The median income for a household in the township was $49,083, and the median a family is $52,375. Males had a median income of $30,833 versus $22,917 for females. The per capita income for the township was $17,590. About 4.6% of families and 4.5% of the population were below the poverty line, including 3.2% of those under age 18 and 17.5% of those age 65 or over.
