= New Albany National Cemetery =

Historic veterans cemetery in Floyd County, Indiana

- U.S. National Register of Historic Places
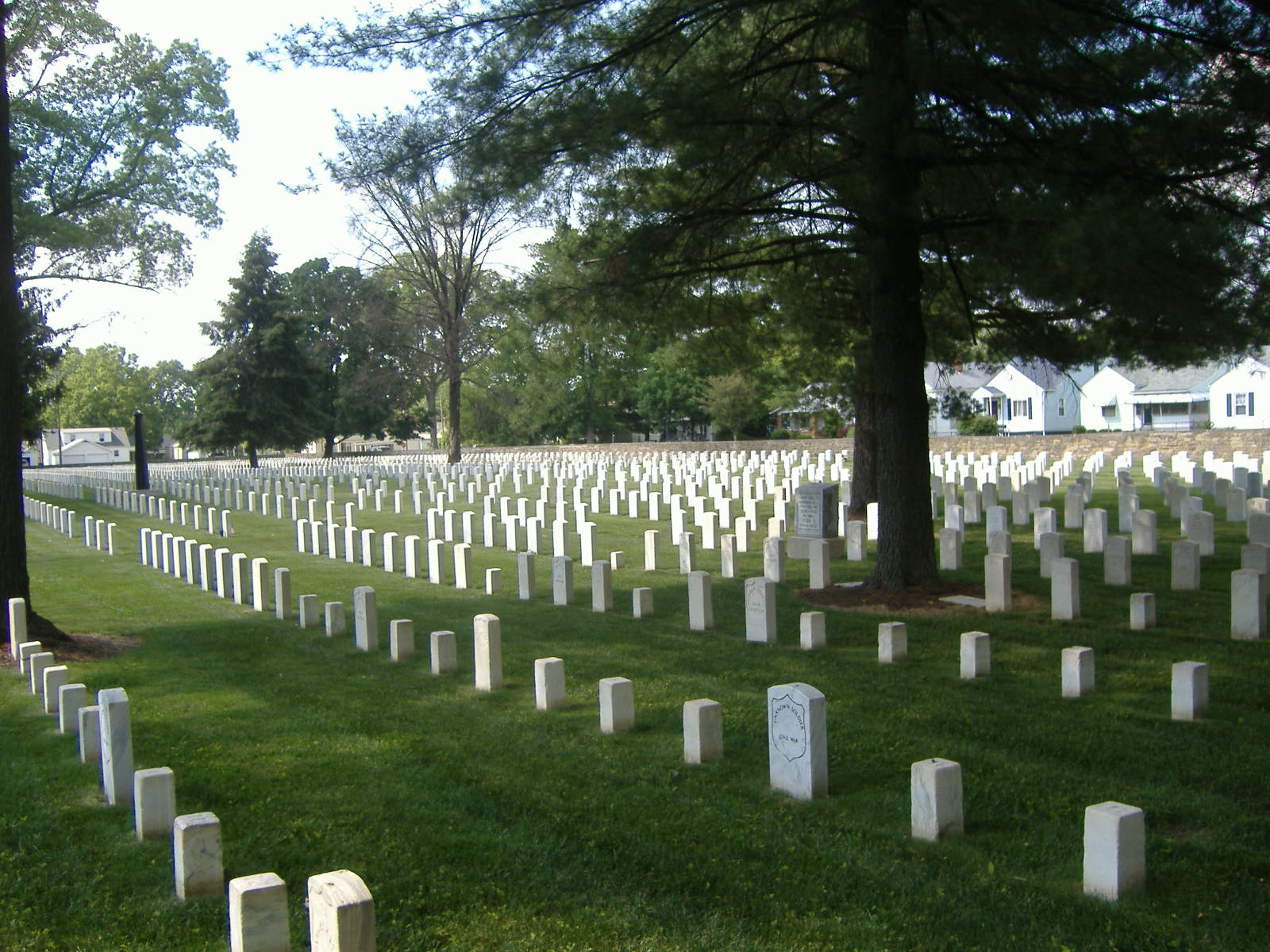
- New Albany National Cemetery graves, June 2008

- Location within Indiana Location within the United States
- Location: 1943 Ekin Ave., New Albany, Indiana
- Coordinates: 38°18′00″N 85°48′20″W
- Area: 6.3 acres (2.5 ha)
- Built: 1862
- MPS: Civil War Era National Cemeteries MPS
- NRHP reference No.: 99000735
- Added to NRHP: June 25, 1999

New Albany National Cemetery is a United States National Cemetery located in the city of New Albany, Indiana. Administered by the United States Department of Veterans Affairs, it encompasses 5.5 acres (2.2 ha), and as of the end of 2005, had 6,881 interments. It is managed by Zachary Taylor National Cemetery.

== History ==
New Albany National Cemetery was established in 1862, purchased from local land owner, Dr. Charles Bowman, to inter soldiers who died while serving at the training ground of Camp Noble. Many of the initial interments were also transferred from nearby military hospital cemeteries. The cemetery contains almost three hundred Union soldiers, and two unknown Confederate soldiers.

New Albany National Cemetery was placed on the National Register of Historic Places in 1999.

== Gallery ==
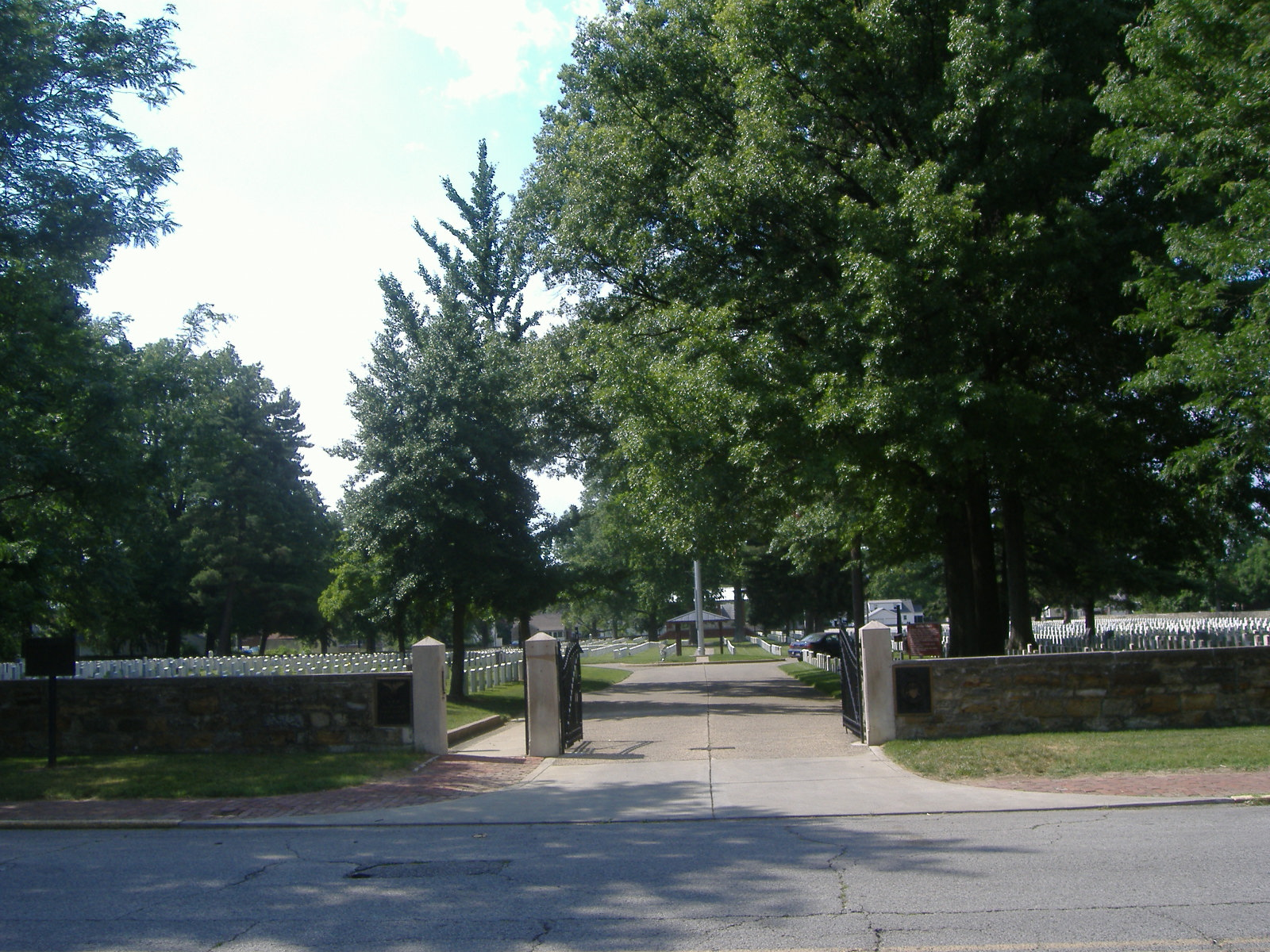
Entrance to the cemetery

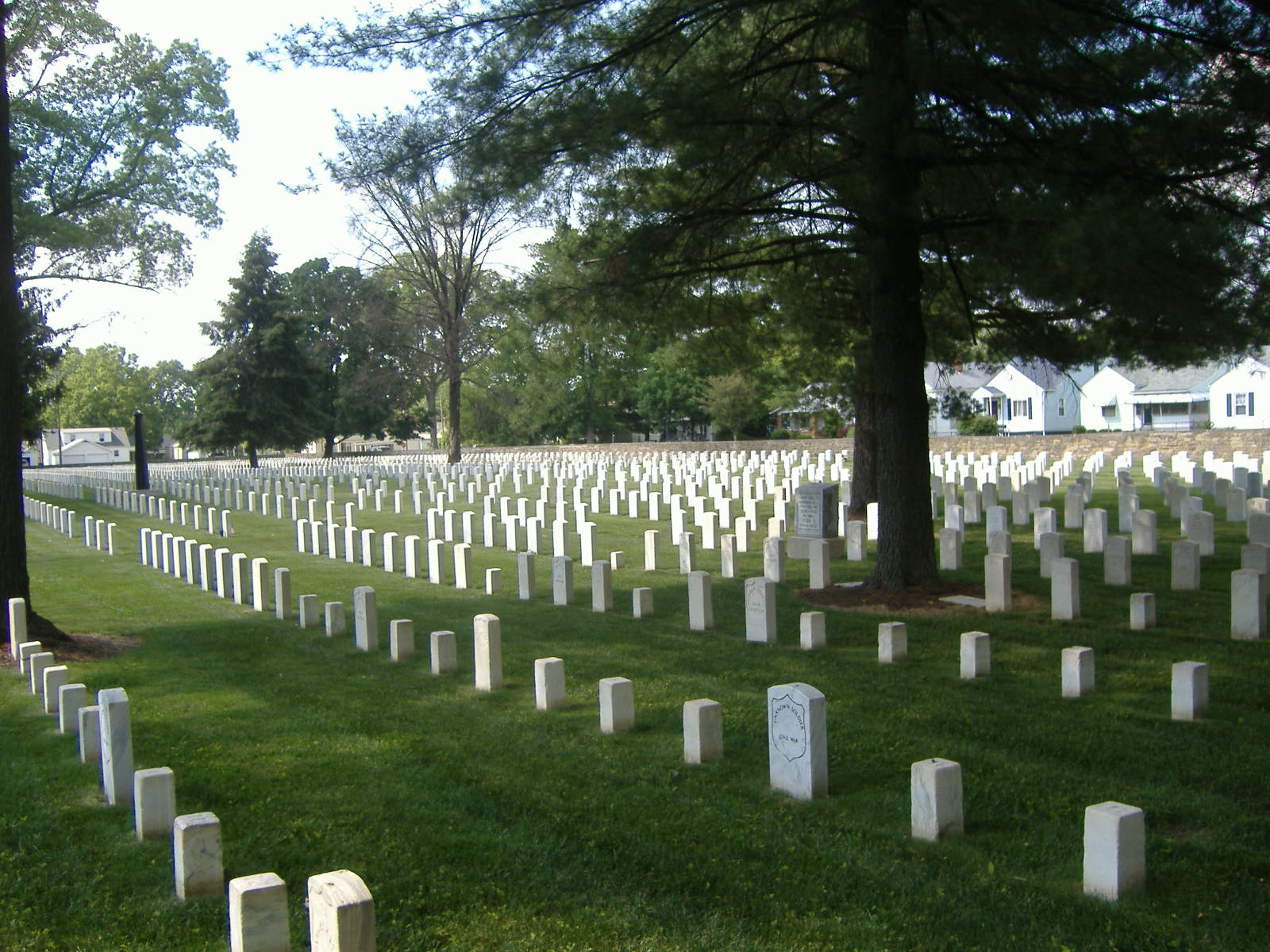
Graves in the cemetery

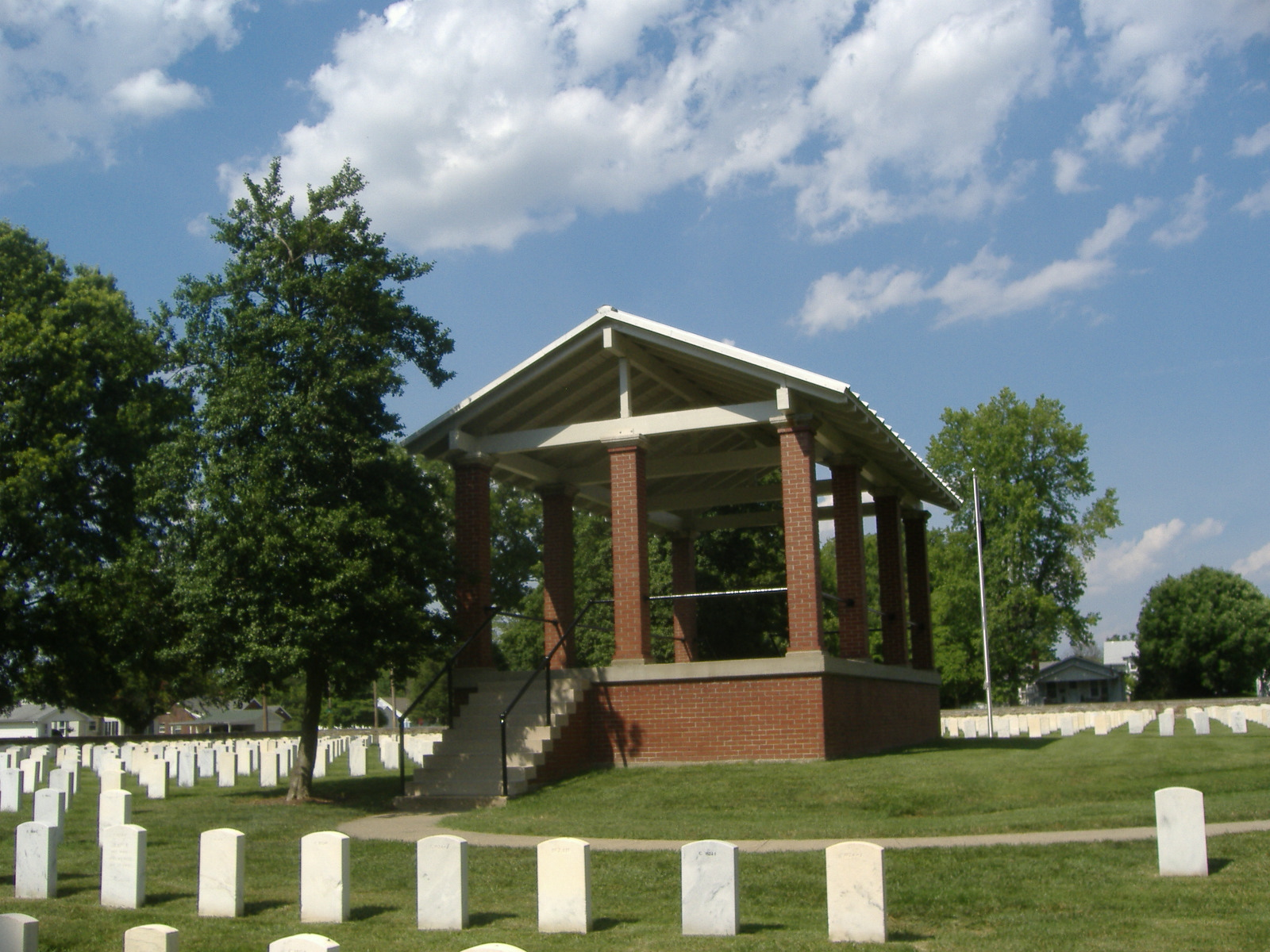
Rostrum of the cemetery

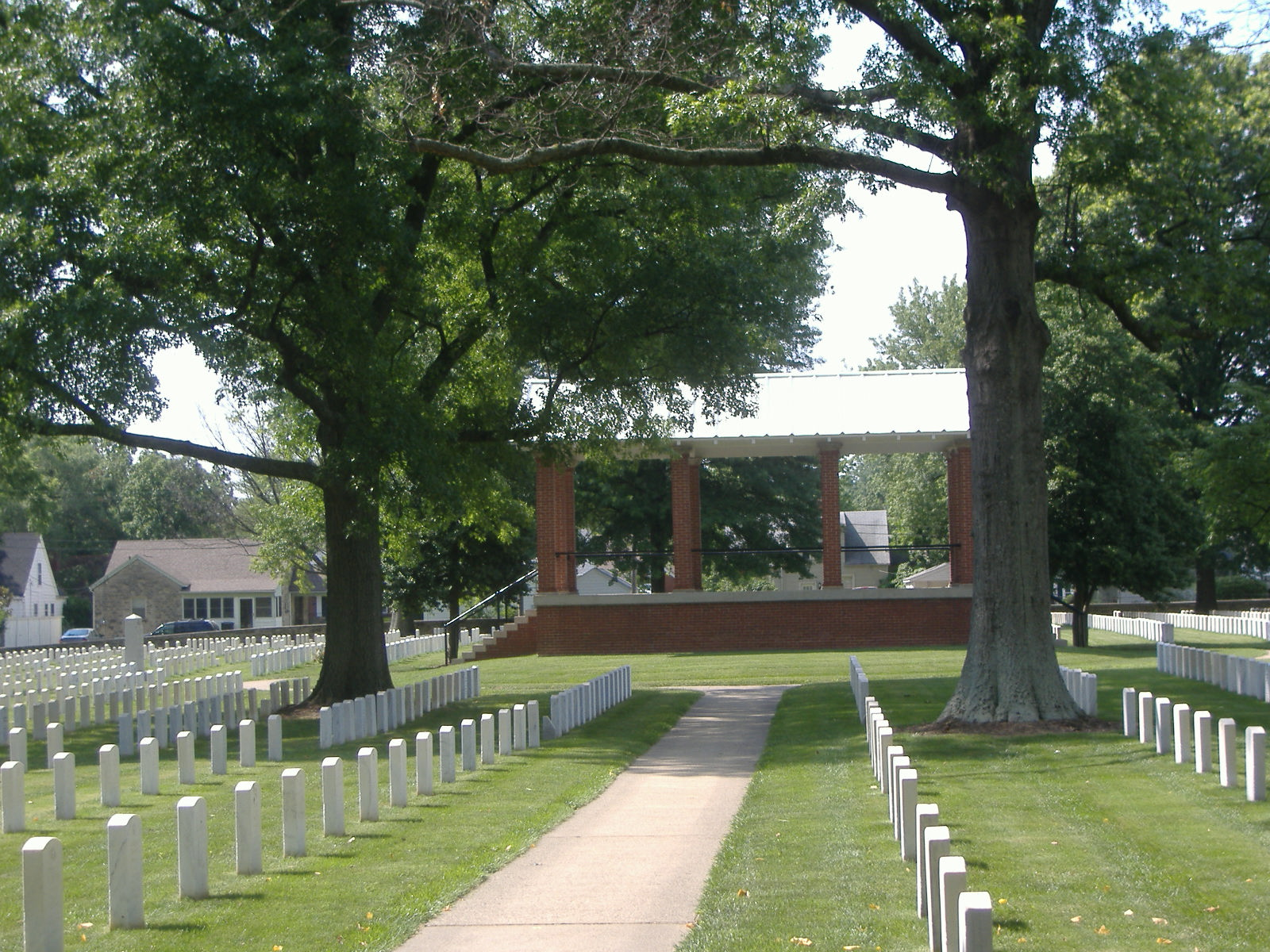
Distant view of the rostrum
