= Alexander Wilkin =

American politician

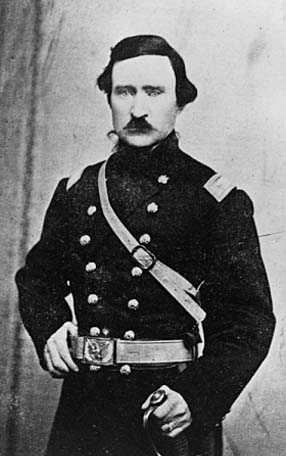
- Wilkin in 1863

2nd Minnesota Territory Secretary of State
- In office October 23, 1851 – May 15, 1853
- Governor: Alexander Ramsey
- Preceded by: Charles K. Smith
- Succeeded by: Joseph Rosser

Personal details
- Born: December 1, 1819 Goshen, New York
- Died: July 14, 1864 (aged 44) Tupelo, Mississippi
- Resting place: Slate Hill Cemetery; Goshen, New York
- Other political affiliations: Whig
- Parent(s): Samuel J. Wilkin; Sarah Gale Westcott
- Education: Yale University

Military service
- Allegiance: United States of America
- Branch/service: United States Army (1847-1848); Union Army (1861-1864)
- Years of service: 1847-1864
- Rank: Colonel
- Unit: 10th Infantry Regiment; Company A, 1st Minnesota Infantry Regiment; 2nd Minnesota Infantry Regiment; 9th Minnesota Infantry Regiment
- Commands: 9th Minnesota Infantry Regiment
- Battles/wars: Mexican-American War; American Civil War †

Alexander Wilkin (1 December 1819 – 14 July 1864) was a soldier during the Mexican–American War and the American Civil War. Wilkin also played a role in the development of Minnesota Territory, having been its second territorial secretary from 1851 till 1853. In 1861, he was deployed in the Civil War, where he would die at the Battle of Tupelo.

== Life ==
Wilkin was born on 1 December 1819, in Goshen, New York. His father Samuel J. Wilkin as well as his grandfather James W. Wilkin were politicians. Alexander studied law at Yale and became an attorney. In 1847, he joined the Tenth United States Army and became a captain. The army was deployed to Northern Mexico. Wilkin saw little action during his deployment, but gained a reputation as a serious soldier, and a man not to trifle with. However, on 20 January 1848, he shot and killed Joshua W. Collett in a duel. Despite his later regrets, he quoted that he "never felt cooler in his life".

On 6 March 1848, he resigned his post and moved to Saint Paul, Minnesota Territory, in 1849. Two years later, President Millard Fillmore gave him the office of territorial secretary of the Minnesota Territory. The office was given to him presumably as a political favor (Wilkin was a Whig), and he served the office until 1853. While living in St. Paul, Wilkin invested in land, railroads, and newspapers. He worked as a lawyer and insurance agent. He also created the St. Paul Fire and Marine Insurance Company, the forerunner of what would become Travelers Insurance.

When the Civil War began in April 1861, he was elected head of the "Pioneer Guard", the name of a St. Paul–based militia unit. On 21 July 1861, Wilkin fought in the ill-fated Battle of Bull Run, in which the Union forces were defeated. For his bravery during the battle Wilkin was made a captain in the regular army. Before he could report, he received a promotion to major with the 2nd Minnesota Volunteer Infantry. This new regiment, based in Lebanon, Kentucky, fought in the Battle of Mill Springs on 18 January 1862. When Wilkin's regiment was asked to intervene in a siege in Corinth, Mississippi, where he served with General Tecumseh Sherman. Shortly afterward, the 9th Minnesota Volunteer Infantry Regiment elected him colonel, and on 26 December 1862, he commanded nearly 250 soldiers at the execution of 38 Dakota men in Mankato, Minnesota. He then established his headquarters as well as a military training school in St. Peter.

In October 1863, the Ninth Minnesota were sent to Missouri. The following May, the regiment marched to Memphis, Tennessee, and raised an army tasked with eliminating the threat that Nathan Bedford Forrest's cavalry was posing to the area. On 10 June 1864, Wilkin fought at the Battle of Brice's Crossroads which earned him praise for his bravery despite the Confederate victory. On 14 July 1864, he would face the battle that would come to be his last. Another expeditionary force decided to operate against Forrest. This force, operated by Wilkin, headed to Tupelo, Mississippi, where he was shot to death while speaking to another soldier. Initially he was buried near where he fell, but his family recovered his remains and buried them in Goshen, where he had been born. His father, Samuel Wilkin, outlived him by 20 months before dying in 1866.

== Legacy ==
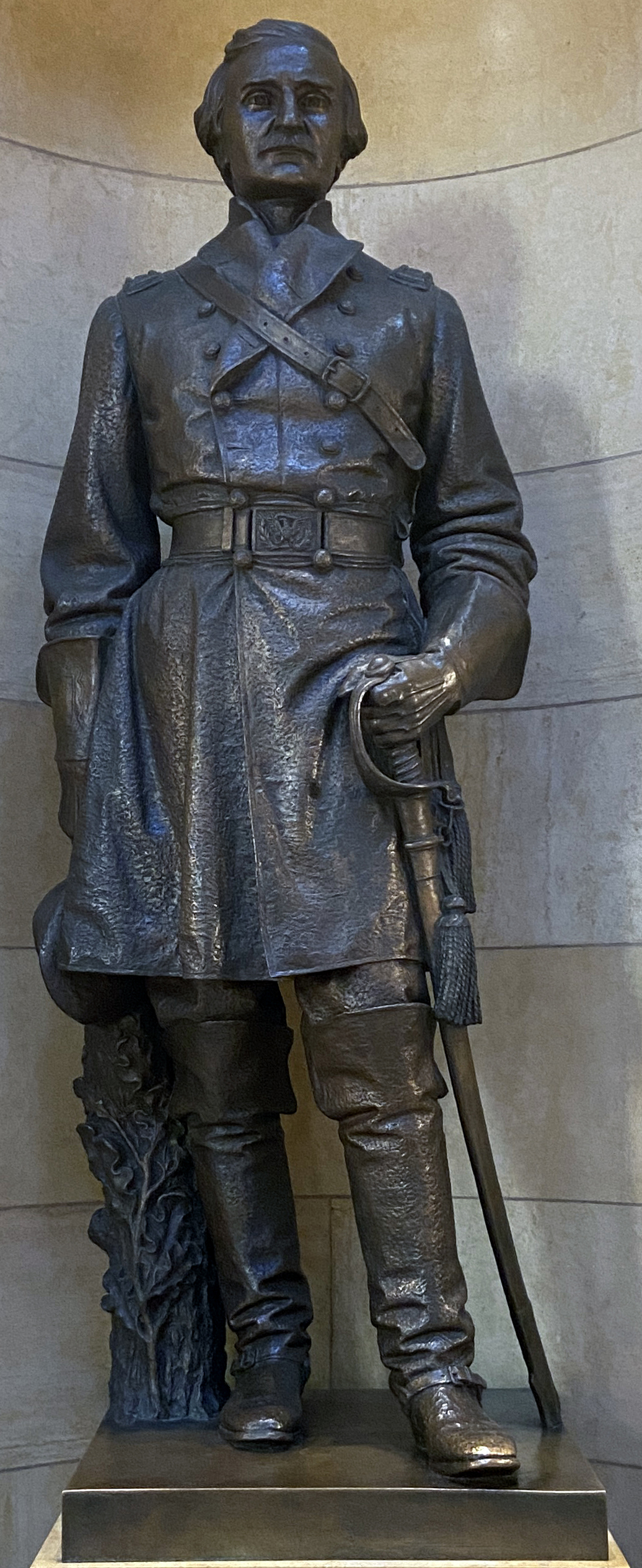
Statue of Alexander Wilkin

In 1868, Wilkin County, Minnesota, was formed as a way to honor the leader. A statue of him was erected in the Minnesota State Capitol in 1910.
