= Acton, Minnesota =

- Unincorporated community
- Location within Minnesota Location within the United States
- Coordinates: 45°05′03″N 94°39′39″W
- Country: United States
- State: Minnesota
- County: Meeker
- Township: Acton
- Elevation: 1,184 ft (361 m)
- Time zone: UTC-6 (Central (CST))
  - Summer (DST): UTC-5 (CDT)
- ZIP code: 56243, 56209, and 55355
- Area code: 320
- GNIS feature ID: 654561

Acton (/ˈæktən/ AK-tən) is an unincorporated community in Acton Township, Meeker County, Minnesota, United States, near Grove City and Litchfield. The community is located along Meeker County Road 23 near State Highway 4 (MN 4). County Road 32 is also in the immediate area.

== History ==
A post office called Acton was established in 1857, and remained in operation until 1904. The community was named after Acton, Ontario.

=== Dakota War of 1862 ===
==== Acton Incident ====
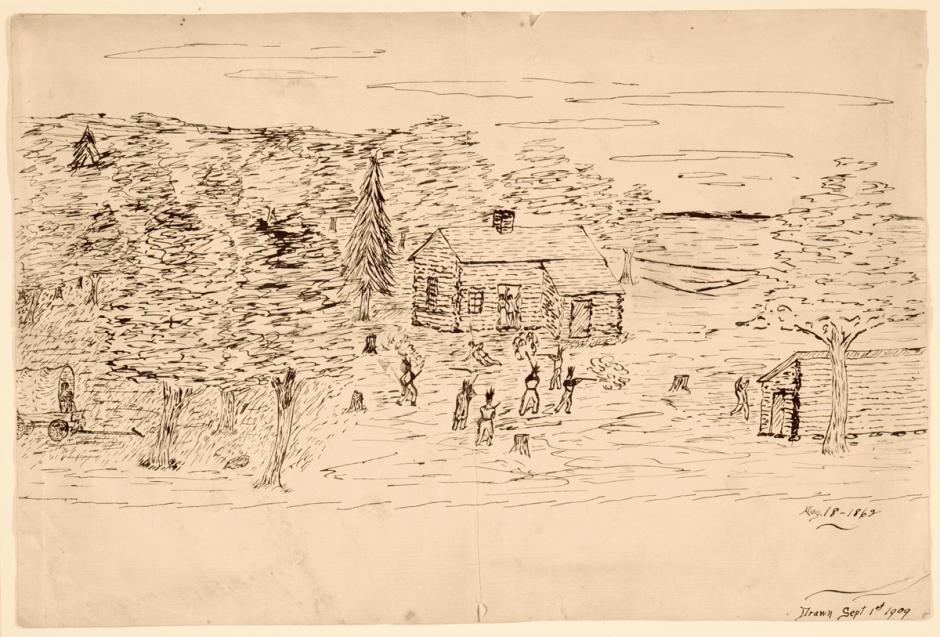
1909 illustration of the Acton Incident

The incident that sparked the Dakota War of 1862 took place near Acton on August 17, 1862. Four Mdewakantons, Sungigidan (“Brown Wing”), Kaomdeiyeyedan (“Breaking Up”), Nagiwicakte (“Killing Ghost”), and Pazoiyopa (“Runs Against Something When Crawling”) from Rice Creek Village in the Lower Sioux Agency, returning home from an unsuccessful hunt, had a confrontation with Robinson Jones, a settler, which resulted in the Mdewakantons killing five settlers, including Jones.

Eager to prove themselves following an argument about whether or not they should steal eggs from a white-owned farmstead, the four had called at the house of Acton postmaster and storekeeper Robinson Jones. Jones accused one of the Dakotas of failing to return a gun he had borrowed from him and drove the Dakotas out of his house after an argument. The four Dakota then went to the nearby house of Howard Baker, where they requested water and tobacco and were accommodated by Mrs. Baker. Mr. and Mrs. Jones then also came to the Baker house, where Mr. Jones renewed his argument about the gun. Mrs. Baker, alarmed by the heated discourse, asked Mrs. Jones if she had given the Dakotas liquor. Mrs. Jones replied that she "had no liquor for such black devils as these." The furious Dakotas then challenged the whites to a shooting match. After all parties had emptied their guns, the Dakota men then reloaded theirs and shot dead Mr. and Mrs. Jones, Mr. Baker, and Viranus Webster, a newly-arrived settler who with his wife had been spending the night with the Bakers.

Mrs. Baker, shocked by what she had witnessed, tried to flee carrying her child but stumbled into a cellar; she was not pursued. The four young Dakotas then returned to the Jones homestead, where they shot and killed 15-year-old Clara Wilson, who had been living with the Joneses.

Realizing the gravity of the situation, the four young Dakota men hastened to the home of Little Crow, who convened that night. After much debate a faction led by Little Crow resolved to begin the Dakota War at sunrise.

==== Battle of Acton ====
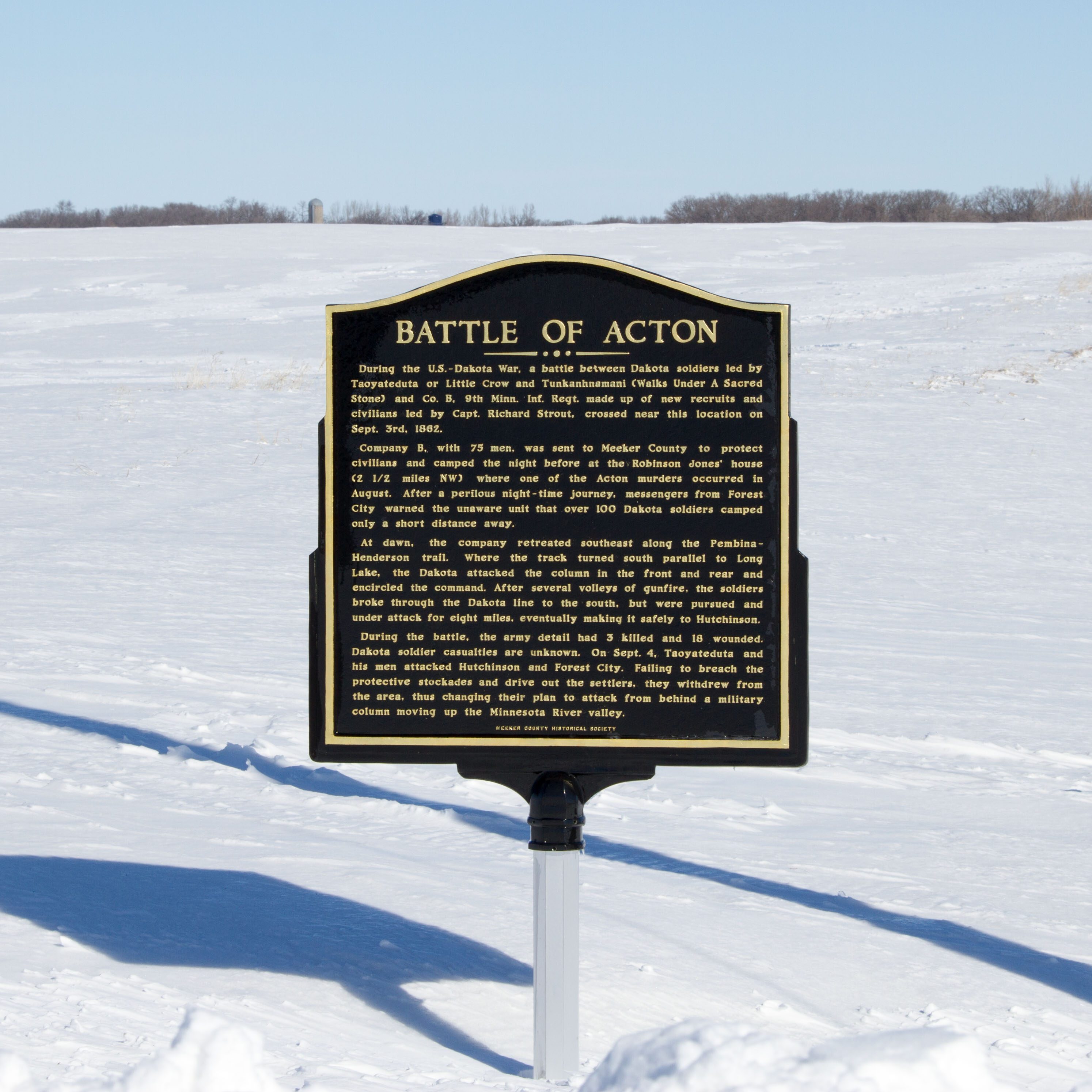
Battle of Acton historical marker

On September 3, a 55-man company of the newly-formed 10th Minnesota Volunteer Infantry Regiment was routed by a band of Dakota warriors near Acton. Led by Capt. Richard Strout, the regiment managed to break free and was pursued eight miles to Hutchinson. Six of the soldiers were killed and 23 wounded. The number of Dakota dead and wounded is not known.
