= 10th Minnesota Infantry Regiment =

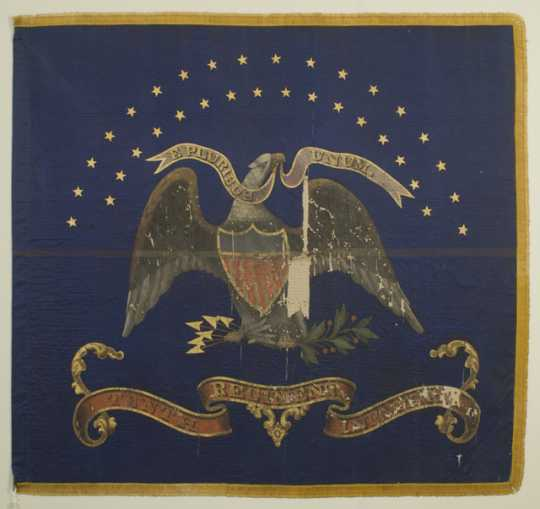
- 10th Minnesota Infantry Regiment Battle Flag
- Active: August 12, 1862 – August 28, 1865
- Disbanded: August 28, 1865
- Country: United States
- Allegiance: Union
- Branch: Infantry
- Size: Regiment
- Engagements: American Civil War: Dakota War of 1862; Battle of Fort Ridgely; Battle of New Ulm; Battle of Acton; Attack on Hutchinson; Battle of Wood Lake; Sibley's 1863 Campaign; Battle of Big Mound; Battle of Dead Buffalo Lake; Battle of Stony Lake; Forrest's Defense of Mississippi; Battle of Tupelo; Price's Missouri Expedition; Battle of Westport; Franklin-Nashville Campaign; Battle of Nashville; Mobile Campaign; Battle of Spanish Fort; Battle of Fort Blakeley

Commanders
- Notable commanders: James H. Baker; Samuel P. Jennison; Michael Cook

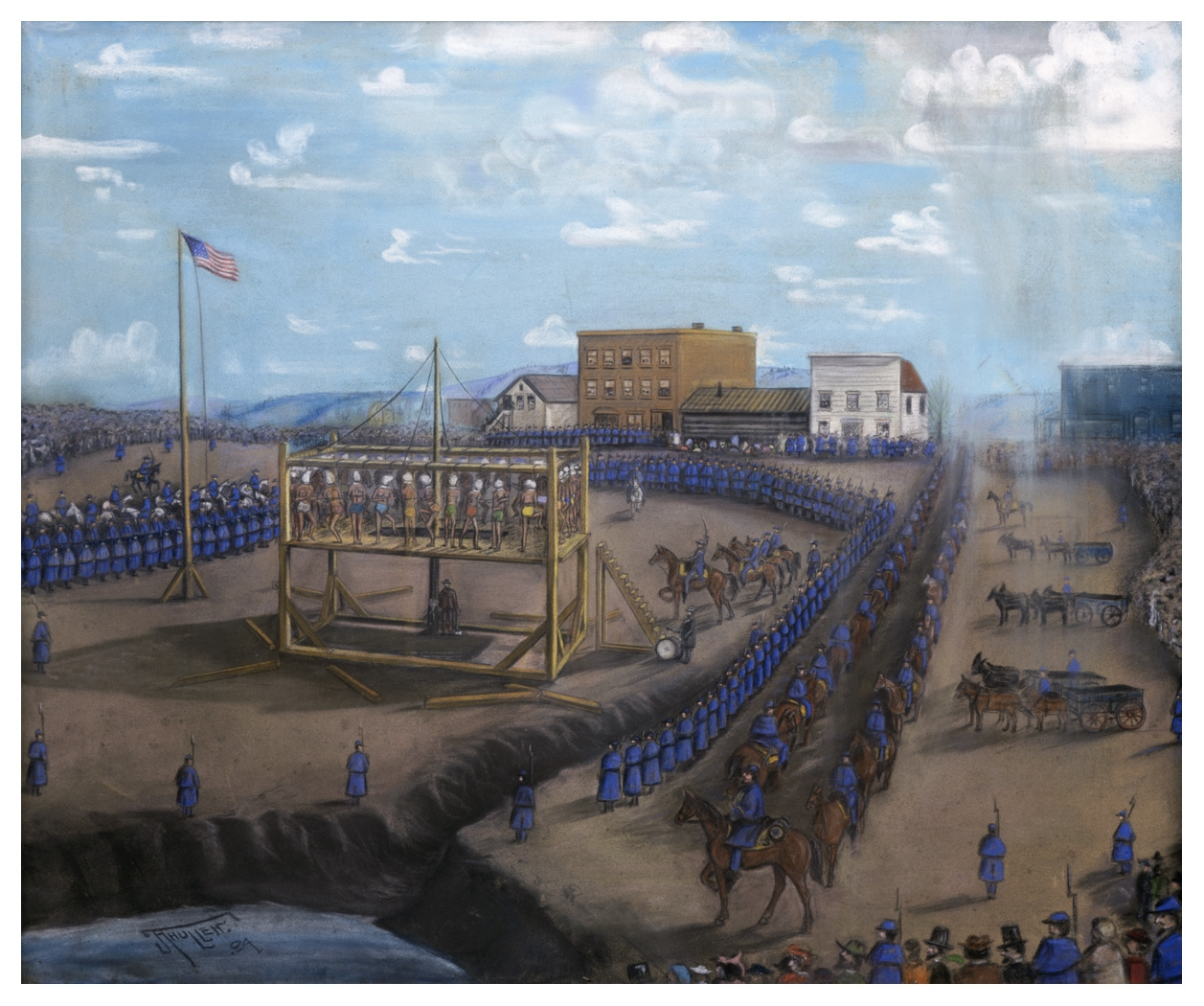
Execution of the 38 Sioux Warriors at Mankato, Minnesota guarded by Companies of the 9th & 10th Minnesota Regiments

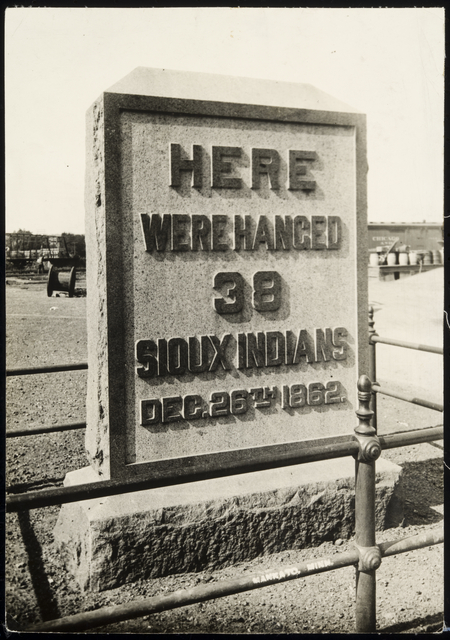
Mankato hanging monument erected for 50th anniversary and removed in 1971.

The 10th Minnesota Infantry Regiment was a Minnesota USV infantry regiment that served in the Union Army during the American Civil War.

== Service ==
The 10th Minnesota Infantry Regiment was recruited into Federal service at Garden City, Winnebago Agency, Fort Snelling and St. Paul, Minnesota, between August 12 and November 15, 1862.

Original Organization of Regiment in 1862.
Company	Primary Place of Recruitment	Earliest Captain
A	Steele County	Rufus Carver Ambler
B	Dodge County	Alonzo J. Edgerton
C	Wabasha County	Charles Wesley Hackett
D	Goodhue County	William Wallace Phelps
E	Freeborn County	James A. Robson†
F	Waseca County and Houston County	George Thomas White
G	Le Sueur County	Edwin C. Sanders
H	Ramsey County, Rice County, and Dakota County	Michael H. Sullivan
I	Sibley County	Martin J. Severance
K	Hennepin County and Ramsey County	Michael J. O'Connor

Company I was formed in January 1863 with men from the deactivated Renville Rangers Militia. Future companies of the regiment such as the Le Seur Tigers fought at New Ulm. They were heavily involved the military actions of 1862 prior to joining the 10th. A Company had men at both the Battle of Birch Coulee and the Battle of Wood Lake. A detachment under Captain Richard Strout first fought at the Battle of Acton and Attack on Hutchinson. This unit would later become Company B of the 9th Minnesota Infantry. Companies G & I were later posted at Fort Ridgely. In December Companies A, B, F, G, H, and K were guards at the execution of 38 Santee Sioux in Mankato. Companies D, E, and H of the 9th Minnesota were there too. The Regiment was part of Gen. Sibleys force at the Battle of Big Mound, Battle of Buffalo Lake, and the Battle of Stony Lake. On May 4, 1863, Company G boarded the riverboat Davenport at Fort Snelling as the escort of the first eastern Dakota to leave the Pike island encampment. The Davenport and the G Company made three trips south with Native Americans. Afterwards the Regiment was sent south to the District of St. Louis. From there they joined the 1st Brigade, 1st Division Army of Tennessee and later the 16th Army Corps in west Mississippi. The 10th Minnesota Infantry was mustered out on August 18, 1865.

== Casualties ==
The 10th Minnesota Infantry suffered 2 officers and 35 enlisted men killed in action or who later died of their wounds, while 4 officers and 111 enlisted died of disease, for 152 fatalities total.

== Commanders ==
- Colonel James H. Baker: August 12, 1862 - August 28, 1865
- Lieutenant Colonel Samuel P. Jennison: August 12, 1862 - August 28, 1865
- Major Michael Cook: August 15, 1862 - December 27, 1864

== Notable people ==
- Alonzo J. Edgerton: Served as the Captain of Company B. Edgerton was later transferred to command the 67th United States Colored Infantry Regiment.
- William Wallace Phelps: Served as the Captain of Company D. Phelps was a notable Minnesota Congressman and lawyer who lived in Goodhue County.
- George C. Pettie: Served as a Private in Company A. Prior to his military service, Pettie previously served in the 1st Minnesota Legislature.

== See also ==
- List of Minnesota Civil War Units
- 9th Minnesota Infantry Regiment
