= Hope Lake (Meeker County, Minnesota) =

Lake in Minnesota, United States

- Location within Minnesota
- Location: Meeker County, Minnesota
- Coordinates: 45°5′N 94°39′W
- Type: lake

Hope Lake is a lake in Meeker County, in the U.S. state of Minnesota.

Hope Lake was originally spelled Hoop Lake, so named for the lake's hoop-shaped outline.

== See also ==
- List of lakes in Minnesota
