= Forest City, Minnesota =

Unincorporated community in Meeker County, Minnesota, US

- Unincorporated community
- Location within Minnesota Location within the United States
- Coordinates: 45°12′23″N 94°27′59″W
- Country: United States
- State: Minnesota
- County: Meeker
- Township: Forest City
- Elevation: 1,070 ft (330 m)
- Time zone: UTC-6 (Central (CST))
  - Summer (DST): UTC-5 (CDT)
- ZIP code: 55355 and 55389
- Area code: 320
- GNIS feature ID: 643796

Forest City is an unincorporated community in Forest City Township, Meeker County, Minnesota, United States, near Litchfield and Watkins. The community is located along Meeker County Road 2 near its junction with State Highway 24 (MN 24). The North Fork of the Crow River flows nearby.

Historical population
Census	Pop.	Note	%±
1870	181		—
U.S. Decennial Census

== History ==
Forest City was platted in 1857, and named for its location near the Big Woods. A post office was established at Forest City in 1856, and remained in operation until 1907.

Forest City was attacked by Little Crow's band of Dakota during the 1862 Dakota War. Several buildings were burned, but the attack was unsuccessful.
