= The Grove (Cold Spring, New York) =

Historic house in New York, United States

- U.S. National Register of Historic Places
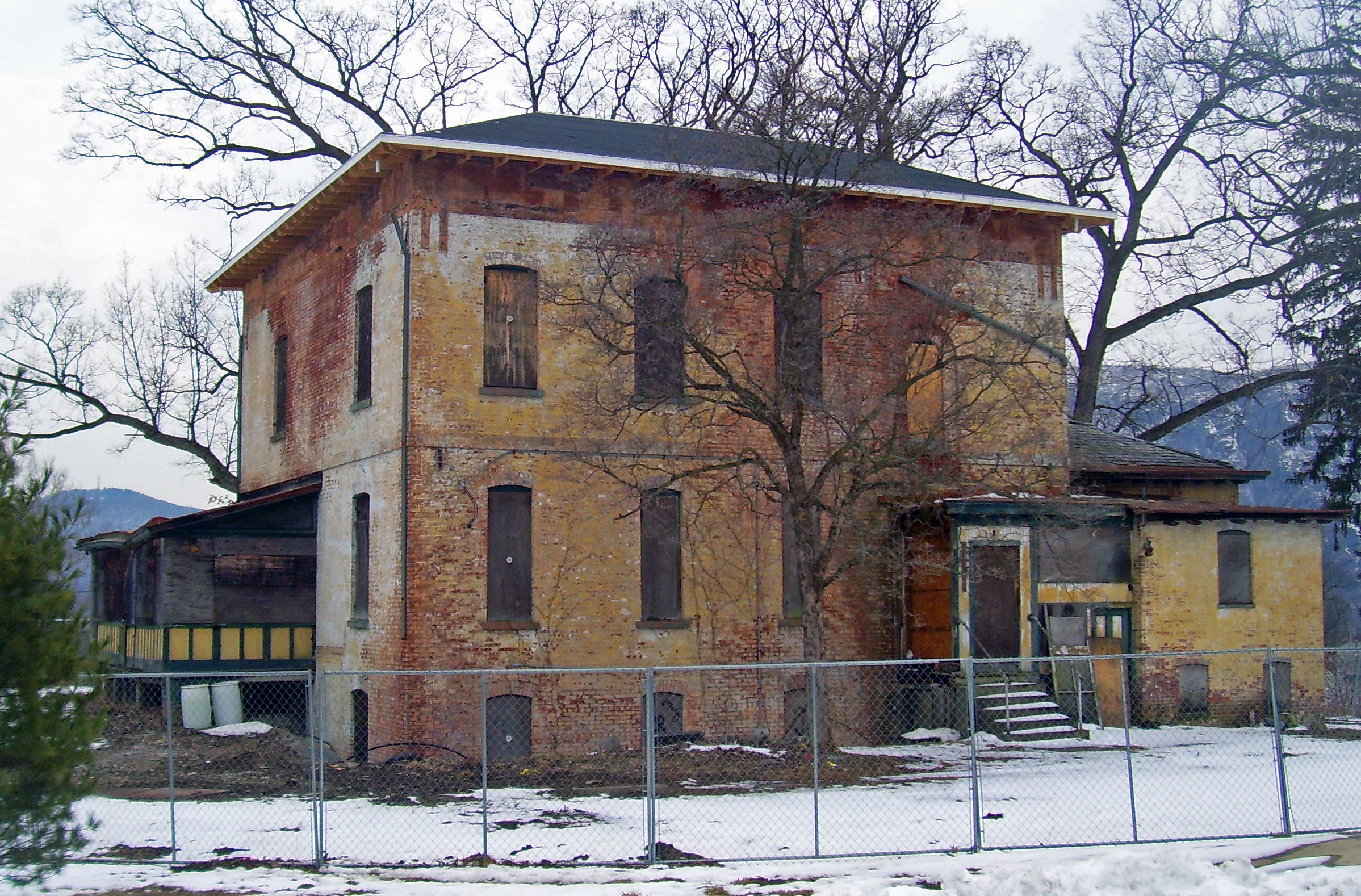
- South profile and east elevation, 2009

- Location within New York Location within the United States
- Location: Cold Spring, NY
- Nearest city: Beacon
- Coordinates: 41°25′6″N 73°57′1″W
- Area: 1 acre (4,000 m^{2})
- Built: 1852–1853
- Architect: Richard Upjohn
- Architectural style: Italianate
- NRHP reference No.: 08001080
- Added to NRHP: November 21, 2008

The Grove, also known as Loretto Rest, is a historic house located on Grove Court in Cold Spring, New York, United States. It was built as the estate of Frederick Lente, surgeon at the nearby West Point Foundry and later a founder of the American Academy of Medicine, in the mid-19th century. The Italian-villa design, popular at the time, was by the prominent architect Richard Upjohn. In 2008 it was listed on the National Register of Historic Places.

A later renovation replaced its original roof with a mansard roof. After the Lente family sold it, it was purchased by the Roman Catholic Church and converted to a convent. That use ended in 1977 and it has remained vacant since then, suffering the effects of neglect and decay.

The surrounding land was subdivided and developed, eliminating much of Upjohn's original landscaping. In the late 2000s the mansard roof was replaced with one more like the original. It is now the property of the village of Cold Spring, which has attempted to preserve but done nothing to restore the estate.

== Building ==
The house is located at the end of Grove Court, a cul-de-sac on the south side of Paulding Avenue just outside downtown Cold Spring to the west, most of which is included in the Cold Spring Historic District, listed on the Register in 1982. All the other houses on the street to the north of the one-acre (4,000 m^{2}) lot where the building stands are of modern, late 20th- and early 21st-century construction and design. To the east is the former Butterfield Memorial Hospital, another large abandoned property awaiting restoration.

A line of mature trees stands along the top of a slight drop to the south which gives it a view over the Hudson River to the United States Military Academy at West Point to the south, Crow's Nest, Storm King and other peaks of the Hudson Highlands to the east and Newburgh Bay to the north. Just below are one-story commercial buildings and their parking lots along the curving section of Chestnut Street, part of New York State Route 9D. A large shopping plaza with a supermarket and the village's post office is just across Chestnut to the southwest. Across the road to the southeast are some of the remaining buildings of the West Point Foundry and its archeological site, both listed on the Register and being considered for National Historic Landmark status.

The building itself is a two-and-a-half-story, three-by-four-bay structure of brick laid in common bond over load-bearing stone. On the northwest is a one-story wing, one bay on all sides, with an additional wooden entrance portico. The house is topped by a low-pitched square hipped roof with a small square cupola in the center. A wooden porch wraps around the western side to the middle of the south. A chain link fence currently surrounds the house.

White paint or other material that once covered the facades has begun to fade, exposing the brick beneath. The windows are mostly narrow brick segmental arches with projecting stone sills. They are all boarded up. Metal mounts for shutters formerly there remain. A belt brick course separates the two stories.

On the west (front) facade, the segmental-arched main entrance, marked by a molded wooden frame flush with the wall and a four-light transom, is flanked by two arched windows. The southern bay has an oriel window with bracketed pilasters and a molded pediment. These features are currently concealed by a wooden barrier at the face of the porch.

The south side has a center door at the basement level. On the east, facing the cul-de-sac, is another door in the northern bay, with a small wooden porch and concrete steps. Above it is a round-arched window rising from the belt course, outlined in brick headers within a recess.

The north face has the same narrow segmental-arched windows in its two western bays. On the north end of the wing is a wooden entrance portico with half-hipped roof. It otherwise has the same window treatment, with two on the north and one on the west.

At the roofline are broad overhanging eaves. Bare spots on the brick below mark the locations of the brackets that once supported them. In its center the roof's cupola is pierced by a single ventilation shaft.

The interior has suffered from the same neglect as the outside, and many of its original finishings have been damaged. Many original features remain, however. The center-hall floor plan on both stories has not been altered, and the plaster walls, ceilings and wood trim, including the staircase with turned first-floor newel post appear to be original. Some stenciled decoration is on its wall.

== History ==
Frederick Lente, a North Carolina native who had earned his medical degree at University Medical College of New York, now the New York University medical school, came to Cold Spring in 1850 to serve as the surgeon at the West Point Foundry. His father-in-law, William Kemble, had been one of the founding members of the Foundry Association. At that time the foundry was the largest maker of iron and brass in the country. Located along the banks of a small cove where a small brook flowed into the Hudson River on the south side of the village, it made both military and civilian products, from cannon to the pipes that were laid to open the Croton Aqueduct and bring clean water to Manhattan.

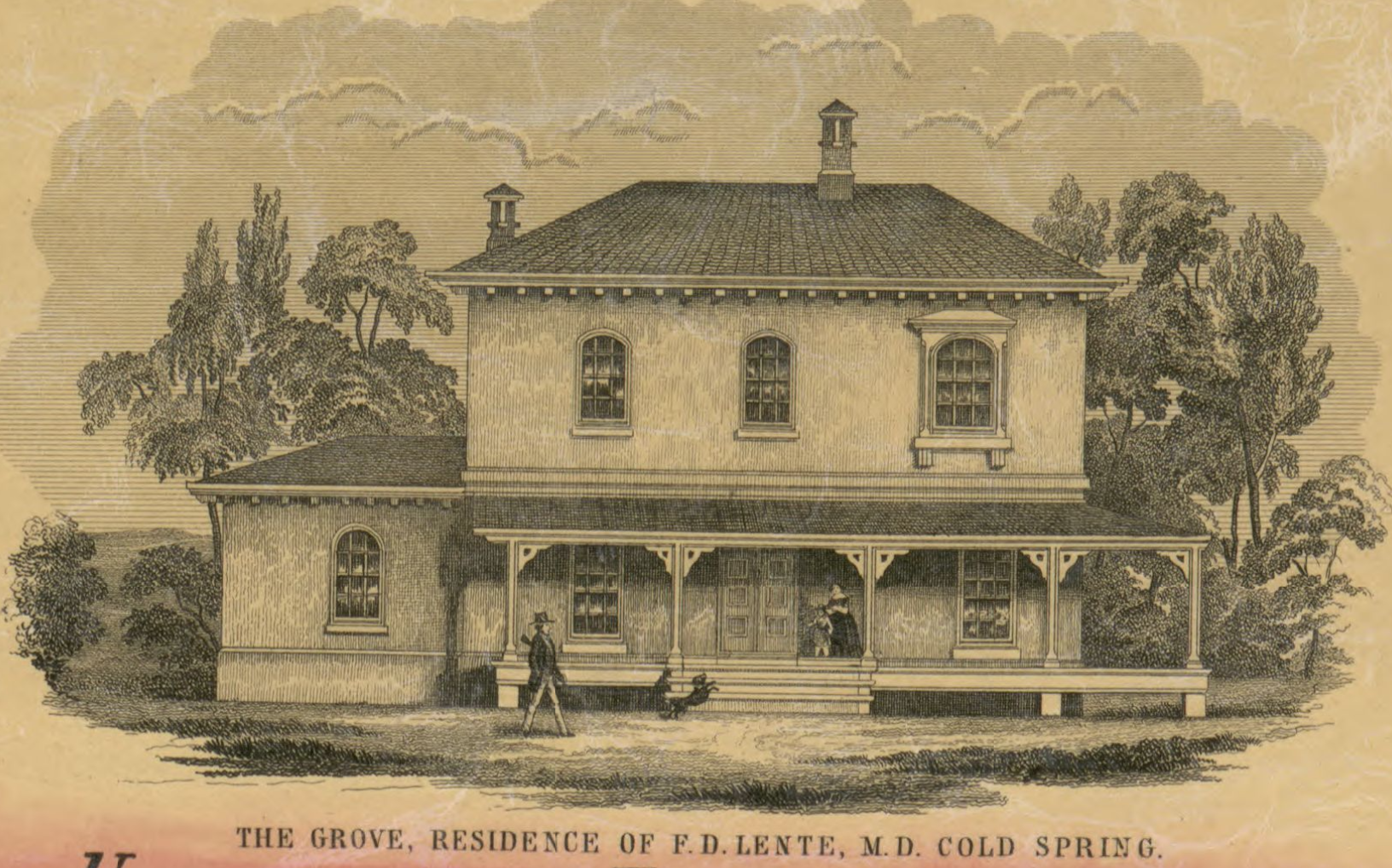
The Grove as it appeared after its completion

In 1852, the Foundry Association sold Lente the four-and-a-half-acre (1.8 ha) parcel where the house and Grove Court now stand. He soon commissioned Richard Upjohn to design the house he wanted to live in. Upjohn, an English immigrant had made his reputation popularizing the Gothic Revival mode for stone churches such as New York's Trinity Church. But he had also pioneered the Italianate-styled house during the same period with the Edward King House, a National Historic Landmark in Newport, Rhode Island. Closer to Cold Spring, he built the James and Mary Forsyth House up the Hudson in Kingston in 1850.

This was the type of house that Lente wanted, and he had specifics. His correspondence with Upjohn reflects his desire for features like the French windows on the west that slide into their casement. At one point he tells the architect that the upper floor's bedroom was "unnecessarily large" and should be reduced by a foot (30 cm).

The finished house is typical of Upjohn's Italian villas from that period. Its plan is basically rectangular, and it is built of masonry faced in painted brick, with arched windows set with multi-pane sash. The northwest wing is found on his other houses in the Hudson Valley, not only the Forsyth House but former President Martin van Buren's Lindenwald near Kinderhook.

Lente made the house his principal residence for the rest of his life. Before his death in 1883, he published many papers in medical journals. He was a member of many professional societies, and helped found the American Academy of Medicine, an early organization devoted to raising educational standards in the profession.

During the 1870s, it is believed, he made a major alteration in the house. Sometime during that decade, the original hipped roof in Upjohn's design was replaced with a mansard roof, more in keeping with the Second Empire style popular at the time. The roof was clad with polychromatic hexagonal slate shingles, and pierced by flat-roofed dormer windows, three on the long sides and two on the short.

Lente's widow continued to live in the house until her death in 1901. Afterwards it was bought by the parish of Our Lady of Loreto, which converted it into a convent. The Franciscan Sisters ran a school there until 1977.

At some point during the 20th century, louvered window shutters, since removed, were installed. In the 1920s the porch was enclosed with two-over-two sash windows over wood paneling. The rear entrance portico was also enclosed around that time as well. Its entrance doors were removed, and more wood paneling installed. Around 1950 the front and rear steps were replaced in concrete.

After the Franciscans' departure, no new occupant replaced them. The vacant house began to suffer from neglect. In 2002 a developer bought the property and subdivided it to build the houses along Grove Court. He donated the house and the acre that remained to the village, which hoped to restore it and use it as a historic house museum.

The village has not yet succeeded. In late 2008, it had to remove the mansard roof and replace it with the current hipped one, more like the original. Four years later, it put out a request for proposals. It is estimated that it will cost at least $1 million to restore the house. A couple who live in a neighboring house offered to purchase it for $1,000, but the village board rejected that price as "insultingly low."

== See also ==
- National Register of Historic Places listings in Putnam County, New York
