= St. Thomas Episcopal Church (Newark, Delaware) =

Historic church in Delaware, United States

- U.S. National Register of Historic Places
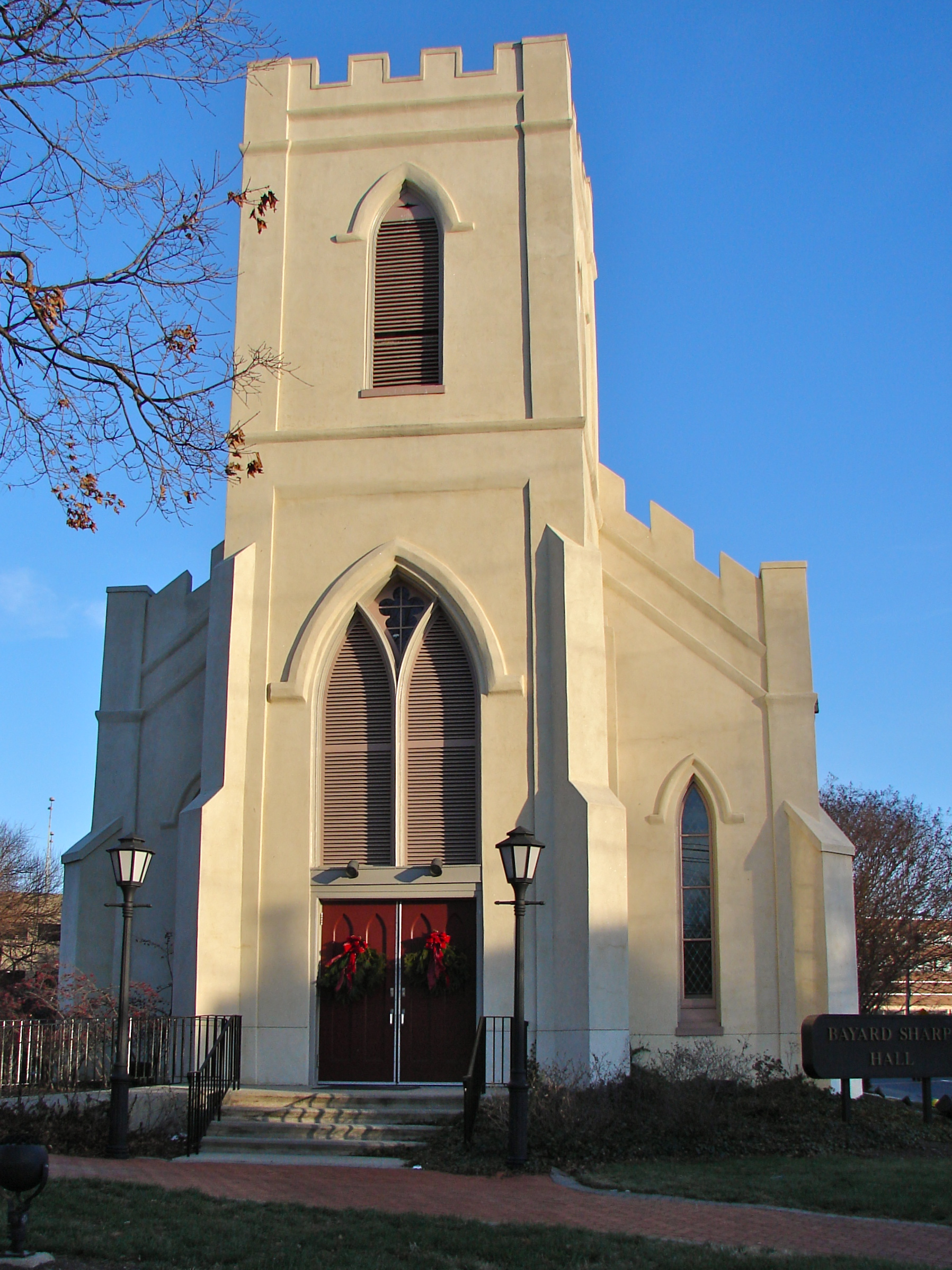
- St. Thomas Episcopal Church, December 2010

- Location within Delaware Location within the United States
- Location: 21 S. Main St., Newark, Delaware
- Coordinates: 39.682097°N 75.756585°W
- Area: 0.5 acres (0.20 ha)
- Built: 1845
- Architect: Upjohn, Richard
- Architectural style: Gothic Revival
- MPS: Newark MRA
- NRHP reference No.: 82002350
- Added to NRHP: May 7, 1982

St. Thomas Episcopal Church is a historic Episcopal church located at 21 South Main Street in Newark, New Castle County, Delaware. It was built in 1843–45 and designed by noted architect Richard Upjohn. It is a one-story, three bay wide brick structure built of brick with stucco facing and a gable roof. It features a 35-foot entrance tower, added in 1866, and is in the Gothic Revival style. In 1956 the building was deconsecrated when the parish moved to a larger church. It has since been bought, restored, and renovated by the University of Delaware, installing a 1,234 pipe organ in the process. The building is now used as a music recital and event hall by the university.

The building was added to the National Register of Historic Places in 1982.

The church reported 290 members in 2017 and 271 members in 2023; no membership statistics were reported in 2024 parochial reports. Plate and pledge income reported for the congregation in 2024 was $311,677 with average Sunday attendance (ASA) of 78 persons. This was a relative decrease from ASA of 152 reported in 2015.

== History ==
The Episcopal parish of St. Thomas was established in Newark in 1843, and a lot at the corner of Elkton Road and Delaware Avenue was purchased for the new church at a cost of $70. Construction started in August of that year and the new building was consecrated on February 25, 1845. The construction cost was approximately $3,825. The church is thought to have been designed by Richard Upjohn, although the available documentation does not completely confirm this. The church was enlarged in 1866, adding a chancel and the 35-foot (11 m) entrance tower. The present stained glass windows were added later in the 19th century.

By the 1950s, St. Thomas Parish had outgrown the old church, moving to a new site on South College Avenue. The old church was deconsecrated and served as Newark's public library from 1956 to 1974, but eventually this tenant too outgrew the building. The vacant church was eventually purchased by the University of Delaware in 1996 and refurbished to fix extensive structural damage due to leaks and neglect. Taking advantage of the church's acoustics, the university turned it into a recital hall equipped with a custom-built Dobson pipe organ and restored 1920 Steinway piano. It was renamed Bayard Sharp Hall after a university donor.

== See also ==
- National Register of Historic Places listings in Newark, Delaware
