= Fairbanks-Williams House =

Historic house in Massachusetts, United States

- U.S. National Register of Historic Places
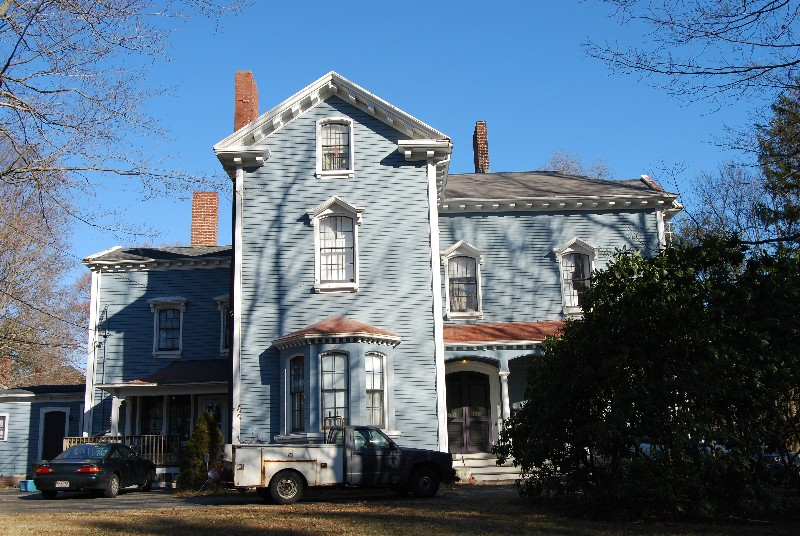

- Location within Massachusetts Location within the United States
- Location: 19 Elm Street, Taunton, Massachusetts
- Coordinates: 41°54′13″N 71°5′10″W
- Built: 1852
- Architect: Richard Upjohn
- Architectural style: Italianate
- MPS: Taunton MRA
- NRHP reference No.: 84002116
- Added to NRHP: July 5, 1984

The Fairbanks-Williams House is a historic house located at 19 Elm Street in Taunton, Massachusetts. Built in 1852, it is the city's only known residential work by the architect Richard Upjohn, and is a fine example of Italianate architecture. It was listed on the National Register of Historic Places in 1984.

== Description and history ==
The house stands in a residential area east of downtown Taunton, on the east side of Elm Street opposite its junction with Vine Street. It is a 2 1/2-story wood-frame structure, with a cross-gabled roof and clapboarded exterior. It is a roughly T-shaped plan, with a central front-gable section, a section projecting right from its midsection, and another projection to the left near the rear. Its roof has extended eaves with large modillion blocks, and windows are set in segmented-arch openings. The front entrance is sheltered by a porch whose sections have a similar segmented-arch valances, supported by chamfered square posts. Windows on the second floor have elaborate surrounds with a bracketed sill and gabled hood. The frontmost section of the main block has a first-floor polygonal bay, topped by a turret-like roof with modillioned eave.

The house was built for W.W. Fairbanks in 1852 and is the only documented residence in the city to be designed by architect Richard Upjohn, who designed several public buildings and churches in the area during the mid-1800s. It was later owned by Abiathar King Williams, a local textile manufacturer, from 1865 to 1890. Between 1910 and 1940, it was owned by Edward Lovering, president of the Whittenton Mills.

== See also ==
- National Register of Historic Places listings in Taunton, Massachusetts
