= Oaklands (Gardiner, Maine) =

Historic house in Maine, United States

- U.S. National Register of Historic Places
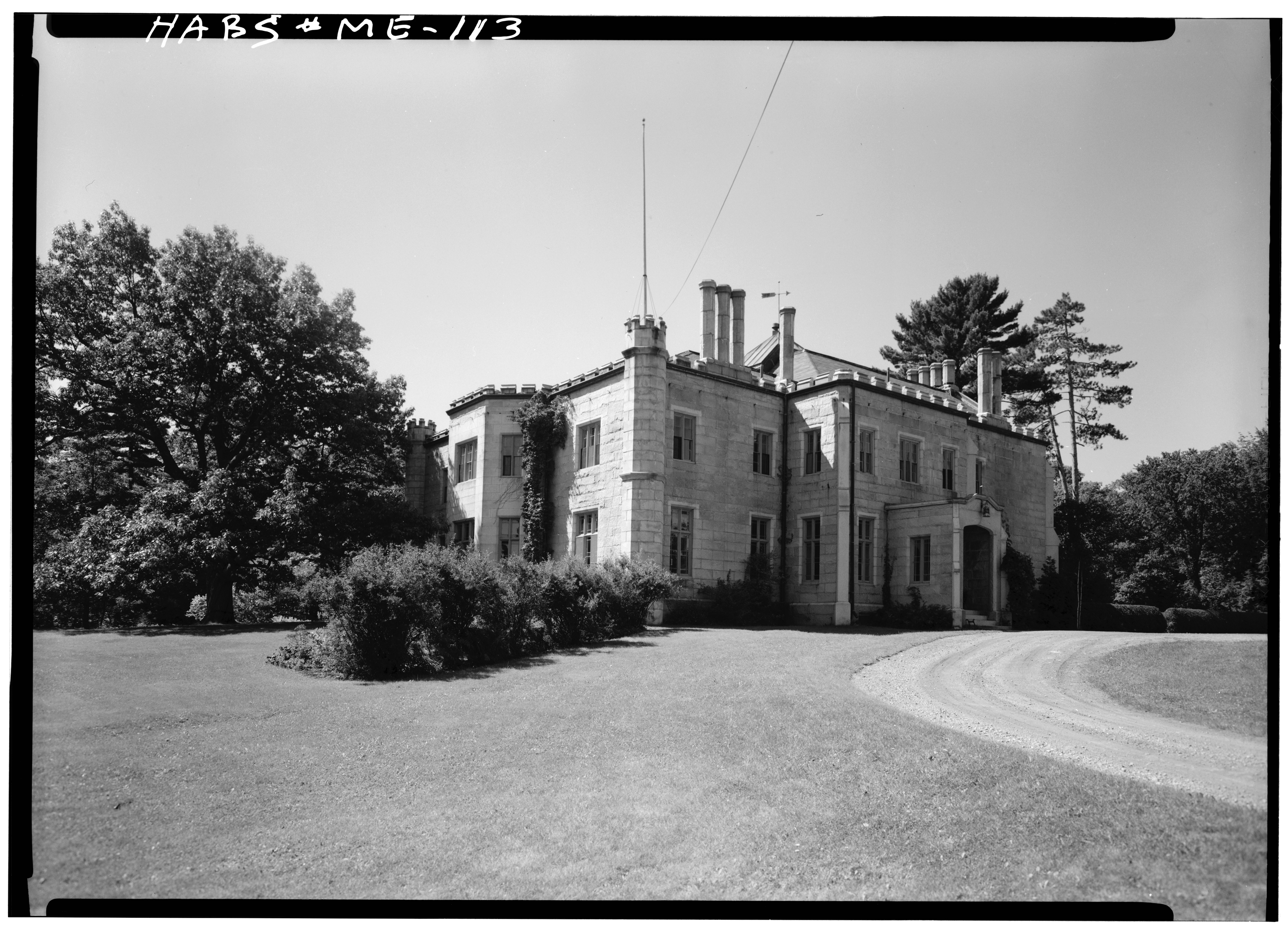
- HABS photo

- Location within Maine Location within the United States
- Location: S end of Dresden St. (Oakland Farms Rd.), Gardiner, Maine
- Coordinates: 44°12′48″N 69°45′58″W
- Area: 5 acres (2.0 ha)
- Built: 1835
- Architect: Richard Upjohn
- Architectural style: Gothic Revival
- NRHP reference No.: 73000131
- Added to NRHP: July 27, 1973

Oaklands, also known locally as Oaklands Castle, is a historic house on Oaklands Farm in southern Gardiner, Maine. The main house of this farm property is a stone Gothic Revival work from the early career of the noted 19th-century architect Richard Upjohn. It was listed on the National Register of Historic Places in 1973.

== Description and history ==
Oaklands Farm is a property of more than 100 acres (40 ha) which has been in the hands of the locally prominent Gardiner family (for whom the city is named) for centuries. The land was granted in the 18th century to Silvester Gardiner, one of the Kennebec Proprietors. Confiscated by the state during the American Revolutionary War (because Gardiner was a Loyalist who fled), it was recovered by Gardiner's grandson and heir, Robert Hallowell Gardiner. Gardiner developed not just the estate, but promoted the growth of the town of Gardiner, and served as its first mayor when it was incorporated. The Oaklands estate house was built in 1835–36 to a design by Richard Upjohn, then in the early stages of his illustrious career.

The Oaklands mansion house stands overlooking the Kennebec River, west of River Road and south of Cottage Road, on the larger Oaklands estate, and is accessed by dirt roads from the north and east. The house has a two-story main block with hip roof, and a three-story ell extending to its west. It is built out of ashlar granite, and features a crenellated parapet around the roof edge, and a projecting bastion-like turret at one corner. It was built out of stone quarried nearby in Hallowell. The larger estate consists of the aforementioned Oaklands mansion, Hallowell House, pond house, and orchard house. It is used as a farm, with sheep, cows, goats, and pigs bring raised on the property.

== See also ==
- National Register of Historic Places listings in Kennebec County, Maine
