= Woods–Gerry House =

Historic house in Rhode Island, United States

- U.S. National Register of Historic Places
- U.S. National Historic Landmark District – Contributing property
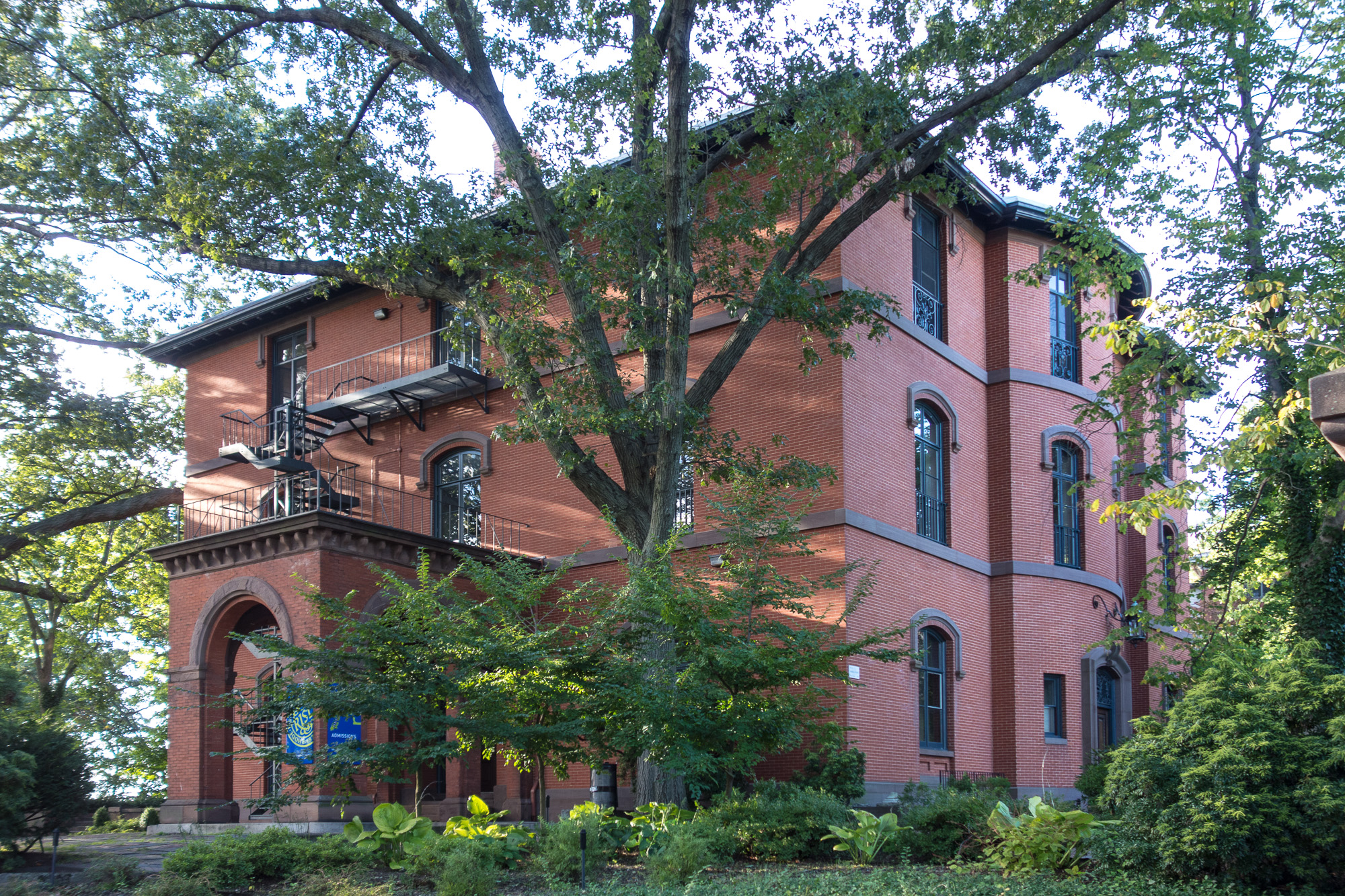

- Location within Rhode Island Location within the United States
- Location: Providence, Rhode Island
- Coordinates: 41°49′42″N 71°24′21″W
- Built: 1860
- Architect: Upjohn, Richard
- Architectural style: Italianate
- Part of: College Hill Historic District (ID70000019)
- NRHP reference No.: 71000003

Significant dates
- Added to NRHP: February 12, 1971
- Designated NHLDCP: November 10, 1970

The Woods–Gerry House (or Dr. Marshall Woods House) is an historic house on 62 Prospect Street in Providence, Rhode Island, United States. It is a large, three story brick structure, designed by Richard Upjohn and built in 1860 for Dr. and Mrs. Marshall Wood. It is the largest surviving 19th-century house in Providence, measuring 55 feet (17 m) in width and 75 feet (23 m) in depth. It features restrained Italianate styling, most evident in its porch and porte-cochere, and in its roofline. The building currently houses the Admissions office for the Rhode Island School of Design.

The house was listed on the National Register of Historic Places in 1971.

The first floor of the house now holds the Rhode Island School of Design’s main undergraduate exhibition space, the Woods-Gerry Gallery. The gallery uses the historic rooms for rotating shows: group exhibitions during fall semester and Wintersession, and weekly senior shows in the spring.

== Exhibitions ==
The Woods–Gerry Gallery hosts rotating exhibitions throughout the academic year featuring work by RISD students and alumni. Recent exhibitions have included the Senior Invitational (2024), featuring participating artists Jasem Alsanea, Hank Hurst, Mason Hunt, Dway Lunkad, Muhaddisa Ali, Jessie Fan, Adelaide Elkin, Hannah Rose Albinus, Jiawei Li, Zoe Lee, Joy Ham, Christie Sung, Yilina Yang, Reese Cowen, Sydney Cohn, Luca Varano, Taylor Mclaurin, Betelhem NAZ Abechu, Ashley Nguyen, Samuel Rampelt, James Dewanto, Marin Griffith, Dominich Cocuzza, Jean Yoo, Kara Lee, Lucinda Lansill, Milo Kosofsky, Cameron Lasson, Lizzy Finn, Isabela Chan, Valeria Lockwood, Yue Xu, Gene Suh, and Jiayi Huo.

== Gallery ==
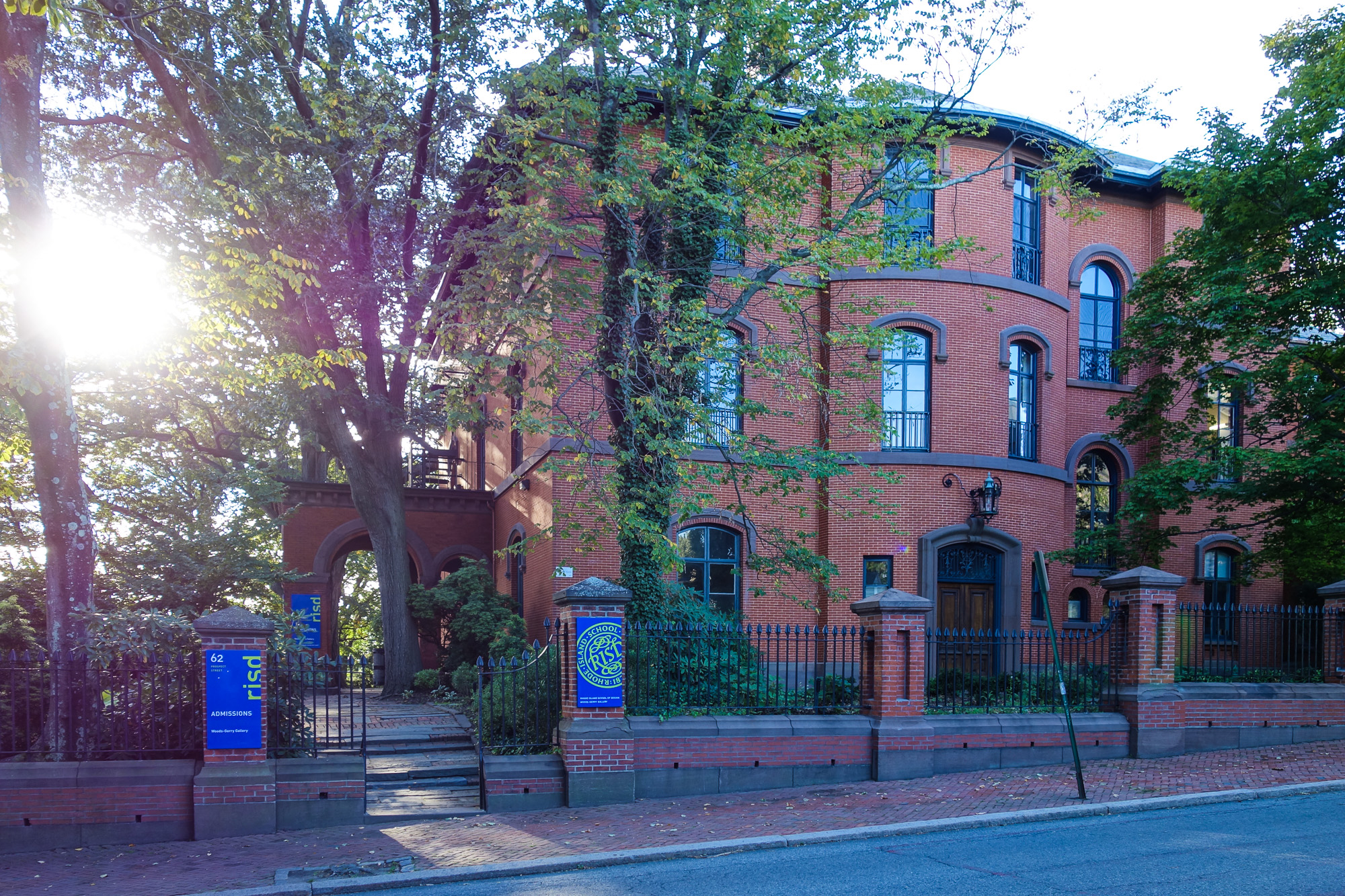
The house in 2012

== See also ==
- National Register of Historic Places listings in Providence, Rhode Island
