= Richard Upjohn =

English-American architect (1802–1878)

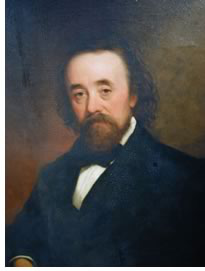
- Upjohn oil portrait circa 1870
- Born: 22 January 1802; Shaftesbury, England, UK
- Died: 16 August 1878 (aged 76); Garrison, Putnam County, New York, USA
- Occupation: Architect
- Buildings: William Rotch Jr. House; Oaklands; Kingscote; Church of the Ascension; Edward King House; St. Paul's Cathedral; Hamilton Hoppin House; Kenworthy Hall
- Projects: Trinity Church; Church of the Holy Communion; Lindenwald; Green-Wood Cemetery Gate

Richard Upjohn (22 January 1802 – 16 August 1878) was a British-American architect who immigrated to the United States and became most famous for his Gothic Revival churches. He was partially responsible for launching the movement to popularity in the United States. Upjohn also did extensive work in and helped to popularize the Italianate style. He was a founder and the first president of the American Institute of Architects. His son, Richard Michell Upjohn, (1828-1903), was also a well-known architect and served as a partner in his continued architectural firm in New York.

== Life and career ==
Richard Upjohn was born in Shaftesbury, England, where he was apprenticed to a builder and cabinet-maker. He eventually became a master-mechanic. He and his family immigrated to the United States in 1829. They initially settled in New Bedford, Massachusetts and then moved on to Boston in 1833, where he worked in architectural design. He became a naturalized citizen of the United States in 1836. His first major project was for the entrances to the Boston Common, the town's central park and his first church would be St. John's Episcopal Church in Bangor, Maine. He had relocated to New York City by 1839, where he worked on alterations to the famed Trinity Church on Wall Street in Lower Manhattan. The alterations were later abandoned and he was commissioned to design a new church, completed in 1846, and still extant today. He published his extremely influential book, "Upjohn's rural architecture: Designs, working drawings and specifications for a wooden church, and other rural structures", in 1852. The designs in this publication were widely used across the country by builders, with many examples remaining.

Upjohn, along with 13 other architects, co-founded the American Institute of Architects on February 23, 1857. He served as president of that organization from 1857 to 1876, being succeeded by Thomas Ustick Walter, fourth Architect of the Capitol. He went on the design many buildings in a variety of styles. He died at his home in Garrison, New York in 1878. Architectural drawings and papers by Upjohn and other family members are held by the Drawings and Archives Department of the Avery Architectural and Fine Arts Library at Columbia University, in New York City, also by the New York Public Library's Humanities and Social Sciences Library, in the Manuscripts and Archives division, and by the Library of Congress, Prints & Photographs Division on Capitol Hill in Washington, D.C.

He died on 16 August 1878 in Putnam County, New York of cerebral softening.

== Projects ==
Some of Upjohn's notable projects include:

=== Churches ===
- St. John's Episcopal Church in Bangor, Maine, (1835–36, burned 1911)
- Trinity Church in New York City, (1839–46)
- The Church of the Ascension in New York City, (1840–41)
- Christ Church in Cobble Hill, Brooklyn, New York, (1841–42)
- Bethesda Episcopal Church in Saratoga Springs, New York, (1842)
- St. Thomas Episcopal Church in Newark, Delaware, (ca. 1843)
- Grace Church in Providence, Rhode Island, (1845; with Cram, Goodhue & Ferguson)
- Church of the Holy Cross in Middletown, Rhode Island, (1845)
- Christ Church in Canaan, Connecticut, (1845–46)
- St. Paul's Episcopal Church in Brunswick, Maine, (1845)
- First Parish Church in Brunswick, Maine, (1845–46)
- Church of the Pilgrims (now Our Lady of Lebanon Maronite Cathedral) in Brooklyn Heights, Brooklyn, New York, (1846)
- St. Mary's Episcopal Church in Burlington, New Jersey, (1846–54)
- Christ Episcopal Church in Raleigh, North Carolina, (1846–48)
- St. Mary's Episcopal Church in Portsmouth, Rhode Island, (1847)
- St. Saviours Episcopal Church, in Maspeth, Queens, New York (1847)
- St. James Episcopal Church, in New London, Connecticut (1847)
- Grace Church in Newark, New Jersey, (1847–48)
- Grace Episcopal Church in Brooklyn, New York, (1847–49)
- All Saints' Episcopal Church in Briarcliff Manor, New York, (1848–54)
- Calvary Episcopal Church in Stonington, Connecticut, (consecrated 1849)
- St. Thomas Episcopal Church in Amenia Union, New York, (1849–51)
- St. Paul's Cathedral in Buffalo, New York, (1849–51)
- Zion Episcopal Church in Rome, New York, (1850–1851)
- St. Paul's Episcopal Church in Brookline, Massachusetts, (1850-52)
- Church of St. John in the Wilderness in Copake Falls, New York, (1852)
- St. John Chrysostom Church in Delafield, Wisconsin, (1851–56)
- Madison Square Presbyterian Church in New York City, (1854)
- Christ Church (Episcopal) in Binghamton, New York, (1853–1855)
- Old St. Paul's Episcopal Church in Baltimore, Maryland, (1854)
- All Saints Episcopal Church in Frederick, Maryland, (1855)
- St. Mary's Episcopal Chapel in Raleigh, North Carolina, (1855)
- St. James Episcopal Church in Muncy, Pennsylvania, (1856)
- Christ Episcopal Church in Marlboro, New York, (1858)
- St. Mark's Episcopal Church in San Antonio, Texas, (1858)
- Trinity Chapel in Far Rockaway, Queens, New York, (1858)
- St. Peter's Episcopal Church in Albany, New York, (1859)
- Church of the Holy Comforter in Poughkeepsie, New York, (1860)
- Trinity Episcopal Church in Woodbridge, New Jersey, (1860)
- St. Philip's Church in the Highlands in Garrison, New York, (1860–61)
- St. Stephen's Episcopal Church in Providence, Rhode Island, (1860–62)
- Memorial Church of St. Luke The Beloved Physician in Philadelphia, Pennsylvania, (1861)
- Trinity-St. Paul's Episcopal Church in New Rochelle, New York, (1862)
- St. John's Chapel at Hobart College in Geneva, New York, (1863)
- All Saint's Memorial Church in Navesink, New Jersey, (1863–64)
- Christ Church Riverdale in The Bronx, New York, (1866)
- Immanuel Episcopal Church in Bellows Falls, Vermont, (1863–67)
- St. Peter's Episcopal Church in Geneva, New York, (1868)
- Church of the Covenant in Boston, Massachusetts, (1865–1867)
- St. Luke's Episcopal Church in Scranton, Pennsylvania, (1867)
- St. Mark's Episcopal Church in Jim Thorpe, Pennsylvania, (1867)
- Christ Church Episcopal in Fitchburg, Massachusetts, (1867)
- Chapel of St. John Chrysostom, New York City, Chapel of Trinity Church, Wall Street (1868 commission)
- St. Thomas Episcopal Church in New York City, (1870, burned 1905)
- St. Paul's Episcopal Church in Selma, Alabama, (1871–75)
- Cast-iron railing fence design in Boston Common, Boston, Massachusetts
- North Gate Screen (1860s) and the Pierrepont family tomb (c. 1860) in Green-Wood Cemetery, Brooklyn, New York
- St. Mark's Cathedral in Salt Lake City, Utah, (1870)
- Trinity Church in Princeton, New Jersey, (1870)
- Rye Presbyterian Church in Rye, New York, (1870)
- Grace Church/St. Agnes-by-the-Lake in Algoma, Wisconsin, (1879, burned 1884, replica constructed 1891)
- Trinity Episcopal Church in Litchfield, Minnesota, (1871), attributed
- Trinity Episcopal Church in Iowa City, Iowa, (1871), attributed
- Church of the Good Shepherd in Blue Earth, Minnesota, (1871–72), attributed

=== Residences ===
- William Rotch Jr. House in New Bedford, Massachusetts, (1834)
- Oaklands in Gardiner, Maine (1835)
- Kingscote in Newport, Rhode Island, (1839)
- Theodore Lyman House in Brookline, Massachusetts (1844–46)
- Edward King House in Newport, Rhode Island, (1845–47)
- 70–72 Mount Vernon Street in Boston, Massachusetts, (1847–1848)
- Lindenwald in Kinderhook, New York, (1849)
- James and Mary Forsyth House in Kingston, New York, (1849–50)
- W. W. Fairbanks House in Taunton, Massachusetts (1852)
- Charles H. Russell House, "Oaklawn," in Newport, Rhode Island (1852–53)
- The Grove in Cold Spring, New York, (1852–53)
- Rock Lawn in Garrison, New York (1852–53)
- Woodlawn in Garrison, New York (1854)
- Hamilton Hoppin House in Middletown, Rhode Island (1856)
- Henry E. Pierrepont House in Brooklyn, New York (1856–57)
- Kenworthy Hall in Marion, Alabama, (1858–60)
- Marshall Woods House in Providence, Rhode Island (1860–61)

=== Civic Buildings ===
- Abiel Smith School in Boston, Massachusetts, (1835)
- Bristol Academy in Taunton, Massachusetts, (1852)
- Dorchester County Courthouse and Jail in Cambridge, Maryland, (1853)
- Corn Exchange Bank in New York, New York (1854)
- Edwin A. Stevens Hall in Hoboken, New Jersey, (1870)

== Gallery ==
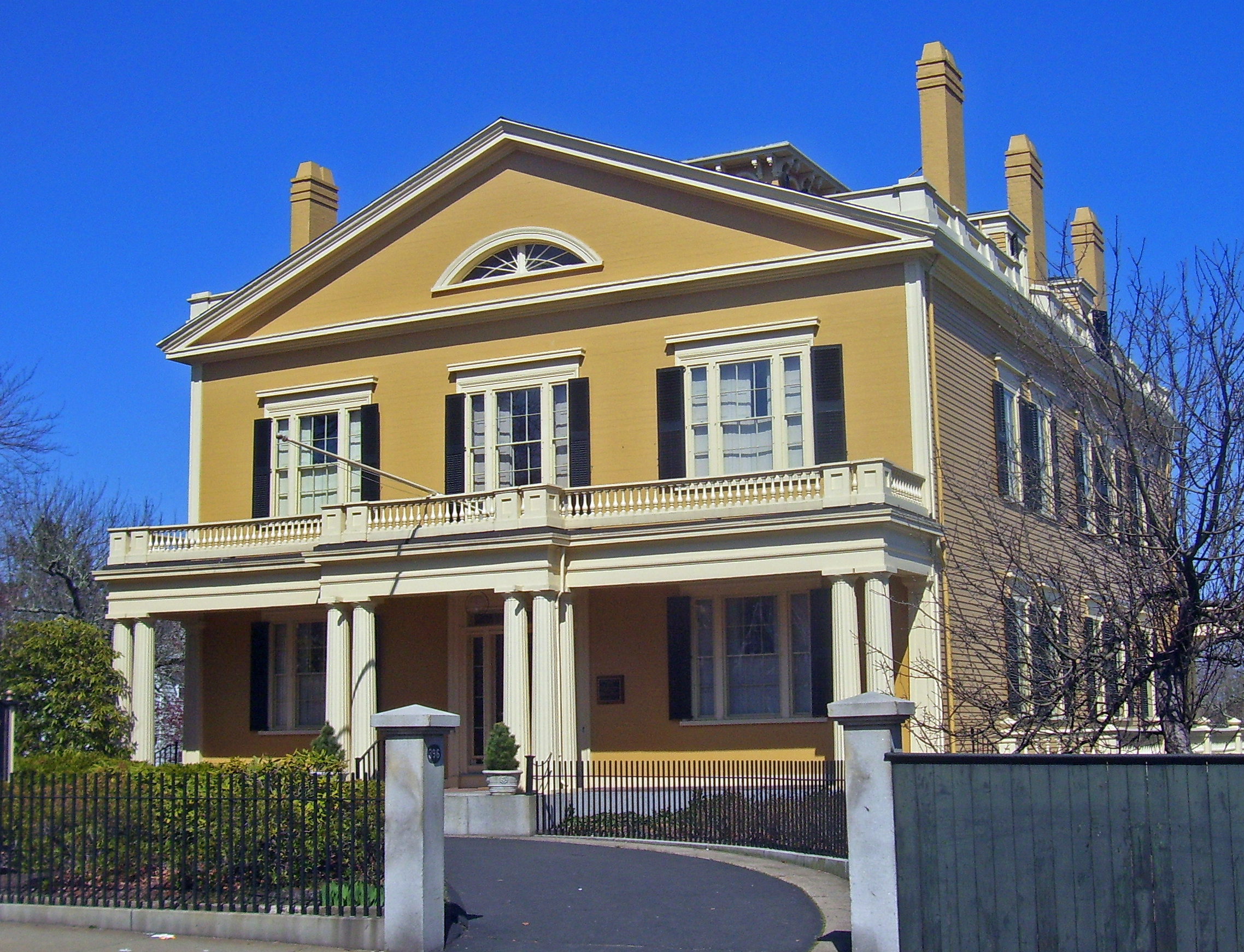
William Rotch Jr. House, New Bedford, MA, (1834)

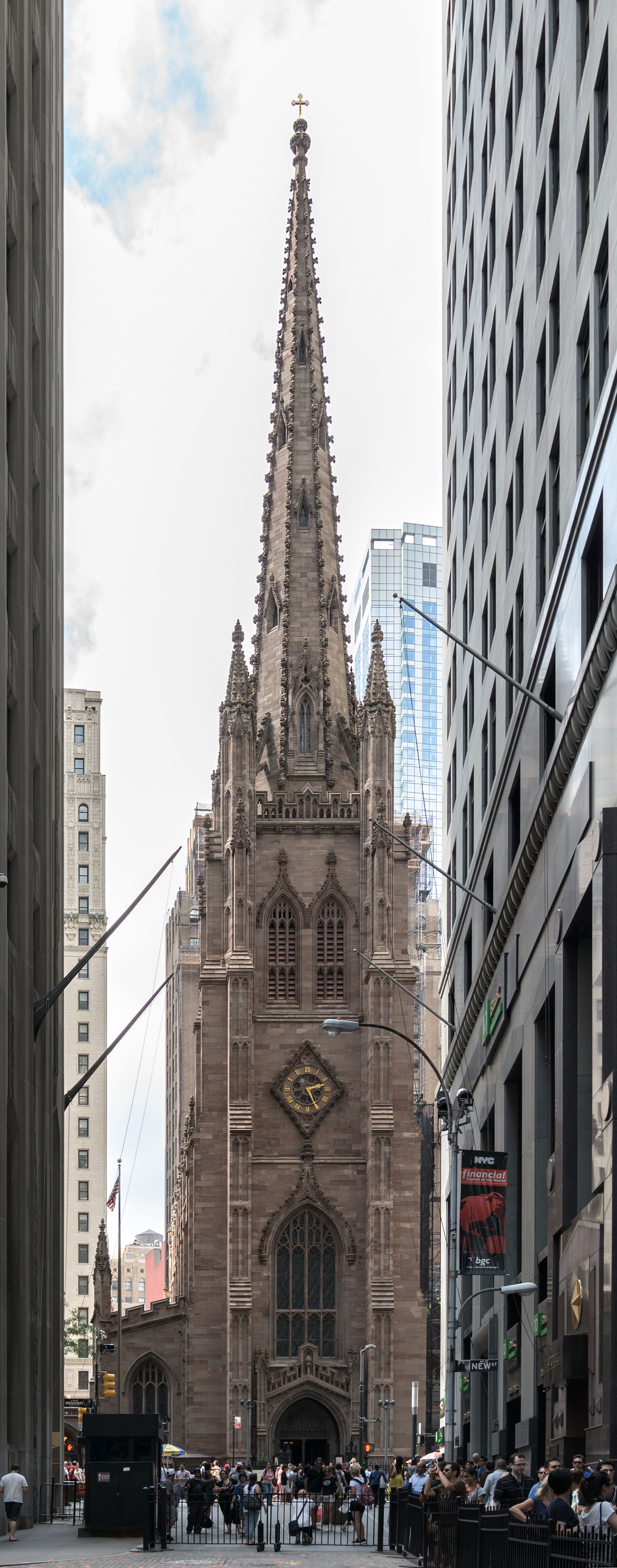
Trinity Church, New York City, (1839–46)

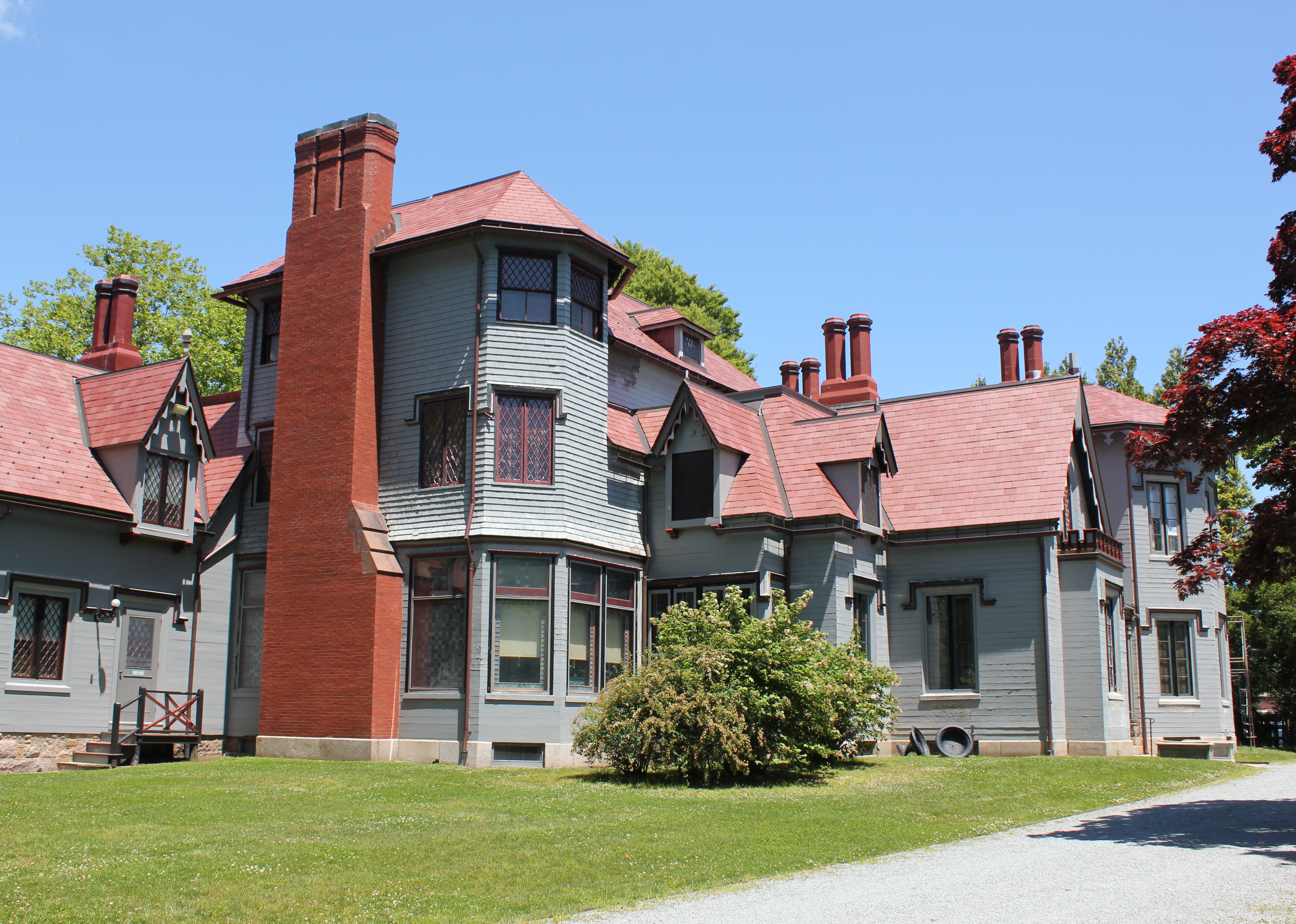
Kingscote, Newport, RI, (1839)

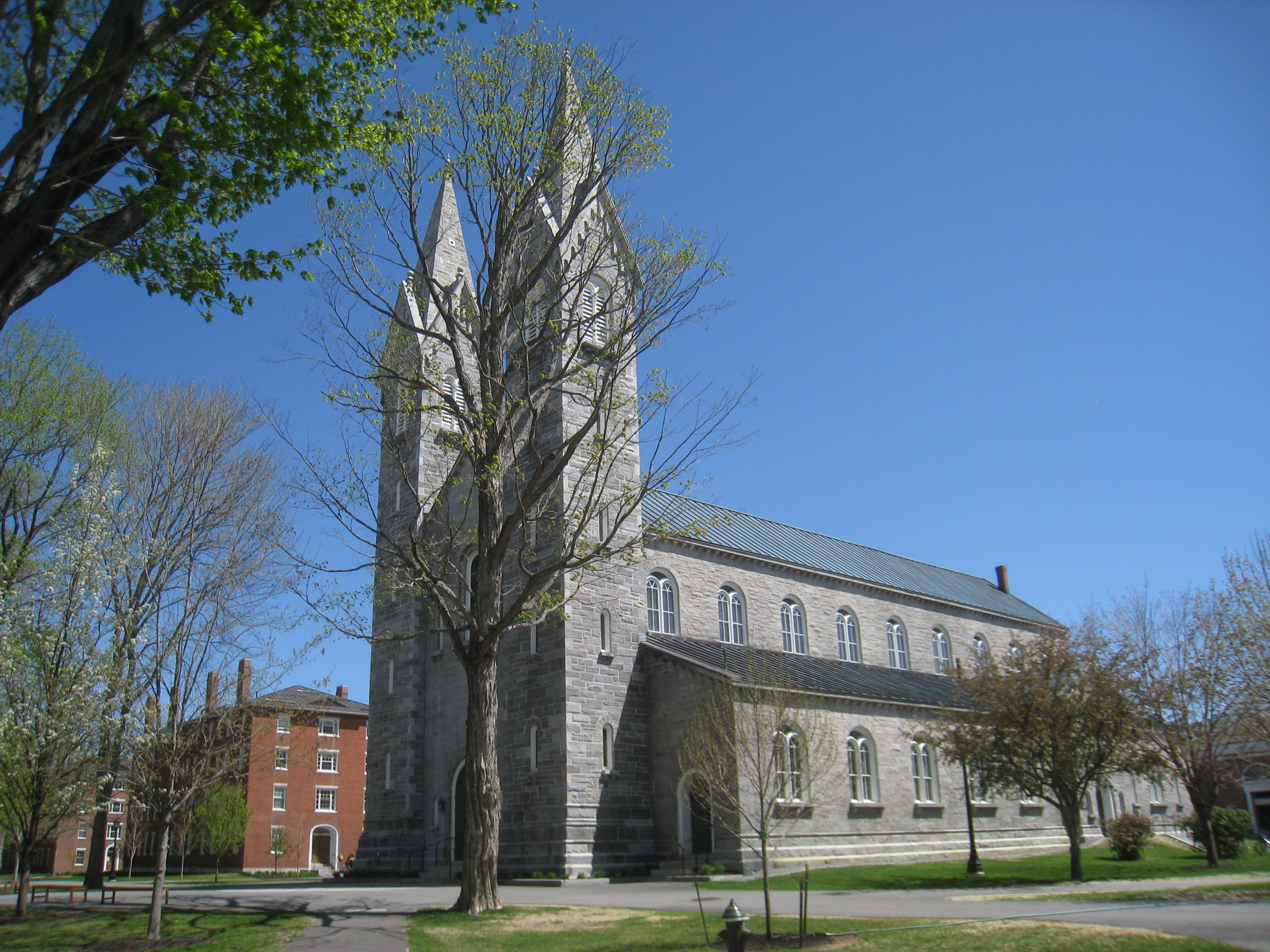
Bowdoin College Chapel, Brunswick, ME, (1844-1855)

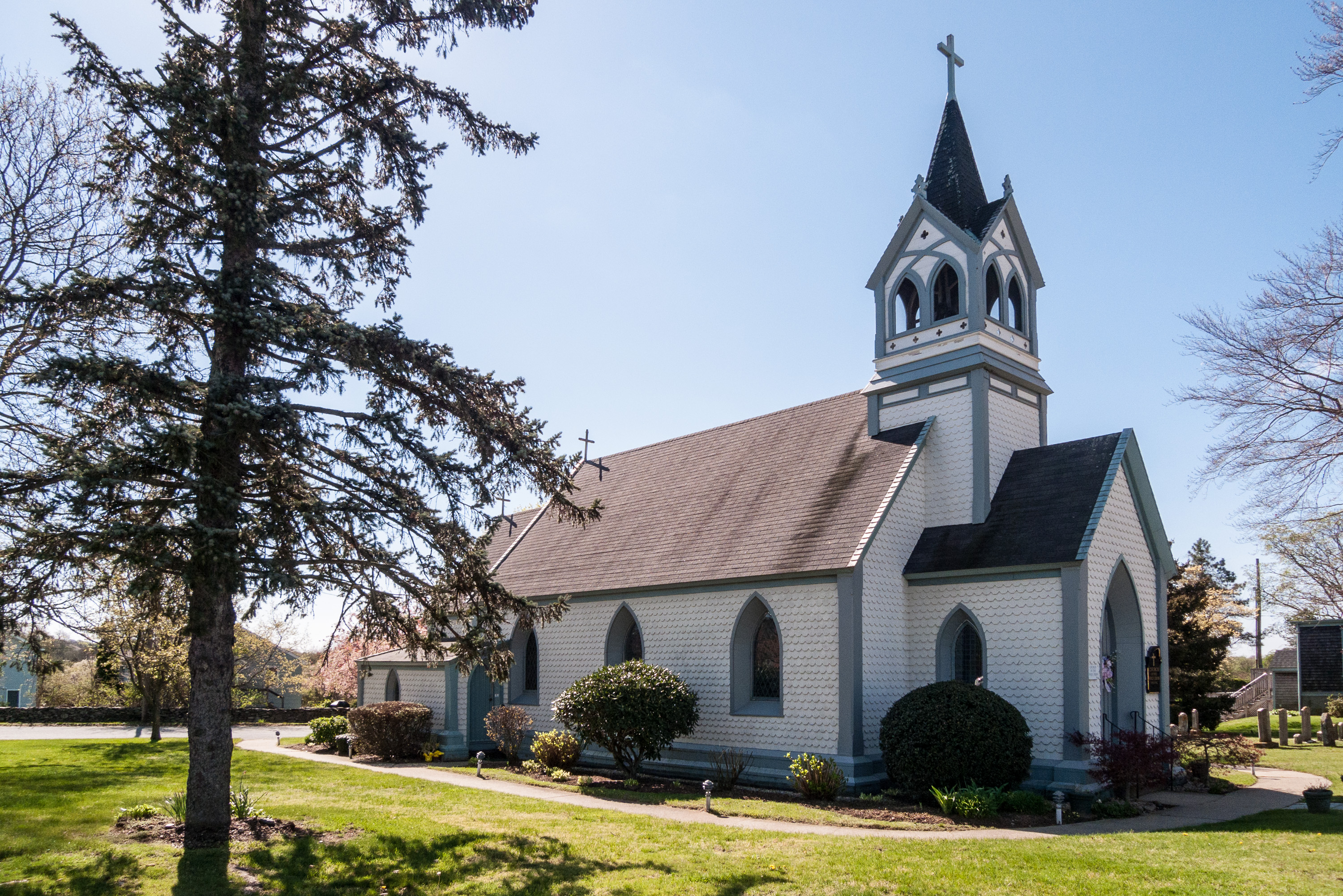
Church of the Holy Cross, Middletown, RI, (1844)

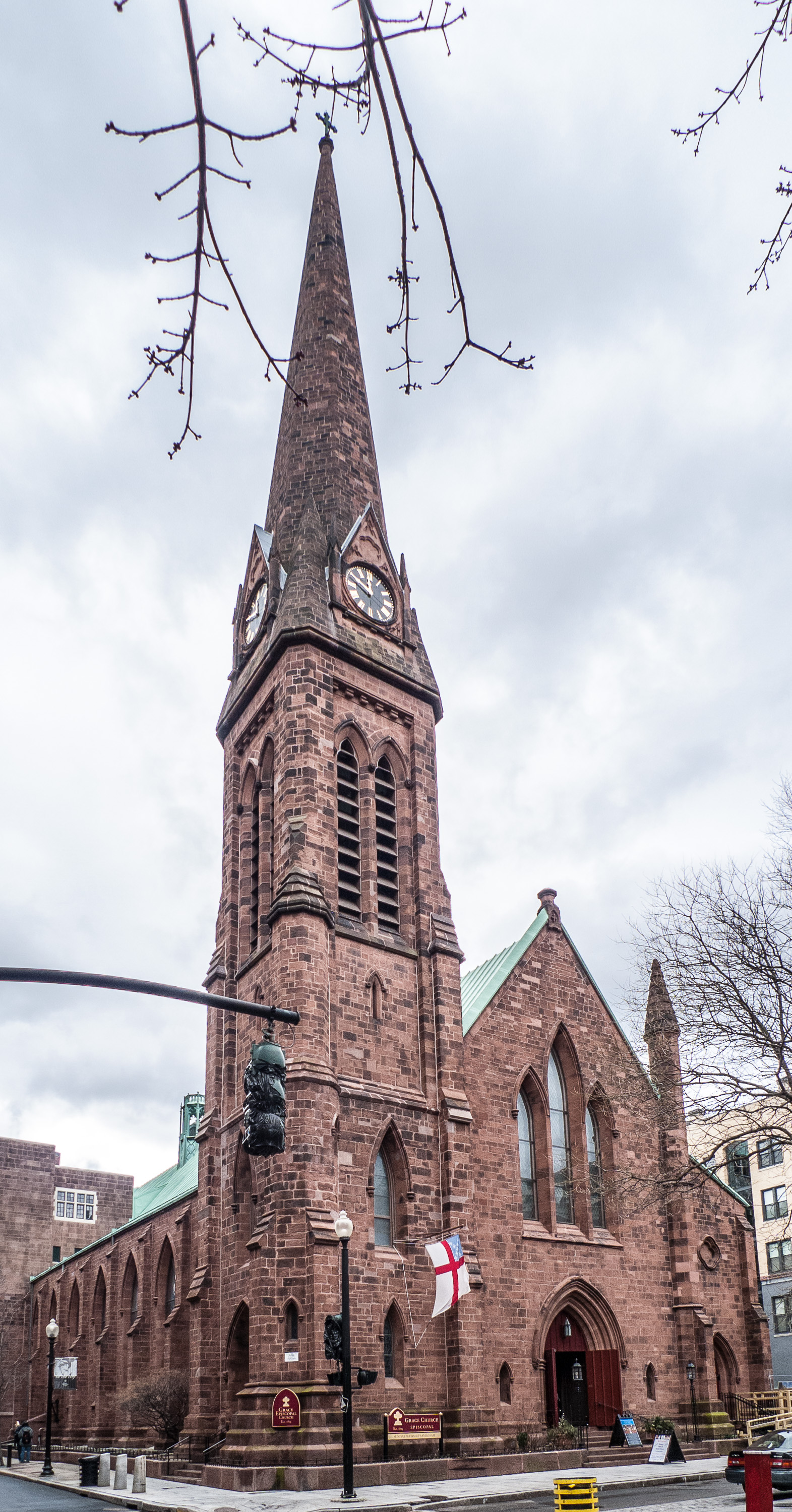
Grace Church, Providence, RI, (1845)

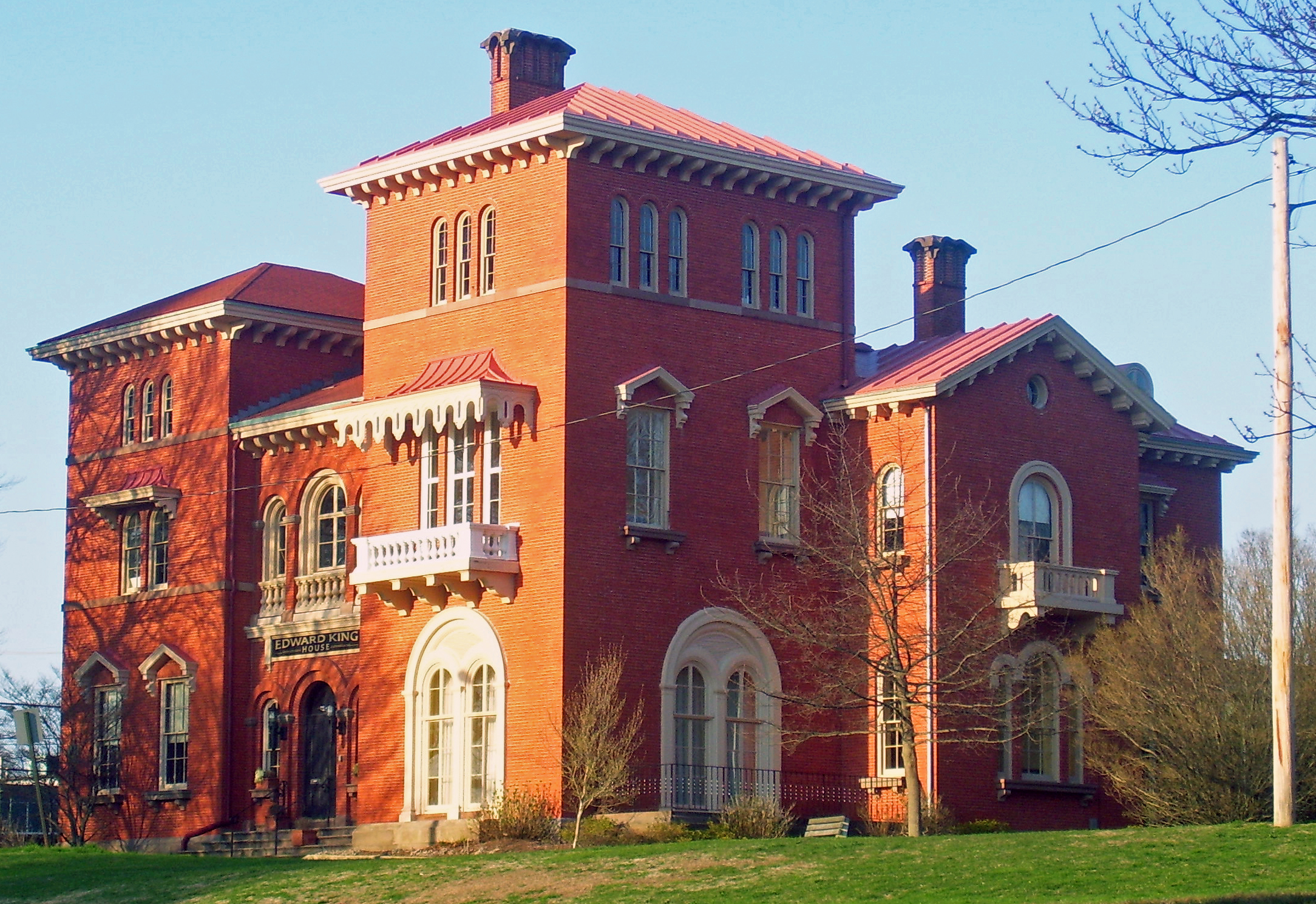
Edward King House, Newport, RI, (1845-47)

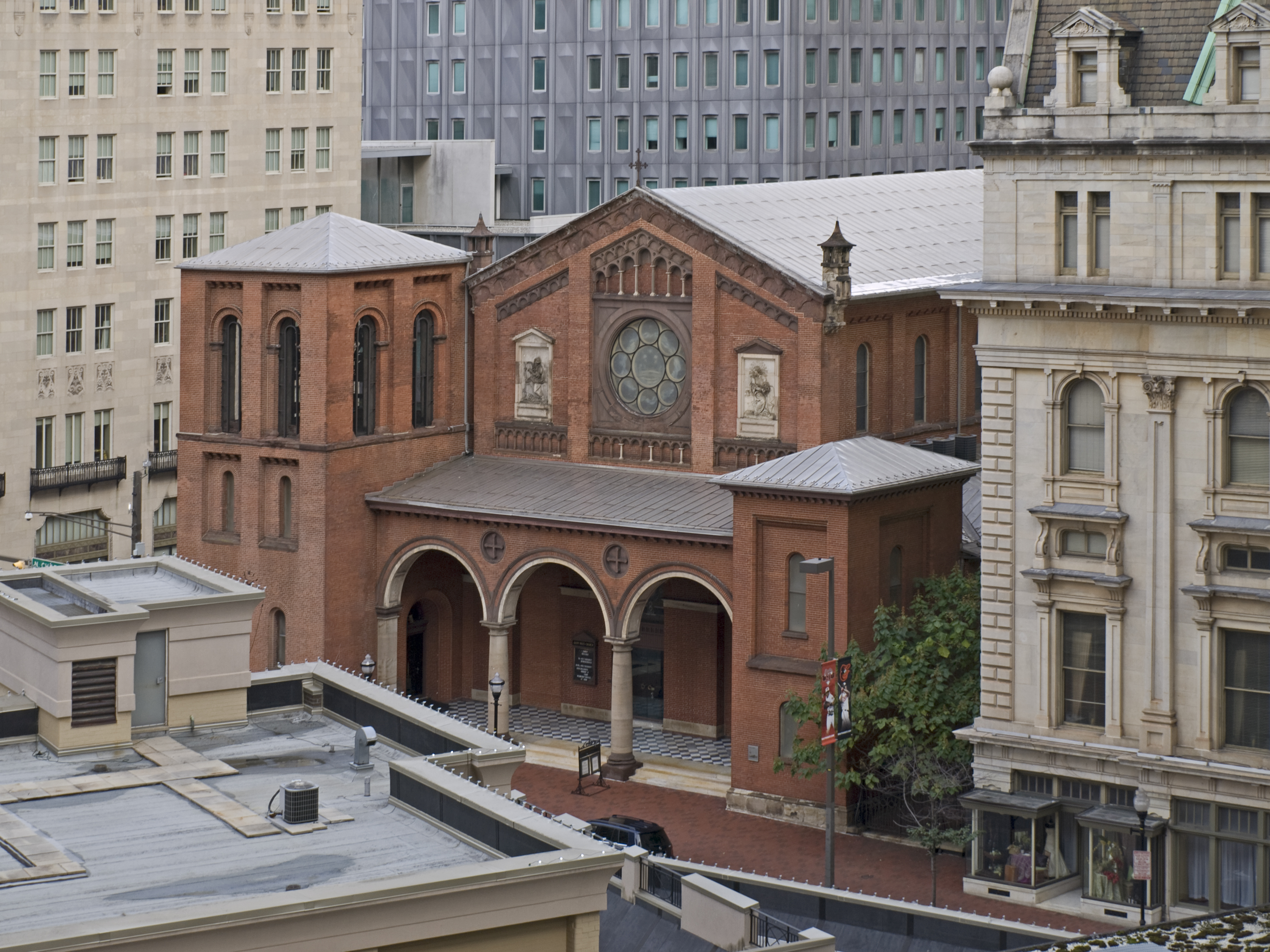
Old St. Paul's Church, Baltimore, (1854)

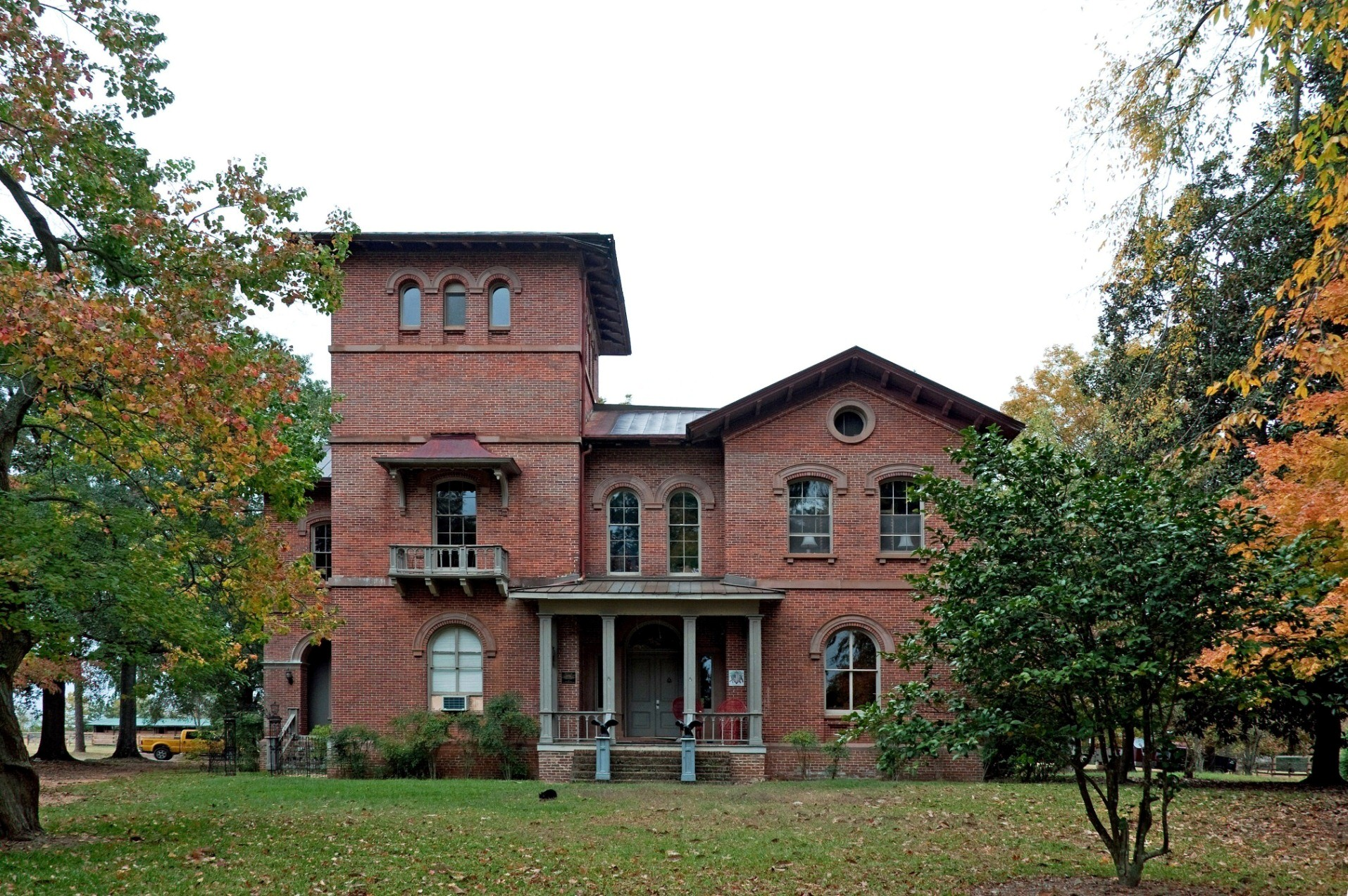
Kenworthy Hall, Perry County, AL, (1858–60)

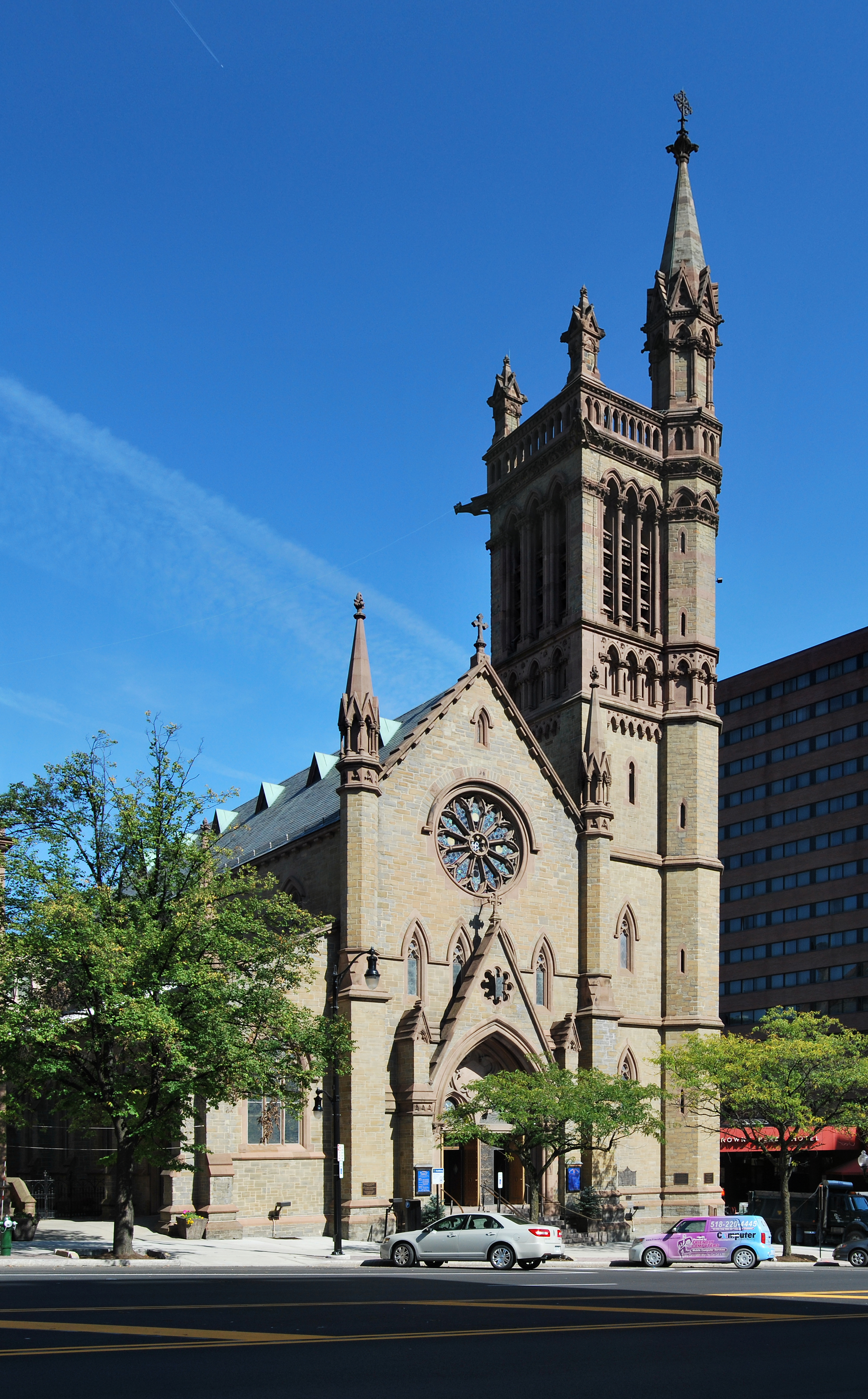
St. Peter's Episcopal Church, Albany, NY, (1859–60)

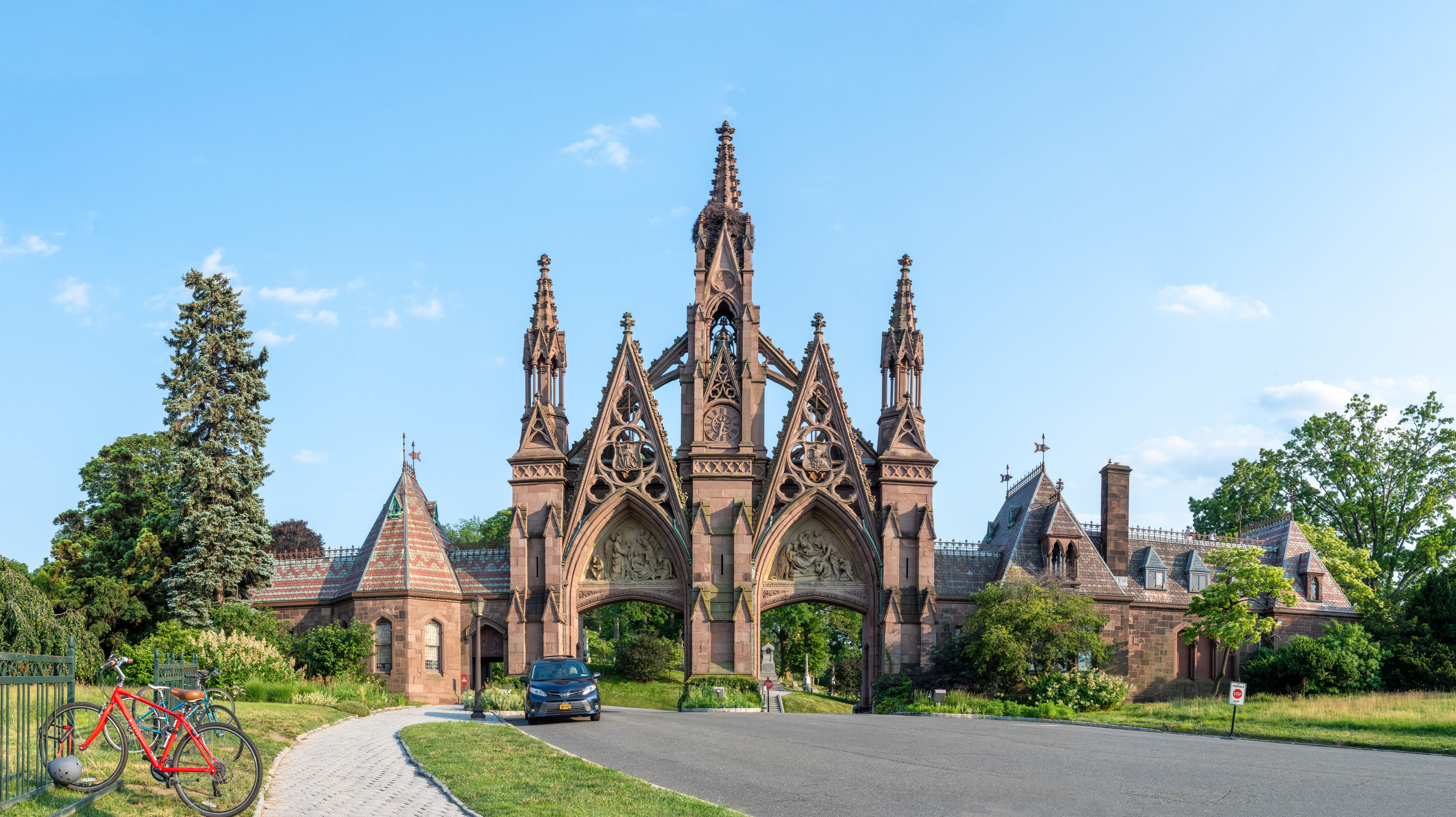
Screen, Green-Wood Cemetery (1860s)

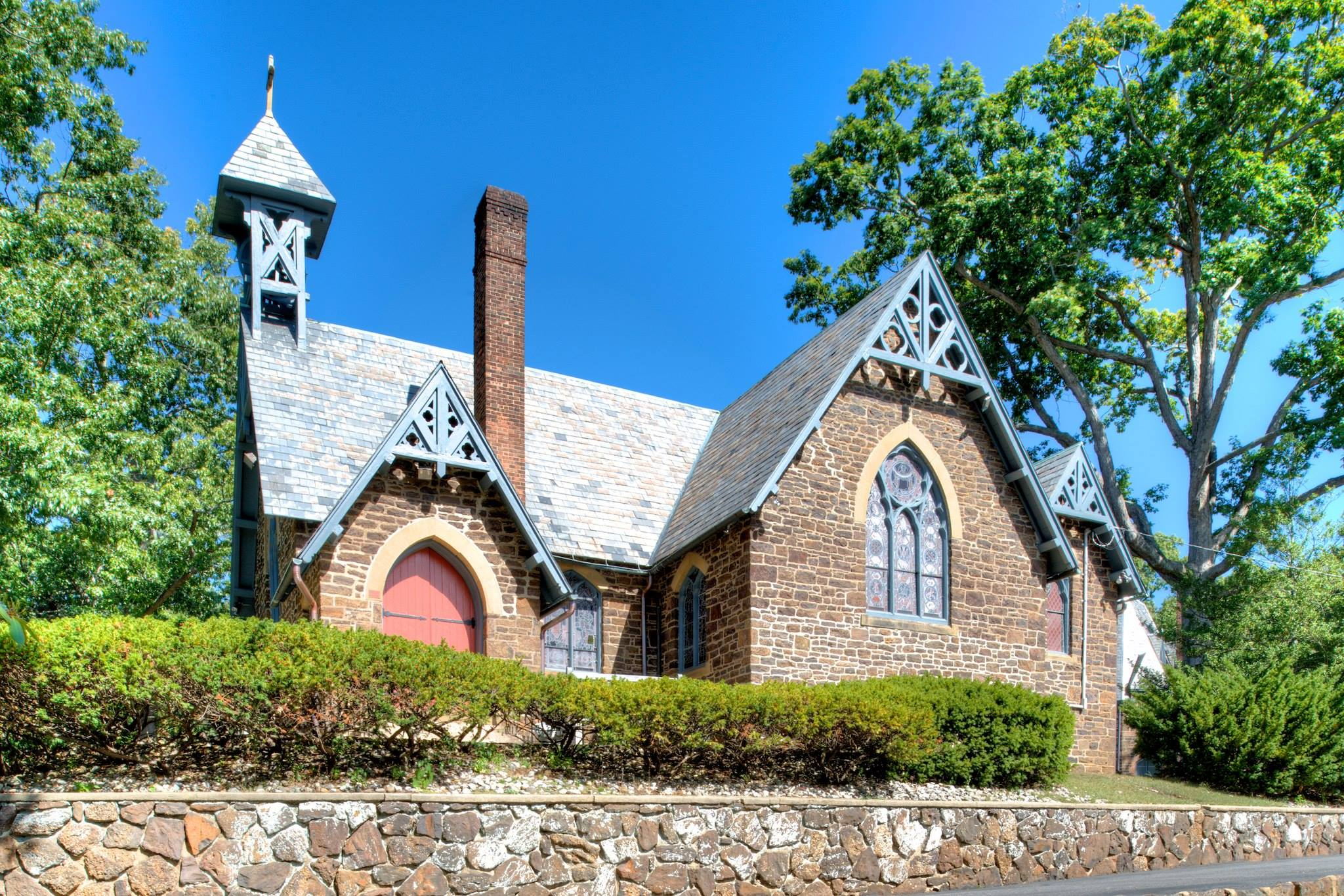
All Saint's Memorial Church, Navesink, NJ, (1863–64)

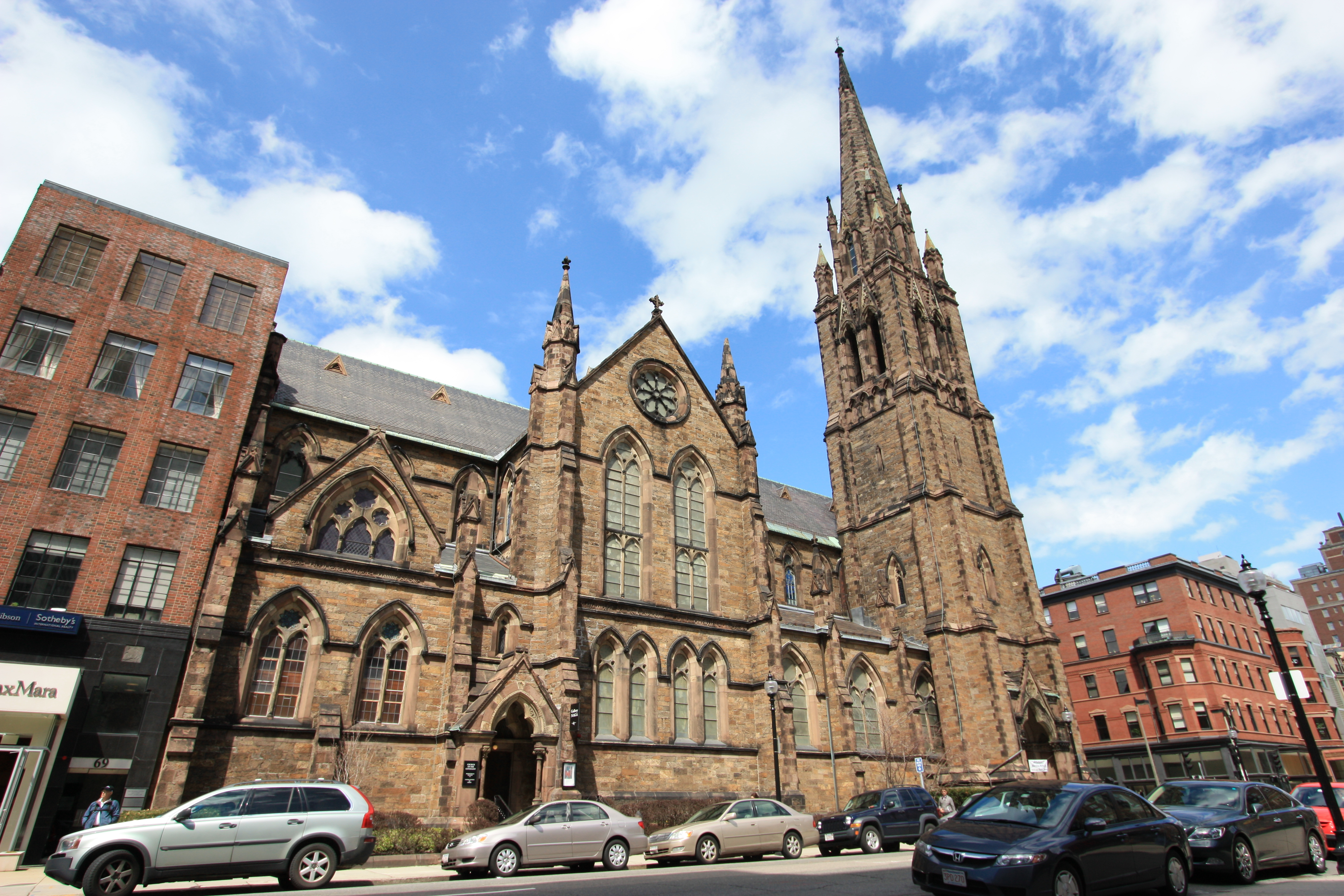
Church of the Covenant, Boston, (1865–67)

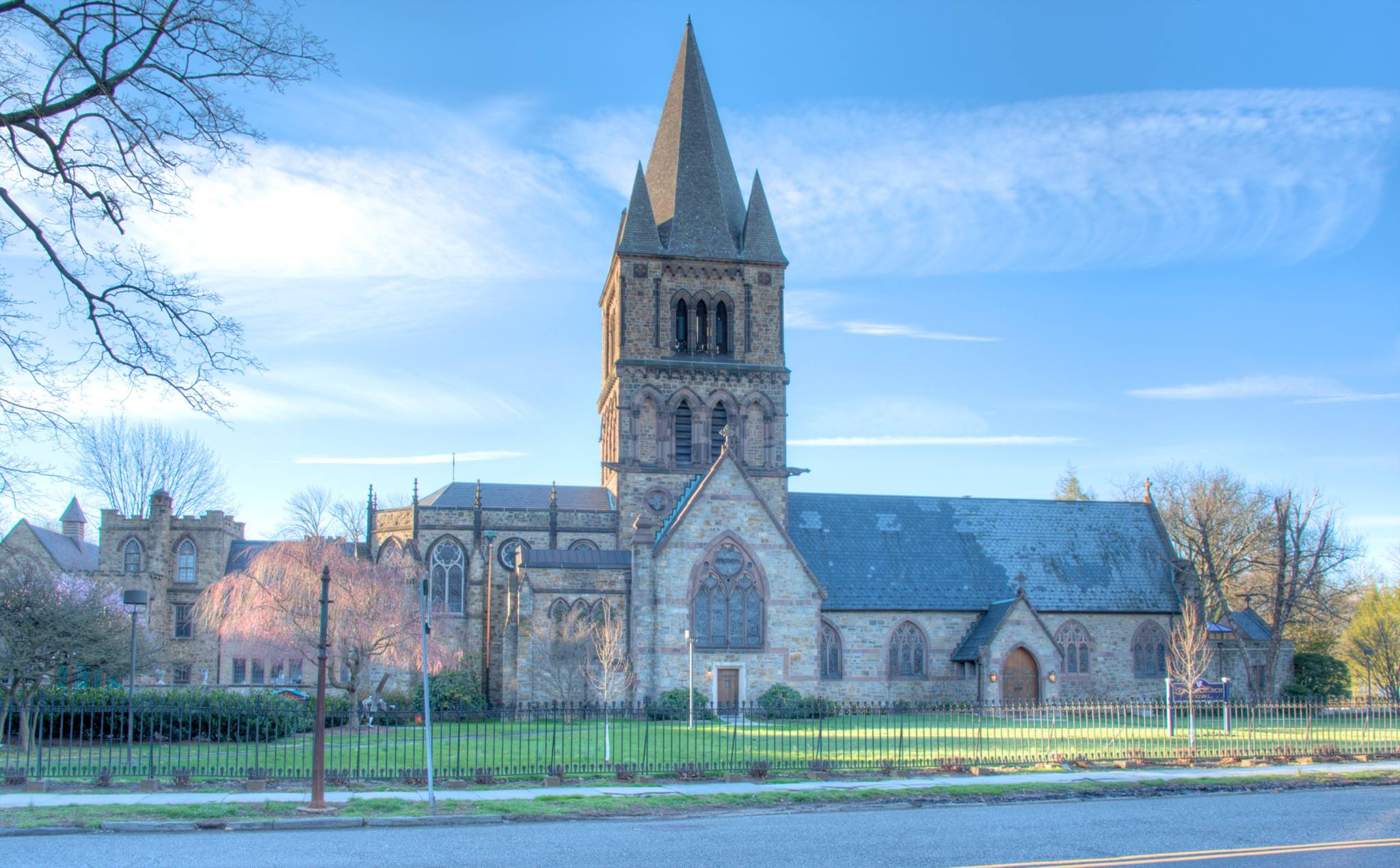
Trinity Church, Princeton NJ, (1870, altered)

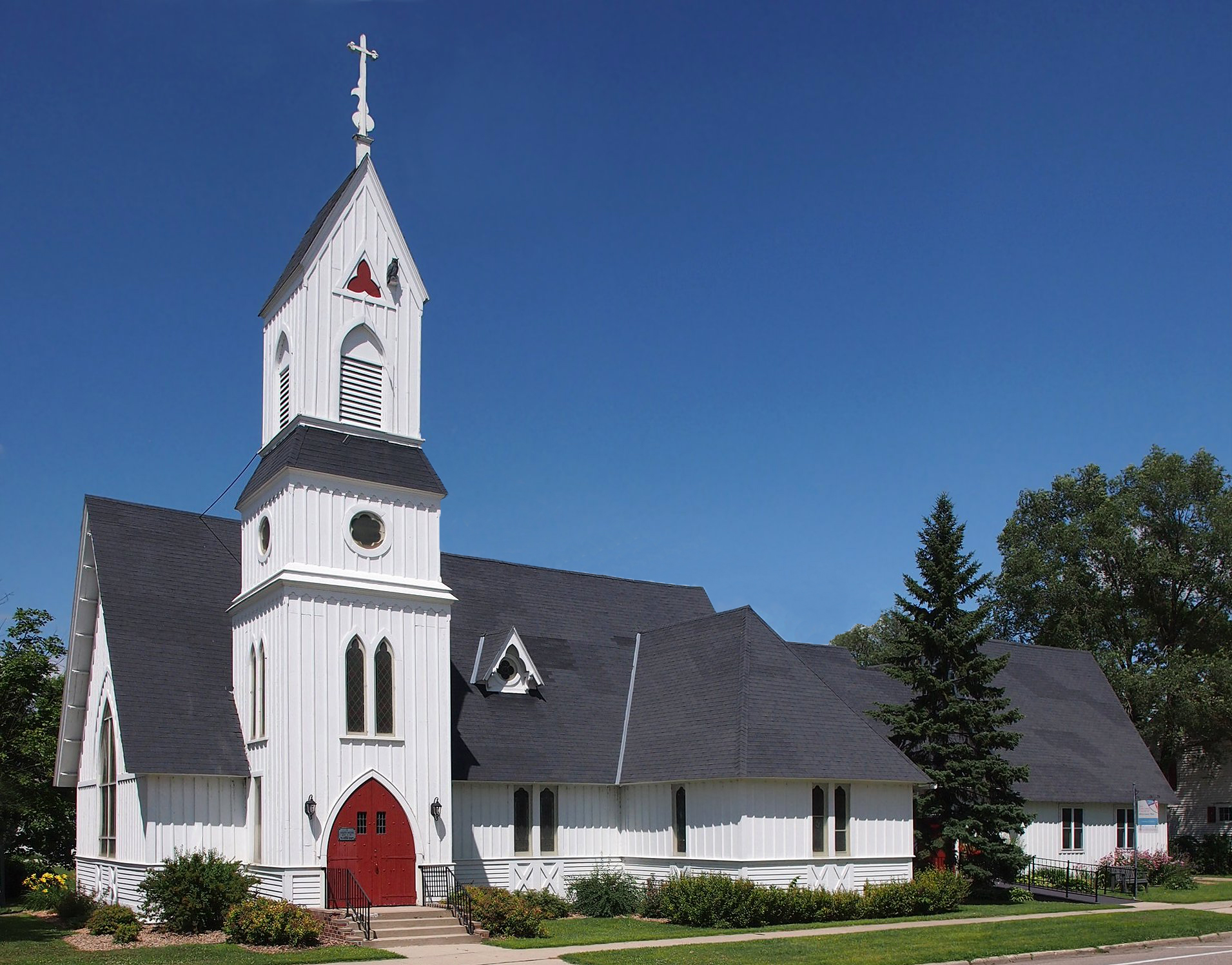
Trinity Episcopal Church, Litchfield, MN, (1871, attributed)
