= Christ Church (Binghamton, New York) =

Historic church in New York, United States

- U.S. National Register of Historic Places
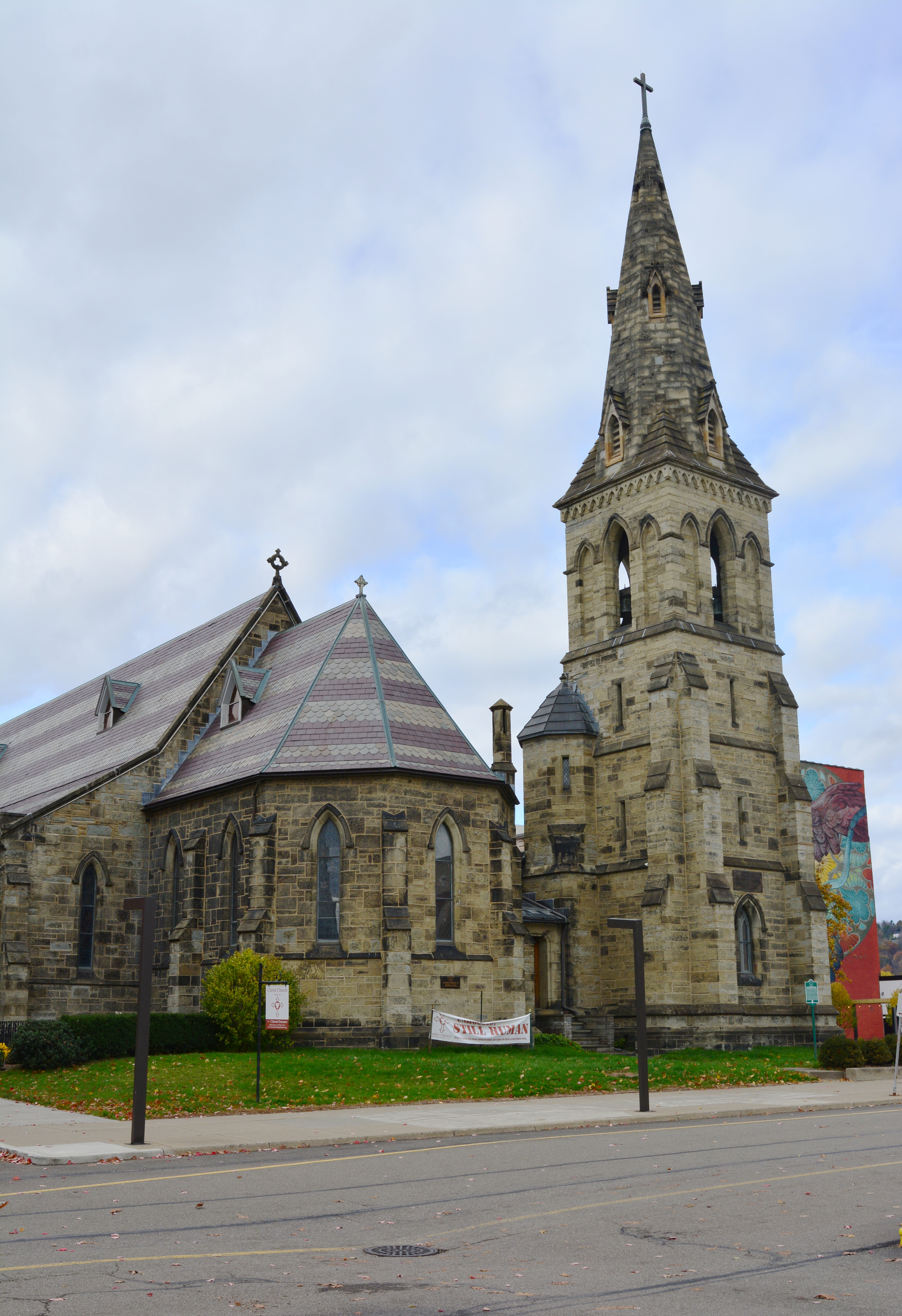
- Christ Church in 2025

- Location within New York Location within the United States
- Location: Corner of Washington and Henry Streets, Broome County, Binghamton, New York
- Coordinates: 42°6′1″N 75°54′50″W
- Area: 1.5 acres (0.61 ha)
- Built: 1853
- Architect: Upjohn, Richard, (1802-1878); Wells, J. Stuart
- Architectural style: Gothic
- NRHP reference No.: 74001221
- Added to NRHP: December 02, 1974

Christ Church is a historic Episcopal church located at Binghamton in Broome County, New York. It is a one-story bluestone structure with Gothic Revival elements. The church consists of a rectangular central section housing the nave and aisles, an apse and bell tower on the east facade, and side entrances through transepts on the north and south elevations. It was built between 1853 and 1855 and was designed by noted church architect Richard Upjohn, (1802-1878).

It was listed on the National Register of Historic Places maintained by the U.S. Department of the Interior's National Park Service in 1974.
