= Trinity Episcopal Church (Litchfield, Minnesota) =

Historic church in Minnesota, United States

- U.S. National Register of Historic Places
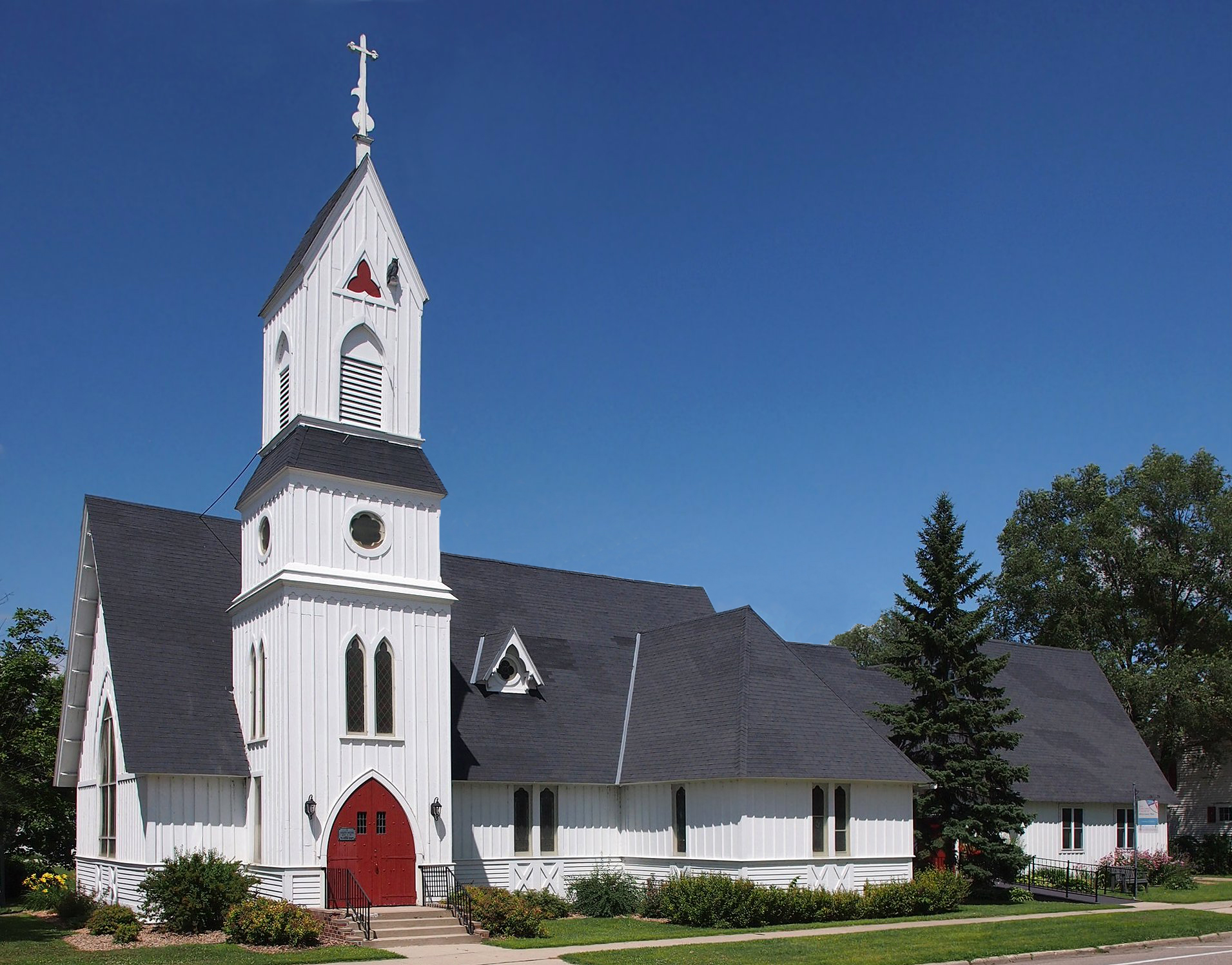
- Trinity Episcopal Church from the south-southwest

- Location within Minnesota Location within the United States
- Location: 3 East 4th Street, Litchfield, Minnesota
- Coordinates: 45°7′48″N 94°31′40″W
- Area: Less than one acre
- Built: 1871
- Architect: Richard Upjohn?
- Architectural style: Carpenter Gothic
- NRHP reference No.: 75000996
- Added to NRHP: June 20, 1975

Trinity Episcopal Church is an Episcopal church in Litchfield, Minnesota, United States, built in 1871 in Carpenter Gothic style. It has been attributed to the noted New York architect Richard Upjohn. It was listed on the National Register of Historic Places in 1975 for having local significance in the theme of architecture. It was nominated as a superlative example of Carpenter Gothic design from the mid-19th century.

== Description ==
As originally constructed in 1871, Trinity Episcopal Church consisted of the nave and chancel, plus a transept and vestry on the north. Immediately to the east was a freestanding church hall used for the parish school. Both buildings were constructed at the same time, along with a rectory a block and a half to the west. The gap between the church and hall was later filled in, creating a single 120-foot-long (37 m) structure. The three-story bell tower and south transept are also later additions.

The building's board and batten walls were a signature of Episcopal churches from the 1850s to the 1870s. On the Trinity Episcopal Church, though, the exterior walls are highly embellished with wainscoting below a horizontal band at the height of the window sills. Directly below each window is a decorative panel of crossed boards. These elements are not found on the parish hall, indicating it was not designed by the same architect. The church's lancet windows and door and side-entry bell tower are typical of Carpenter Gothic architecture.

The church's original pine furnishings were replaced in the 1950s. However very similar furnishings can be seen in the contemporaneous St. Mark's Episcopal Chapel near Annandale, Minnesota.

== Architect ==
Historical documents do not record who the architect was for the church building. It is believed to have been designed by prominent architect Richard Upjohn of New York City, famous for his Gothic Revival churches. Upjohn had a plausible connection to the project, given that the construction funds were largely donated by Upjohn's famous Trinity Church in Manhattan and he had designed the Brooklyn home of the family after whom Litchfield was named. The building's grace and sophistication indicate that Trinity Episcopal Church was indeed one of Upjohn's last works. Additionally, the original rectory resembles the architect's own home in Garrison, New York, though perhaps coincidentally.

== Current use ==
Trinity Episcopal Church is an active parish in the Episcopal Diocese of Minnesota. As of 2021, the parish is served by several diocesan priests and a local priest-in-charge. The original rectory a short distance away has since become a private residence.

In 2015, the church reported 30 members; in 2023, it reported 23 members. No membership statistics were reported in 2024 national parochial reports. Plate and pledge financial support reported by the church in 2024 was $21,955. Average Sunday Attendance (ASA) reported in 2024 was 10 persons. This was a relative decrease from ASA of 17 reported in 2021.

== See also ==
- List of Anglican churches
- National Register of Historic Places listings in Meeker County, Minnesota
