= St. Paul's Episcopal Church (Brunswick, Maine) =

Historic church in Maine, United States

- U.S. National Register of Historic Places
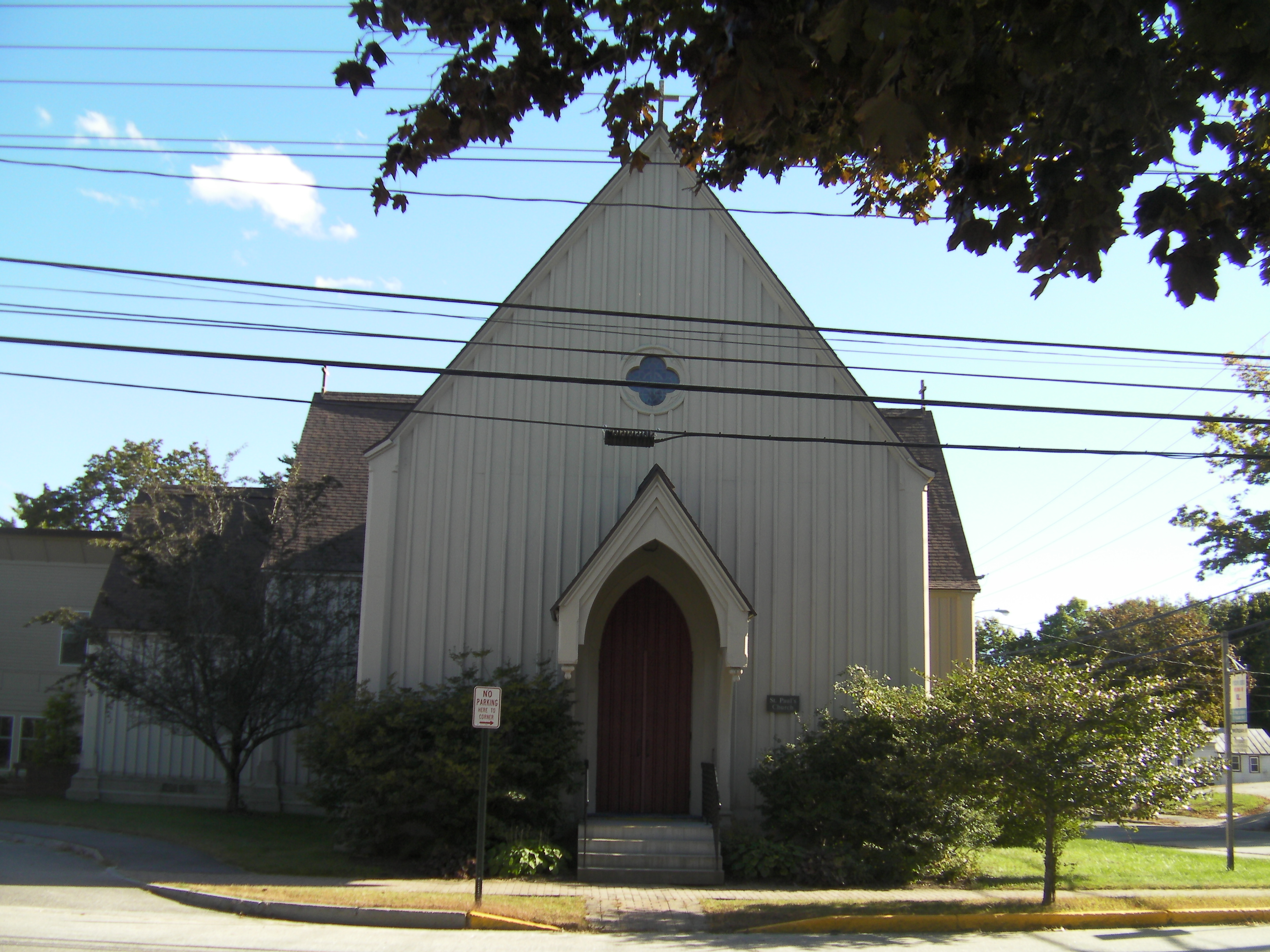

- Location within Maine Location within the United States
- Location: 27 Pleasant St., Brunswick, Maine
- Coordinates: 43°54′49″N 69°58′6″W
- Area: 1 acre (0.40 ha)
- Built: 1845
- Architect: Richard Upjohn
- Architectural style: Gothic Revival
- NRHP reference No.: 78000177
- Added to NRHP: January 31, 1978

St. Paul's Episcopal Church is a historic church at 27 Pleasant Street in Brunswick, Maine. Built in 1845, it is a distinctive early example of a modest Carpenter Gothic design by Richard Upjohn, then already well known for his larger-scale Gothic churches. The building was listed on the National Register of Historic Places in 1978. The rector is the Rev. Dr. Matthew R. Scott.

The church reported 653 members in 2015 and 611 members in 2023; no membership statistics were reported in 2024 parochial reports. Plate and pledge income reported for the congregation in 2024 was $464,791. Average Sunday attendance (ASA) in 2024 was 116 persons.

== Architecture ==
St. Paul's is located two blocks west of Brunswick's Maine Street downtown area, at the southeast corner of Pleasant and Union Streets. The church is a modest cruciform structure, built out of wood and finished in vertical board-and-batten siding. It is covered by a gabled roof, and diverges from standard plans published by Upjohn in that it has no tower, and that it has transepts, which were not present in plans found in his 1852 Upjohn's Rural Architecture guide. It has lancet-arched Gothic windows on the sides, and the entrance, at the west end, is set in a lancet-arched opening sheltered by a bracketed hood. Each of the gable ends has a small oculus window in the gable.

The Brunswick Episcopal congregation was organized in 1844, and was the third established in the state of Maine. This church, built in 1845, was designed by Richard Upjohn, who had already achieved national notice through the construction of Trinity Church in Manhattan (1841, now a National Historic Landmark), and St. John's Episcopal Church in Bangor (1839, burned 1911). Upjohn's fame brought much business, including for smaller and less well-to-do parishes, leading to his publication in 1852 of Upjohn's Rural Architecture. This church is a clear precursor of the designs published there, which were later widely used.

== See also ==
- National Register of Historic Places listings in Cumberland County, Maine
