= James and Mary Forsyth House =

Historic house in New York, United States

- U.S. National Register of Historic Places
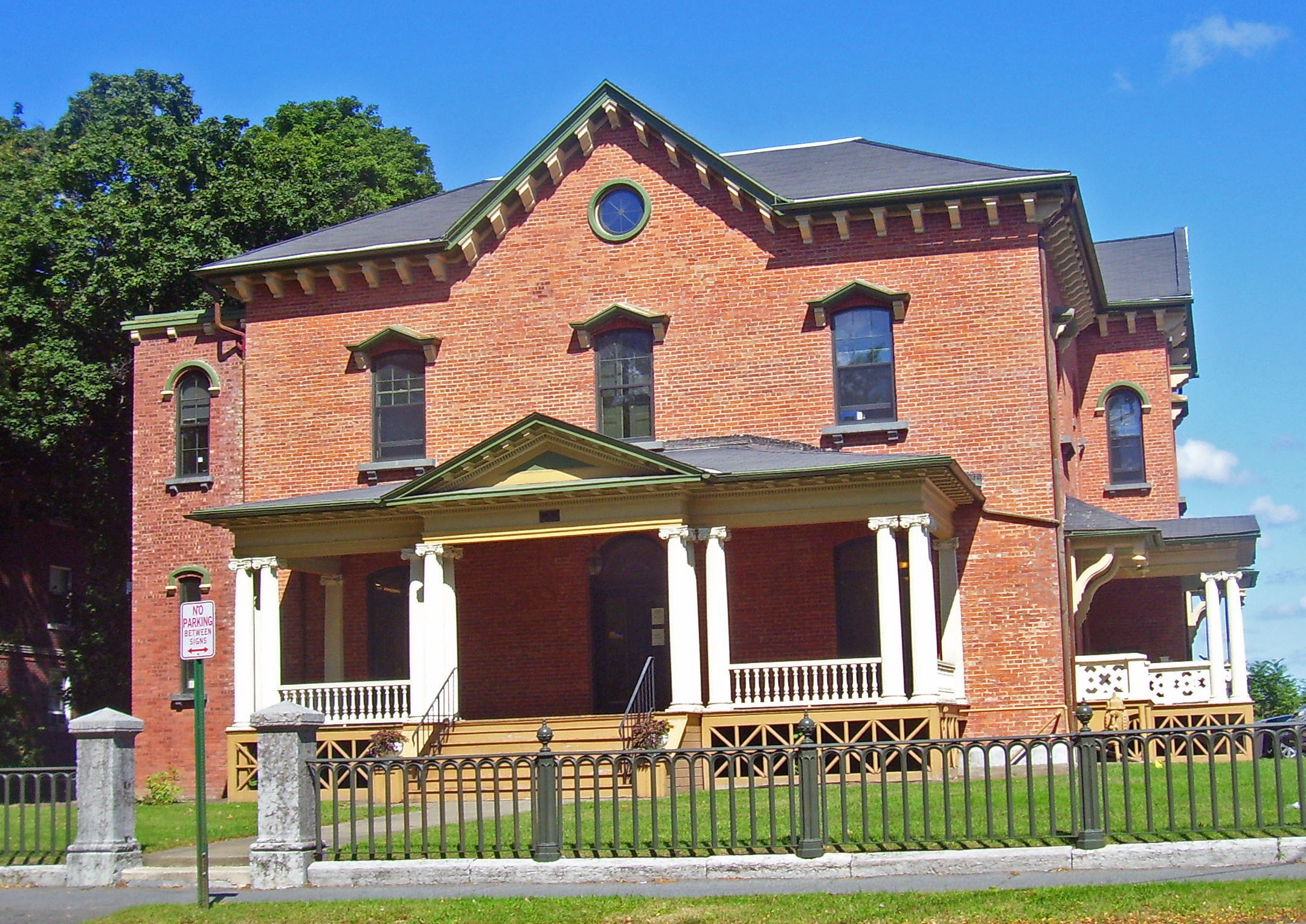
- South elevation, 2008

- Location within New York Location within the United States
- Interactive map showing James and Mary Forsyth’s House location
- Location: Kingston, NY
- Coordinates: 41°55′58″N 74°0′51″W
- Area: 3.3 acres (1.3 ha)
- Built: 1849–50
- Architect: Richard Upjohn
- Architectural style: Italian villa
- NRHP reference No.: 03000603
- Added to NRHP: July 3, 2003

The James and Mary Forsyth House is located on Albany Avenue near uptown Kingston, New York, United States. It is a brick Italian villa-style house designed by Richard Upjohn in the mid-19th century. When it was finished it was celebrated locally for its lavish decor. James Forsyth, as well as another later resident, left the house after being accused of financial wrongdoing. It has been modified slightly since its original construction with trim in the Colonial Revival style.

Along with the Old Dutch Church by Minard Lafever, it is the only extant pre-Civil War building, and the only house from that period, in Kingston designed by a nationally prominent architect. In the 20th century it was used as a Masonic Lodge. Since 1986 it has been the offices of a local construction company that has restored some of Kingston's other historic buildings. In 2003 it was listed on the National Register of Historic Places.

== Building ==
The house is at the front of a 3.3-acre (1.3 ha) lot on the north side of Albany Avenue across from Academy Green Park, the triangle formed by Albany, Clinton Avenue and Maiden Lane. On the west is a four-story brick Colonial Revival apartment building, built in the mid-1920s as the Governor Clinton Hotel. To the east are other commercial properties, culminating in the eastern terminus of Interstate 587 and NY 28 at the junction of Albany and Broadway. Behind the house, north of the property, is a parking lot and a small pond.

The building itself is a two-and-a-half-story, three-bay structure of load-bearing brick walls on a raised foundation of tooled limestone in an ashlar pattern. All the exterior trim is in wood. The roof, hipped with a gable crossing the center, is shingled in asphalt, with a molded cornice with large brackets supporting the eaves.

=== Exterior ===
On the south (front) facade, the first story has a wooden porch covering all three openings. The porch echoes the house, with a modillioned center gable and hipped roof supported by fluted Ionic columns with turned balusters between them. Behind them the windows have been fitted with French doors.

Windows on the second story have segmental brick arches, wooden hoods and cut stone sills. Above them is a single roundel window in the center gable.

The east profile has similar window treatments to the front on a one-bay projecting gabled section with a similar porch. The two flanking bays have porches for their French doors that cantilever out with perforated woodwork railings and large wood brackets with drop pendants supporting the hoods. By contrast, the central projecting bay's porch is similar to the front one. The center-bay second-story window has a round arch and is slightly recessed, giving it a Palladian feel. On the opposite side, the west elevation is similar with a bump-out at the southwest corner.

On the north side are similar windows and another projection, with a small frame addition. A fire escape runs up the side. There are no French doors on this elevation.

=== Interior ===
The main entrance consists of a modern door in front of the original paired glazed doors and a round glass transom. It opens into a small vestibule, which in turn leads through another pair of doors with stained glass lights and transom, possibly depicting scenes from Forsyth family history in a Romantic medieval fashion, into the L-shaped main hall with linoleum flooring. The basement stairs are directly ahead; the main stair is off to the right. A library and parlor are on the east and west respectively. Further to the north are a dining room and drawing room. A small bedroom and dressing room are in the addition on the rear.

Both the front parlor and library retain their original parquet flooring, molded baseboards and plaster cornice. The library also has a paneled wooden door with its original silver hardware, paneled pocket shutters on the French doors to the exterior. A set of wooden cabinets have a cornice with running guilloché frieze. In the parlor is a chimney breast with marble Italianate mantelpiece. A wide opening with Corinthian columns leads into the dining room to the north.

The dining room has similar flooring and walls, as well as another mantelpiece in the same material and style. A bracketed wooden frieze runs around the room at a height of six feet (2 m). The drawing room, the largest space on the first story, has 15-foot (4.6 m) ceilings and many of the same decorative features.

Near the stair to the second floor is a wooden settee. The staircase itself is cantilevered out, and consists of open stringers with carpet on the steps. It is decorated with a turned newel post and balusters. The round arched window on the east profile lights the landing with 19th-century stained glass.

The western half of the second floor is an open meeting room supported by steel I-beams visible from the attic, with carpeted floor and daises on the wall. The original master bedroom is in the northeast corner. It retains its marble mantelpiece in the chimney breast. It is currently carpeted, with acoustic tiles in the ceiling. The walls, baseboards and plaster cornice are original, as are the doors and silver hardware.

The attic has been extensively modified, although it is still possible to see how it was used originally as servants' quarters. The northeast room still has the original door and beaded board enclosures. The basement is still in its original layout, used for storage and service functions. There is an original cast iron stove in the kitchen. The servants' dining room retains its original doors and a Greek Revival wooden mantelpiece.

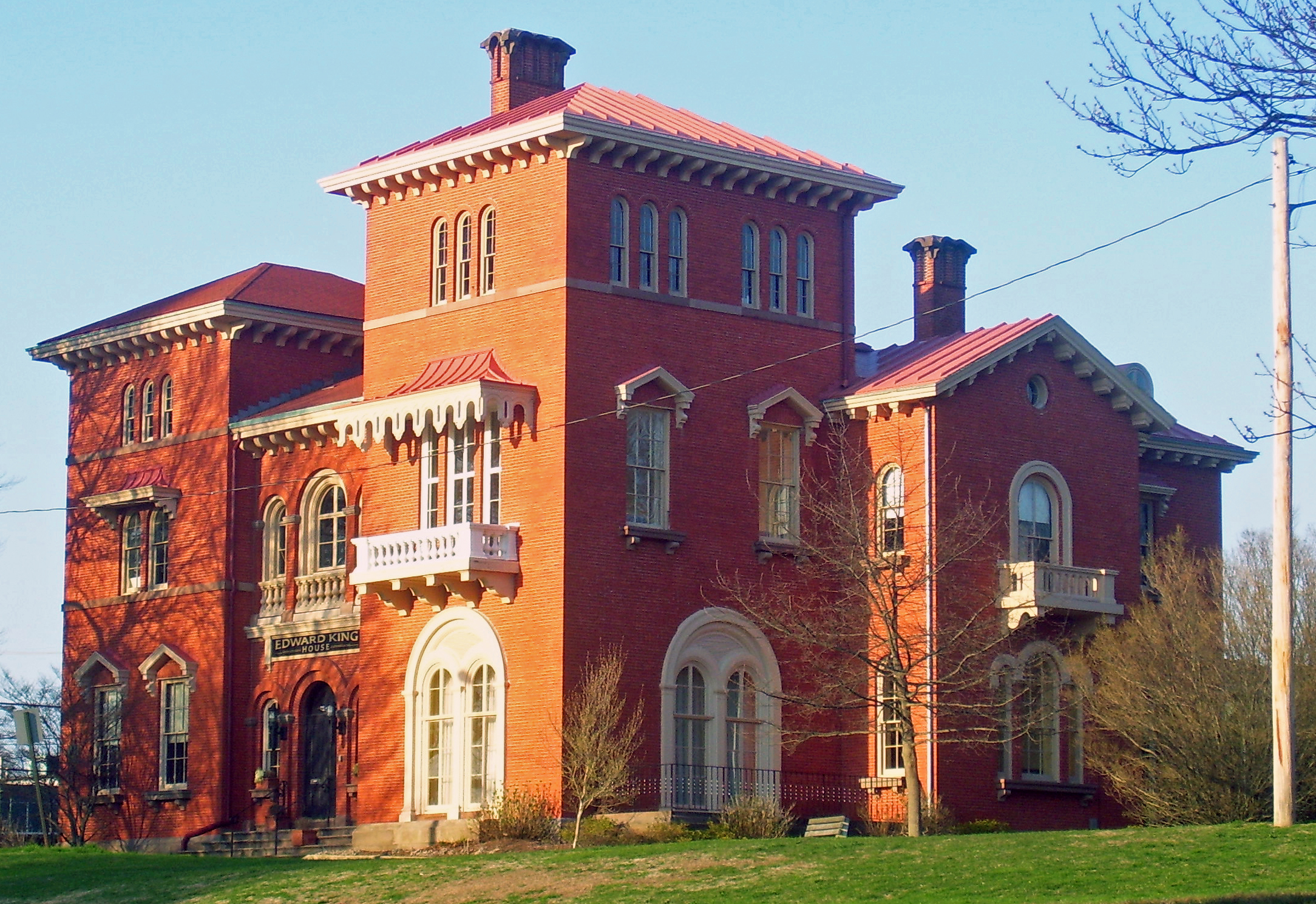
Edward King House

== Aesthetics ==
A few years before the Forsyth commission, Upjohn had built his first Italian villa, the Edward King House in Newport, Rhode Island. One of the earliest uses of that form in the country, it was praised by Andrew Jackson Downing in his book The Architecture of Country Houses, as "unit[ing] beauty of form and expression with spacious accommodation, in a manner not often seen ... There is dignity, refinement and elegance, all about its leading features".

For the Forsyth house, Upjohn used the center-gable variant of the Italian villa, instead of the tower variant he had used in Newport. His great-grandson, Everard Upjohn, writing about the house in the 1930s, saw similarities between the Forsyth and King houses. "[It] shows the same tendency to break up the mass", he observed. At the same time, he felt that the interior was so tightly divided that there was little possibility of opening it up.

The Forsyth House is also similar to Upjohn's J.J. Johnson House in Brooklyn's Flatbush neighborhood, since demolished. It, too, was an Italian villa with a center gable and roundel, segmented-arch windows with hoods and a bracketed cornice. "While not exciting, and certainly not such as to cause one to stare", wrote Everard Upjohn, "it escaped the most obtrusive faults of its time."

== History ==
A native of Newburgh, James Forsyth moved to Kingston in 1840 at the age of 21. He became a successful lawyer and politician, and married a local woman, Mary Bruyn. In 1847, he visited New Haven, Connecticut, then a center of contemporary architecture. He wrote his wife about the "exquisite private residences ... in every respect superior to any in Kingston".

The couple decided to build such a house in their hometown. After talking to an architect in New Haven, they turned to Upjohn, then enjoying renown for the success of Trinity Church. They consulted closely with the architect on the design throughout the process, and many of his renderings have survived. They are archived in Columbia University's Avery Library, and show that the house was not substantially modified from the original design. Asphalt shingles replaced the planned metal cladding on the roof, the only significant change to the exterior before the house was built. No records have been found from the actual construction.

When the house was finished in 1851, the Forsyths threw a housewarming party, with champagne and oysters, to which they invited many of Kingston's other affluent couples. Nathaniel Booth, a local merchant, echoed the Forsyths' original hope, writing that the house was "a splendid affair throwing all others in Kingston in the shade." The lavish decoration, he wondered, "would rather astonish the honest Dutch who built Old 'Sopus could they revisit old scenes", referring to Kingston's original 17th-century settlers.

Forsyth did not get to enjoy his sumptuous surroundings for long. He had made $200,000 ($7.74 million in contemporary dollars) through a number of fraudulent schemes, including forgery and illegal stock sales, and just before this was discovered in 1853 he left the country. After traveling through southern Europe for a while he made his way to the English city of Hereford on the Welsh border. There, under the assumed name of Edward Rashleigh, he drank heavily and died at the age of 36 in the Green Dragon Inn in 1855.

After his flight and death, his wife and children remained in the house. Sometime almost two decades later, in the 1870s, they sold it to William Fitch, a relative of Ezra Fitch. Later it was the property of county treasurer John Broadhead. During his tenure, around the turn of the century, the front porch was redone in a Colonial Revival mode and the columns at the dining room entryway were added. In the early 20th century, Broadhead moved to Connecticut after he was accused of stealing $80–200,000 from the county. At a public auction in 1907 it was sold to Samuel Gray, a grain dealer from Saugerties.

In 1939 the local Freemasons bought it. Local architect George Low supervised some large-scale changes, including the bump-out at the southwest corner and the opening of the western half of the second story to create a meeting room. A fire escape was also built on the rear of the building to comply with the building code.

After remaining vacant for years in the late 20th century when the Masons moved out, it was bought in late 2002 by Carey Construction, a local firm that has restored some city landmarks like the Persen House and City Hall. As part of its restoration, Carey said it might remove the other second floor walls to create a more open space for offices and add skylights to the roof but did not plan to make any other permanent changes.

== See also ==
- National Register of Historic Places listings in Ulster County, New York
