= Church of the Holy Cross (Middletown, Rhode Island) =

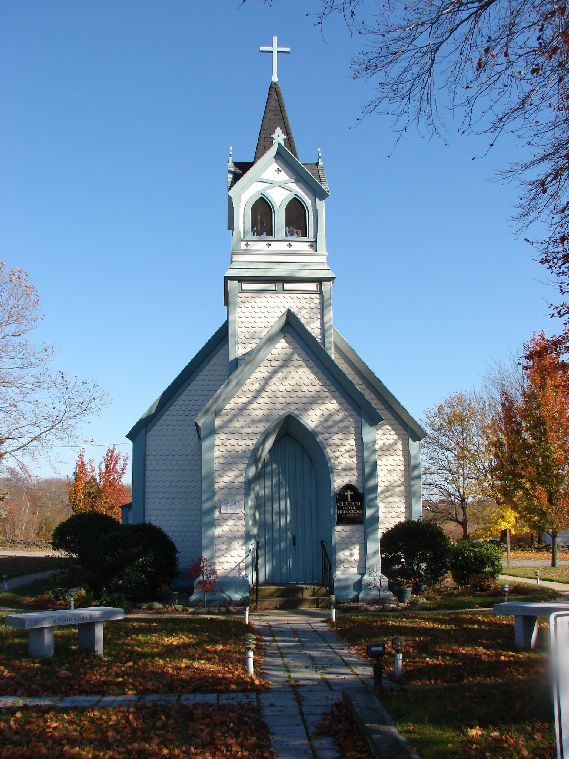
- Church of the Holy Cross, Middletown, RI
- Church of the Holy Cross
- Location: Middletown, Rhode Island, US
- Denomination: Episcopalian
- Website: http://www.churchoftheholycross.org/

History
- Founded: 1843
- Dedicated: 1845

Architecture
- Architect: Richard Upjohn
- Years built: 1844

Administration
- District: Aquidneck Deanery
- Diocese: Episcopal Diocese of Rhode Island

The Church of the Holy Cross in Middletown, Rhode Island, is a parish church of the Episcopal Diocese of Rhode Island of The Episcopal Church. The church is located at 1439 West Main Road, Middletown, Rhode Island. The church reported 60 members in 2019 and 45 members in 2023; no membership statistics were reported nationally in 2024 parochial reports. Plate and pledge income reported for the congregation in 2024 was $45,338. Average Sunday attendance (ASA) in 2024 was 24 persons.

The building is an early example of Richard Upjohn's work in translating Gothic architecture from stone to affordable designs for small, wooden churches. Built in 1845, Holy Cross Church exemplifies the architecture made accessible by the publication in 1852 of Upjohn's book, Rural Architecture. In its survey of Middletown's architectural resources, the Rhode Island Historical Preservation Commission recommended the Church of the Holy Cross for inclusion in the National Register, along with Upjohn's more luxurious Italianate Hamilton Hoppin House.

== Description ==
A 1-story, end-gable, Gothic Revival structure with patterned-shingle sides, a projecting pedimented entry, square belfry in front and stained-glass Gothic windows.

== History ==
Holy Cross Church was designed by Richard Upjohn, an Englishman, who also designed Trinity Church in New York and St. Stephen's and Grace Church in Providence, Rhode Island. Upjohn was commissioned to build three Episcopal churches on Aquidneck Island, the other two being St. Mary's in Portsmouth and the now demolished Old Emmanual Church in Newport. At its consecration on October 14, 1845, Bishop Henshaw said, "Rustic in its exterior, but so chaste in its interior finish, and so perfect in its proportion, that it is more imposing in its religious impression and far better adapted to its sacred use than many buildings of far greater cost and pretensions."

From the church history:

"The Church of the Holy Cross had its beginnings specifically with two people, Miss Sarah Gibbs and John Henry Gilliat and possibly indirectly with a third person, Miss Cynthia Taggart, also with the unnamed people who welcomed the opportunity to attend religious services near their homes. In the early 1840s, Miss Gibbs became interested in bringing religious services and instruction to her neighbors. In November 1843, at the invitation of Rev. Francis Vinton, rector of Trinity Church, the Rev. Hobart Williams arrived in South Portsmouth to organize a mission. Miss Gibbs invited Rev. Williams to make his home at Oakland. Services were held at Oakland, a nearby school house, at homes of neighbors and in a school house on Middle Road in Portsmouth. In the spring of 1844 the attendance at the morning services became too large for the small school house and was transferred to Oliphant School on West Main Road in Middletown. On the first Sunday after Easter, April 14, 1844, Morning prayer was publicly offered in that place for the first time. Services were continued until the fall of the same year. The growing religious interest in the neighborhood now seemed to justify the building of a free chapel to provide a place where services could be held in the middle of the island. In April 1845, Mr. John H. Gilliat purchased from Thomas George Rogers, a brother-in-law of Cynthia Taggart, 1/2 acre of land on the South corner of Oliphant Lane and West Road for $75. Mr. Richard Upjohn, an Englishman, was employed as the architect. Mr. Upjohn had designed Trinity Church in New York and St. Stephen's Church and Grace Church in Providence. The Church was built with the gift from Mr. Gilliat of $2,145. Others gave $283.50 for the site and some special interior furnishings."

== See also ==
Carpenter Gothic
