= Edward King House =

Historic house in Rhode Island, United States

- U.S. National Register of Historic Places
- U.S. National Historic Landmark
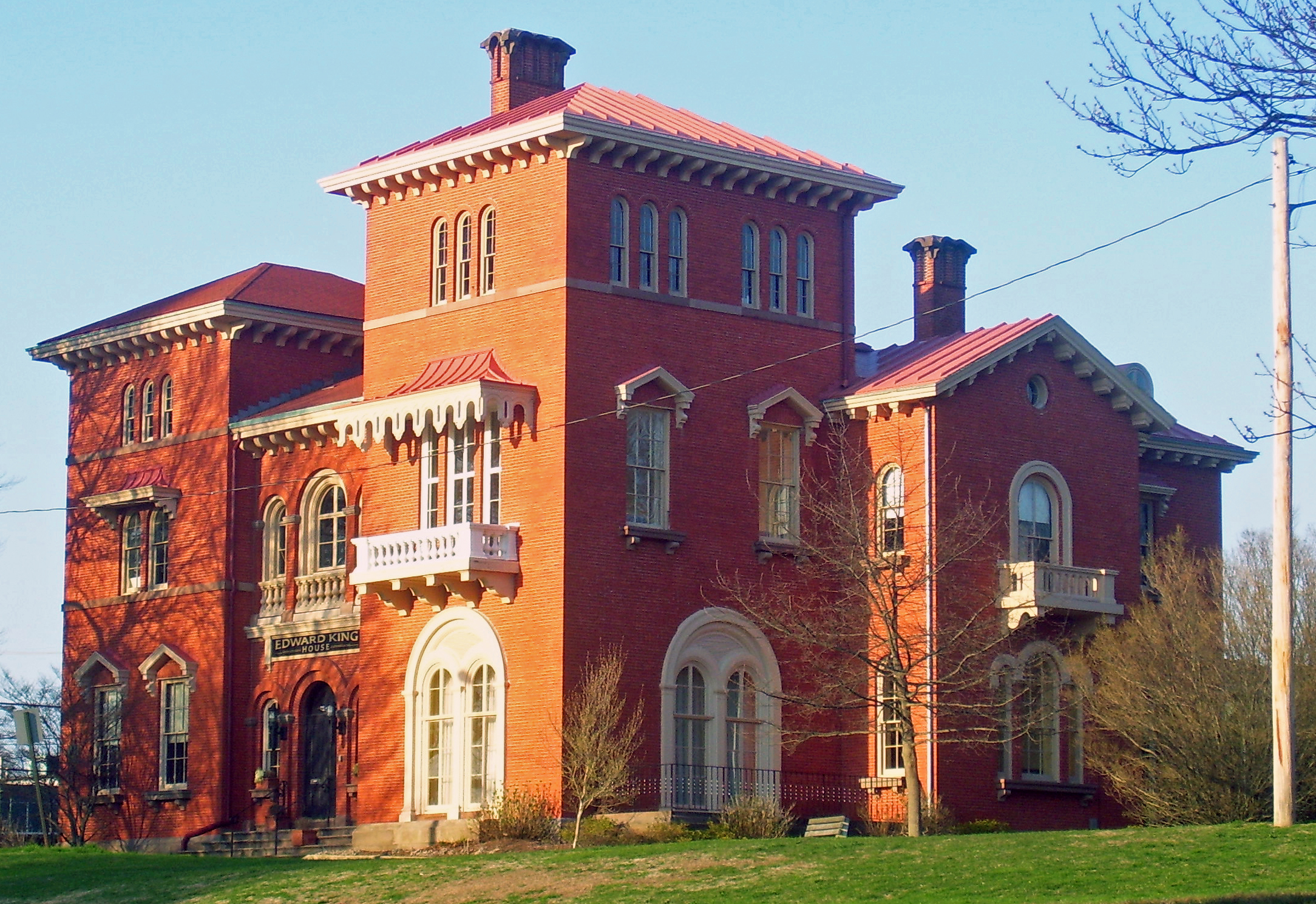
- Front elevation and south profile, 2008
- Location: 35 King Street; Newport, Rhode Island
- Coordinates: 41°28′55.49″N 71°18′39.13″W
- Area: 4 acres (1.6 ha)
- Built: 1845-47
- Architect: Richard Upjohn
- Architectural style: "Italian Villa"/Italianate
- NRHP reference No.: 70000024

Significant dates
- Added to NRHP: October 15, 1970
- Designated NHL: December 30, 1970

The Edward King House, is a monumentally scaled residence at 35 King street in Newport, Rhode Island, United States. It was designed for Edward King in the "Italian Villa" style by Richard Upjohn and was built between 1845 and 1847, making it one of the earliest representations of the style. It was the largest and grandest house in Newport when it was built. Edward King was the largest landowner in town by 1860, having made his fortune through the China Trade.

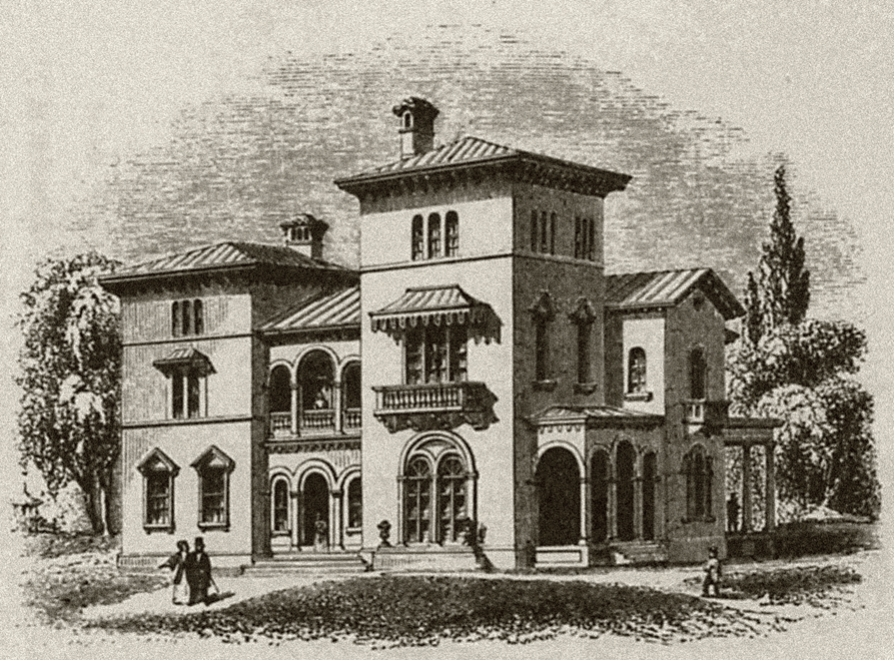
Engraving of Upjohn's design from Andrew J. Downing's The Architecture of County Houses.

The house is built in brick, has asymmetrical massing, arched window heads, and a prominent three story tower. It was Upjohn's first use of the "Italian Villa" style. These elements would later come to be considered typical features of Italianate design. The house was featured in Andrew Jackson Downing's The Architecture of Country Houses in 1850, including an engraving of the house and architectural plans. Downing described the house as "one of the most successful specimens of the Italian style in the United States." He went on to note the great variety of window sizes and types and noted the harmony of the design.

The Edward King House was donated to the city of Newport in 1912 by Edward King's son and subsequently housed the Newport Public Library. It is now a senior citizens' center, The Newport Senior Center at the Edward King House. It was placed on the National Register of Historic Places on 15 October 1970 and designated as a National Historic Landmark on 30 December 1970. It has a notable Southern counterpart in Kenworthy Hall, designed by Upjohn a decade later. That house is also a National Historic Landmark.

== See also ==
- List of National Historic Landmarks in Rhode Island
- National Register of Historic Places listings in Newport County, Rhode Island
