= Acton Incident =

Acton Incident Acton Massacre
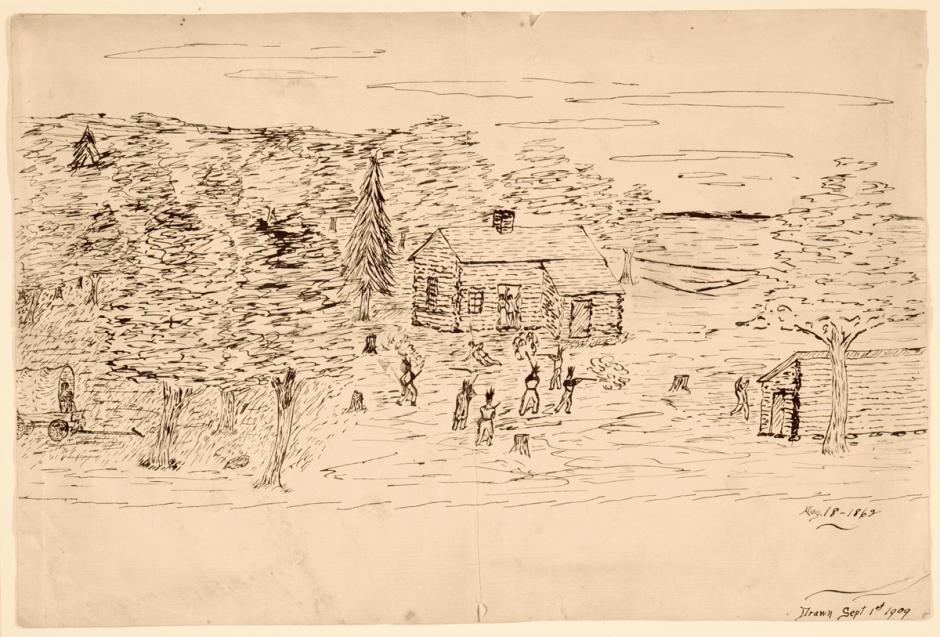
- 1909 illustration of the massacre by Dan Nelson
- Location: Acton, Minnesota, U.S.
- Date: August 17, 1862
- Target: European and Anglo-American farmers
- Attack type: Civilian shooting
- Deaths: 5
- Victim: 5
- Perpetrators: 4 Dakota men: Sungigidan (“Brown Wing”); Kaomdeiyeyedan (“Breaking Up”); Nagiwicakte (“Killing Ghost”); Pazoiyopa (“Runs Against Something When Crawling”)
- Motive: Disagreements with the Treaty of Traverse des Sioux, starvation, and the forced displacement of the Dakota people

The Acton Incident, also called the Acton Massacre, was a mass killing of five civilians in Acton Township in Meeker County. It was perpetrated by several Dakota men and was one of several contributing factors which led to the Dakota War of 1862.

== History ==
=== Background ===
The events which led up to the incident predate it by several decades. Several land cession treaties signed by the Dakota, including the Treaty of Mendota, the Treaty of Traverse des Sioux, and the Treaty with the Sioux, 1858, all effectively ended Dakota land rights in Minnesota and established both the Upper Sioux Agency and Lower Sioux Agency along the Minnesota River where the Dakota would be mandated to live.

The treaties brought with them corrupt traders and Indian agents such as Thomas J. Galbraith and Andrew Myrick who cared little for the welfare of those on the agencies, so long as they were paid for their expenditures. In desperation, it was not uncommon for the Dakota to hunt off of agency land in order to supplement the meager rations given to them by the Minnesota state government. A winter blizzard followed by a crop failure during the summer of 1862 led to mass starvation on both agencies; in desperation, many Dakota sought out any food they could acquire.

=== Massacre ===
On August 17, 1862, four Dakota men from the Lower Sioux Agency came upon the settlement at Acton following a deer hunt. Hungry and desperate for food, some of the Dakota stole eggs from a local farmer and postmaster, Robinson Jones. Jones and his family lived in a log cabin in western Meeker County, Minnesota which doubled as a trading post and post office to the nearby settlement of Grove City, Minnesota. Alvin M. Josephy Jr. states in his book War on the Frontier: The Trans-Mississippi West that when confronted on stealing the eggs one of the Dakota "objected that the theft would get them all in trouble". Josephy goes on to say that the one Dakota man who objected to stealing was ridiculed by his colleagues and called a coward. In return the Dakota who refused "boasted that he was not afraid to steal eggs or even, if the opportunity arose, to kill a white man". Another writer who backs up this statement would be Minnesota Historical Society historian Kenneth Carley, who states in his book The Dakota War of 1862: Minnesota's Other Civil War that the Dakota who had originally refused later stated "I am not afraid of the white man, and to show you that I am not I will go to the house and shoot him. Are you brave enough to go with me?". Other writers such as American educator Michael Andregg simply argue that "a dispute erupted and one [Dakota] killed the farmer [Jones]". The incident which took place following the stealing of Jones' eggs differs slightly dependent on the source.

According to one source, the book Recollections of the Sioux Massacre by Oscar Garrett Wall, when the Dakota spoke to Jones he eventually renewed an old quarrel he had with one of the Dakota men over a hunting rifle. It is surmised by Wall that Jones recognized one of the Dakota men as the same man he had loaned a rifle to which was never returned to him, which the Dakota denied. The Dakota left Jones' home for the nearby Baker farm owned by Howard Baker which was nearby where they drank water and smoked tobacco. According to Wall, Jones later encountered the Dakota men at Baker's home and renewed his argument over the hunting rifle. Wall argues that during the altercation Baker's wife inquired if Jones had given them liquor, Jones replied that he "had no liquor for such black devils as these" which the Dakota found insulting. Following Jones's harsh words the Dakota, now enraged, challenged Jones to a shooting competition. During the ensuing competition the Dakota fired their rifles at Jones, his wife, Mr. Baker, and Viranus Webster, a spectator. Josephy states in War on the Frontier that the Dakota shot Jones and others for "no evident reason". Gary Clayton Anderson however, argues in his book Massacre in Minnesota: The Dakota War of 1862, the Most Violent Ethnic Conflict in American History that the Dakota premediated the shooting using the ruse of trading their rifles in order to kill Jones. According to Anderson while shooting during the competition the Dakota "wheeled and killed Jones and four other settlers".

The end result was that the four Dakota men ended up killing five total civilians from Acton: farmer and postmaster Robinson Jones, Ann Baker, Howard Baker, Viranus Webster, and a young girl, Clara D. Wilson.

=== Aftermath ===
Following the Acton Incident, the four Dakota men fled to their village at Rice Creek to tell their leaders what they had done. One of these leaders was Little Crow, who greatly disapproved of their actions. The bodies of the five victims were buried in a single mass grave at the Ness Norwegian Lutheran church cemetery in present-day Litchfield, Minnesota. A state monument dedicated to the victims of the incident placed on the grounds of the Ness Lutheran Church in Litchfield on September 13, 1878.

== Legacy ==
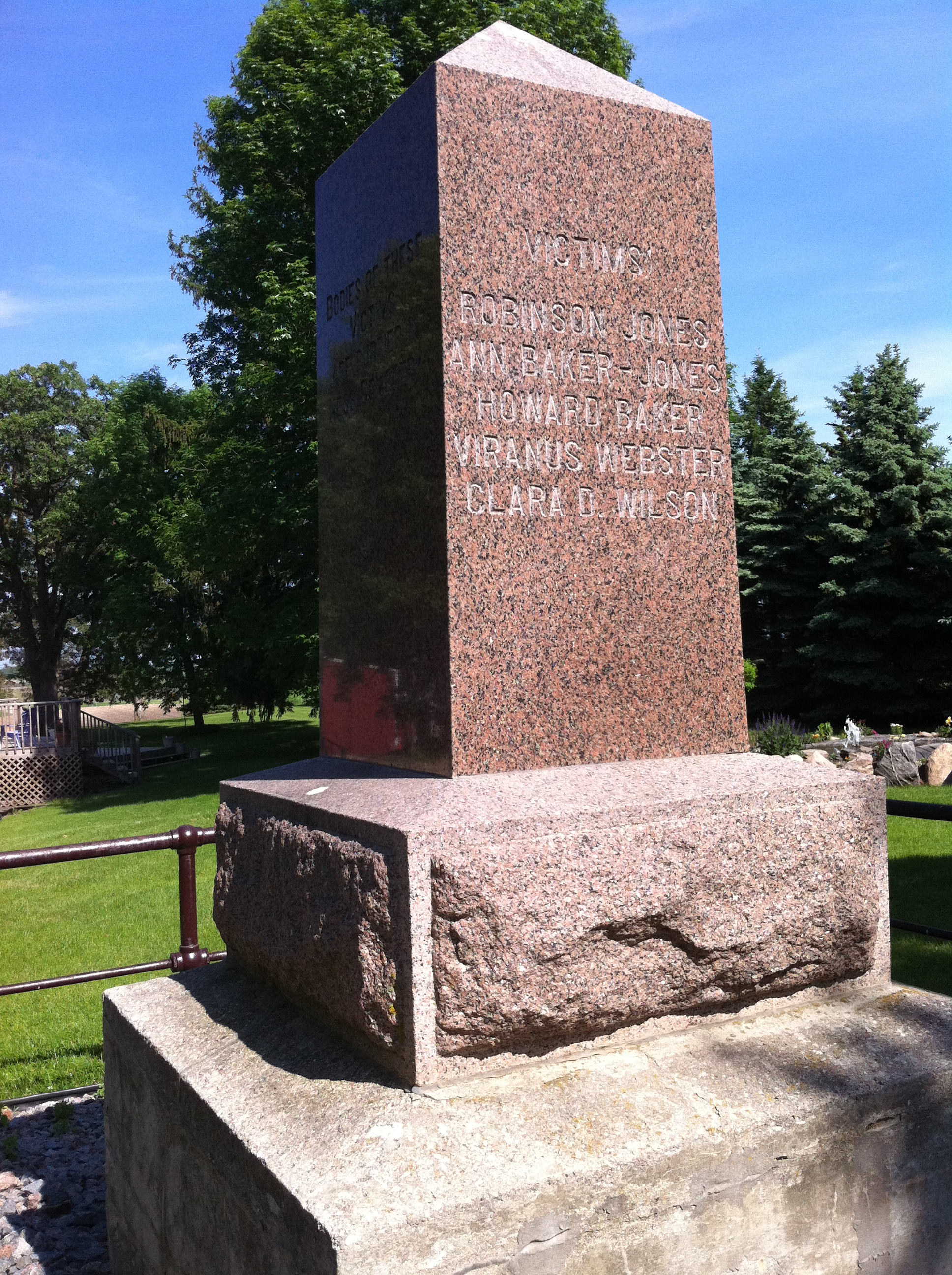
The 1909 Acton Incident Memorial

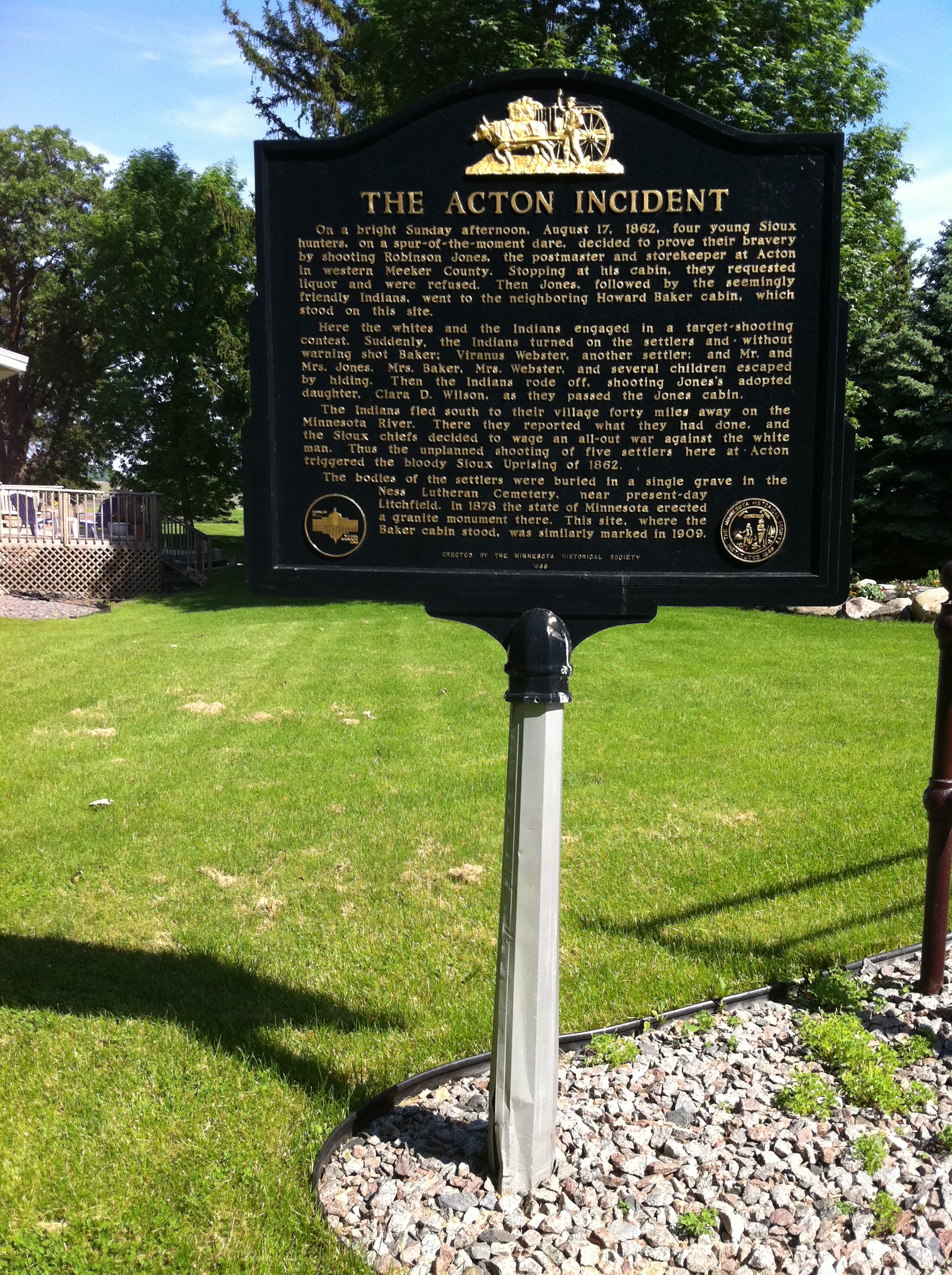
The 2012 Acton Incident Marker from the Minnesota Historical Society

Two historical markers exist near Grove City, Minnesota. The first marker was erected on August 17, 1909 on the 47th anniversary of the incident by the state of Minnesota. It is located in the Ness Cemetery in Acton Township and lists the five victims of the attacks along with the dedication date.

The second historical marker was erected in 2012 by the Minnesota Historical Society, commemorating the incident.

== In popular culture ==
A dramatized and graphic scene in the 1972 Swedish film The New Land depicts the Acton Incident and the opening of the Dakota Uprising.
