= Grove City, Minnesota =

City in Minnesota, United States

- City
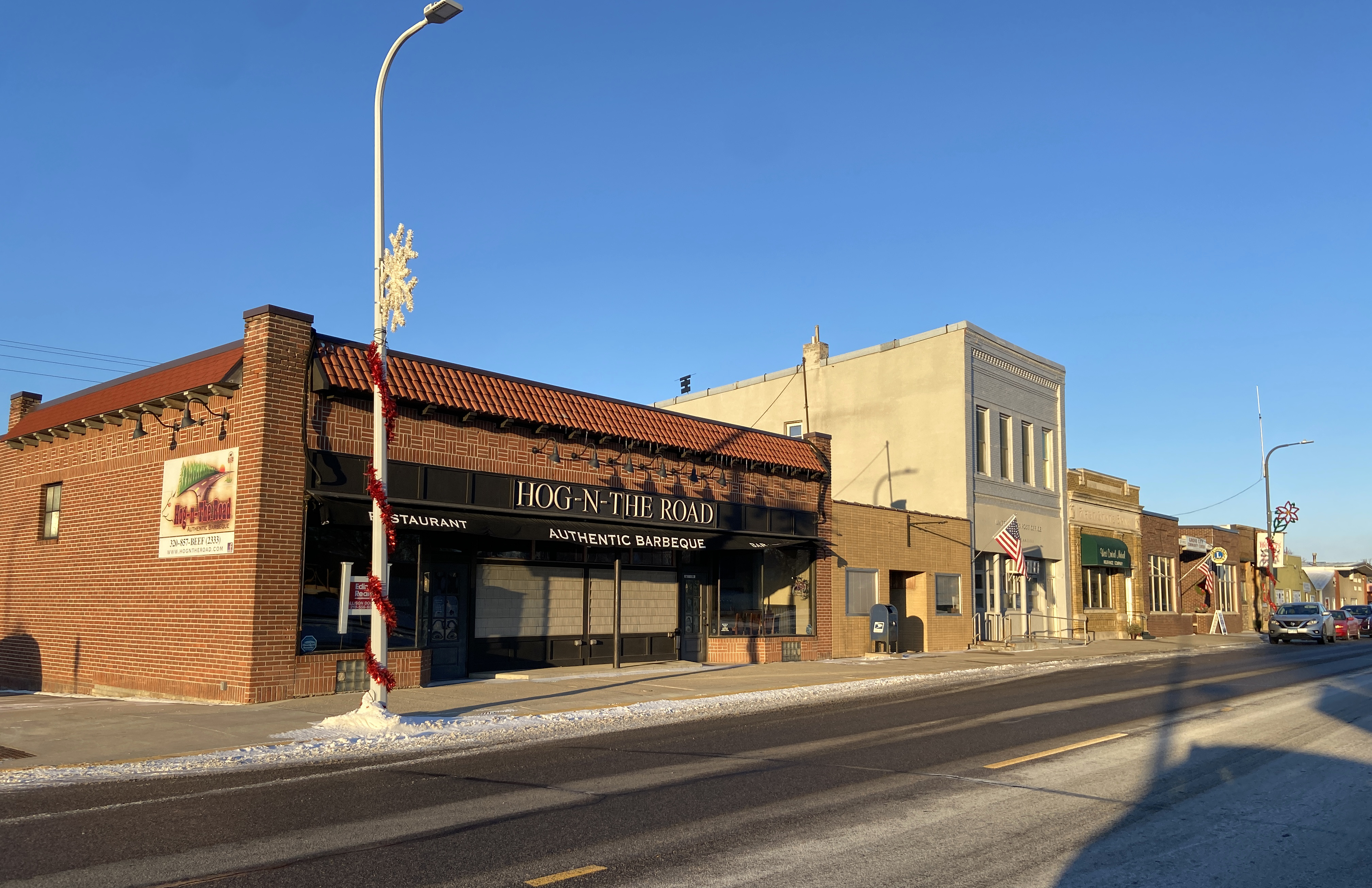
- Atlantic Avenue businesses

- Location in Meeker County and the state of Minnesota
- Coordinates: 45°08′57″N 94°40′56″W
- Country: United States
- State: Minnesota
- County: Meeker

Area
  - Total: 0.66 sq mi (1.71 km^{2})
  - Land: 0.61 sq mi (1.58 km^{2})
  - Water: 0.050 sq mi (0.13 km^{2})
- Elevation: 1,211 ft (369 m)

Population (2020)
  - Total: 624
  - Density: 1,022.9/sq mi (394.95/km^{2})
- Time zone: UTC-6 (CST)
  - Summer (DST): UTC-5 (CDT)
- ZIP code: 56243
- Area code: 320
- FIPS code: 27-26126
- GNIS feature ID: 0644499
- Website: grovecitymn.gov

Grove City is a city in Meeker County, Minnesota, United States. The population was 624 at the 2020 census.

== History ==
In 1870, the St. Paul and Pacific Railway came to Acton Township and built the Acton Station 2 miles (3 km) east of today's Grove City. There was also a post office one mile north called "Swede Grove". The different locations caused confusion, and the people convinced the railroad to move the station to present-day Grove City.

Grove City was incorporated in 1878. In naming the town, "Grove" was chosen from Swede Grove, and "City" represented the citizens' hope for the town's future. A post office called Grove City has been in operation since 1879, having moved from north of the town. The post office was among the first businesses. Other early businesses included four grocery stories, two hardware stores, four filling stations, two hotels, two lumberyards, two banks, two blacksmiths, a barrel factory, a feed mill, and four grain elevators. There were five saloons, a pool hall, restaurants, a confectioner, a shoe store, a millinery shop, and a bakery.

== Geography ==
Grove City is in western Meeker County. U.S. Highway 12 and Minnesota State Highway 4 are two of the main routes in the community, passing through the north side of the city as Atlantic Avenue. US 12 leads east 9 miles (14 km) to Litchfield, the Meeker county seat, and west 18 miles (29 km) to Willmar, while MN 4 leads north 17 miles (27 km) to Paynesville and south 15 miles (24 km) to Cosmos.

According to the U.S. Census Bureau, Grove City has an area of 0.66 square miles (1.71 km^{2}), of which 0.61 square miles (1.58 km^{2}) are land and 0.05 square miles (0.13 km^{2}), or 0.45%, are water. The city is in the watershed of Grove Creek, which flows northeast to join the Middle Fork of the Crow River near Manannah.

== Education ==
Grove City is the site of (ACGC High School) which combines students from the cities of Atwater, Cosmos, and Grove City in Minnesota.

== Demographics ==
Historical population
Census	Pop.	Note	%±
1880	230		—
1890	349		51.7%
1900	316		−9.5%
1910	351		11.1%
1920	388		10.5%
1930	372		−4.1%
1940	447		20.2%
1950	481		7.6%
1960	466		−3.1%
1970	531		13.9%
1980	596		12.2%
1990	547		−8.2%
2000	608		11.2%
2010	635		4.4%
2020	624		−1.7%
U.S. Decennial Census; 2020 Census

=== 2010 census ===
As of the census of 2010, there were 635 people, 268 households, and 169 families living in the city. The population density was 920.3 inhabitants per square mile (355.3/km^{2}). There were 291 housing units at an average density of 421.7 per square mile (162.8/km^{2}). The racial makeup of the city was 97.0% White, 0.9% African American, 0.2% Native American, 0.3% Asian, 0.2% from other races, and 1.4% from two or more races. Hispanic or Latino of any race were 2.8% of the population.

There were 268 households, of which 31.7% had children under the age of 18 living with them, 44.0% were married couples living together, 11.6% had a female householder with no husband present, 7.5% had a male householder with no wife present, and 36.9% were non-families. 31.3% of all households were made up of individuals, and 11.5% had someone living alone who was 65 years of age or older. The average household size was 2.37 and the average family size was 2.92.

The median age in the city was 35.6 years. 26.8% of residents were under the age of 18; 7% were between the ages of 18 and 24; 26% were from 25 to 44; 24.2% were from 45 to 64; and 16.2% were 65 years of age or older. The gender makeup of the city was 47.6% male and 52.4% female.

=== 2000 census ===
As of the census of 2000, there were 608 people, 257 households, and 160 families living in the city. The population density was 951.8 inhabitants per square mile (367.5/km^{2}). There were 271 housing units at an average density of 424.2 per square mile (163.8/km^{2}). The racial makeup of the city was 97.86% White, 0.33% Asian, 0.33% from other races, and 1.48% from two or more races. Hispanic or Latino of any race were 2.96% of the population.

There were 257 households, out of which 30.4% had children under the age of 18 living with them, 46.7% were married couples living together, 12.8% had a female householder with no husband present, and 37.4% were non-families. 31.5% of all households were made up of individuals, and 14.4% had someone living alone who was 65 years of age or older. The average household size was 2.37 and the average family size was 2.98.

In the city, the population was spread out, with 28.5% under the age of 18, 10.0% from 18 to 24, 24.0% from 25 to 44, 20.4% from 45 to 64, and 17.1% who were 65 years of age or older. The median age was 36 years. For every 100 females, there were 88.8 males. For every 100 females age 18 and over, there were 86.7 males.

The median income for a household in the city was $29,313, and the median income for a family was $38,750. Males had a median income of $28,125 versus $20,417 for females. The per capita income for the city was $14,237. About 9.4% of families and 12.3% of the population were below the poverty line, including 10.3% of those under age 18 and 22.5% of those age 65 or over.

== Notable people ==
- Fred Marshall (1906–1985), U.S. representative from Minnesota

== Gallery ==
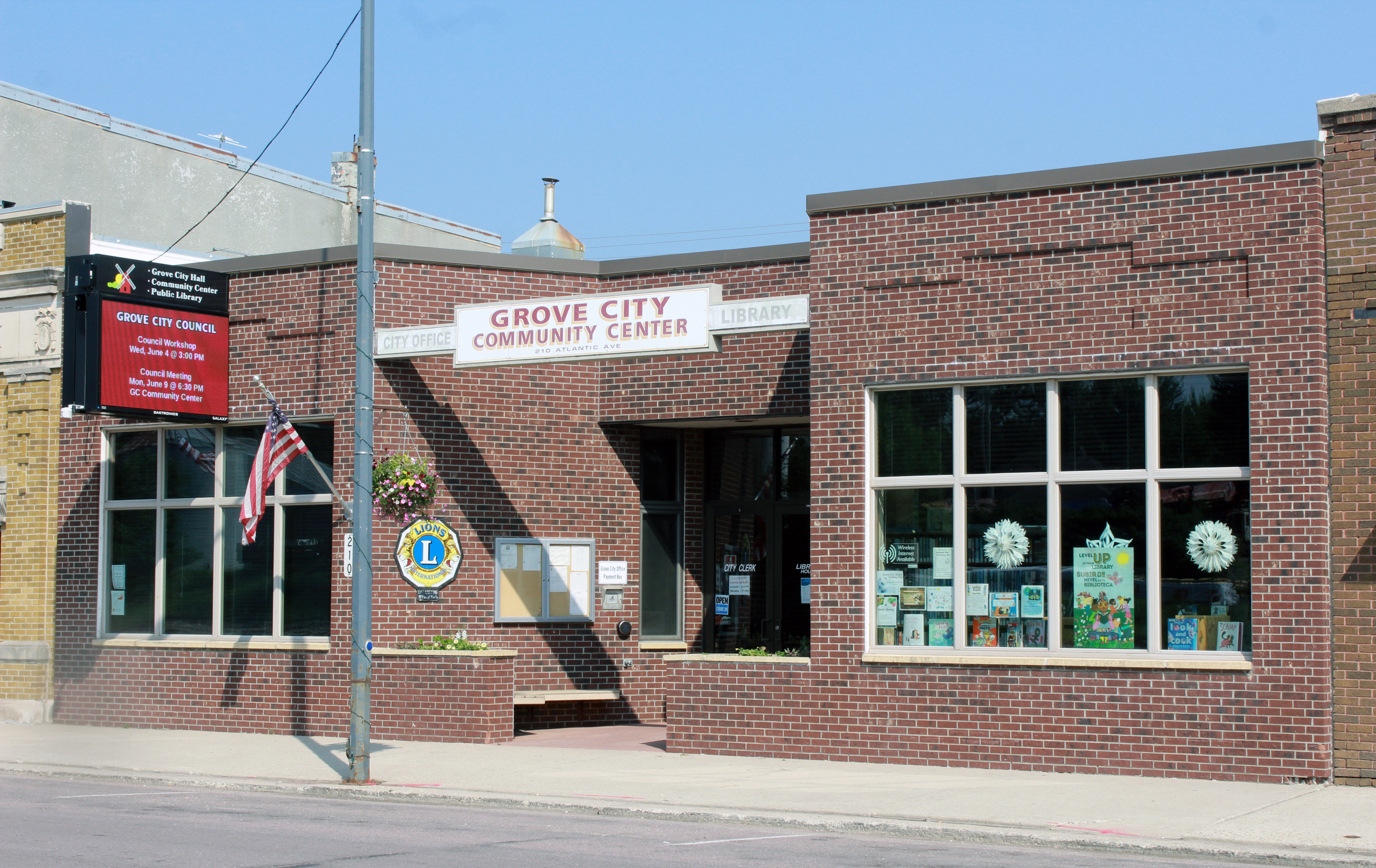
Community Center; City Offices; Library

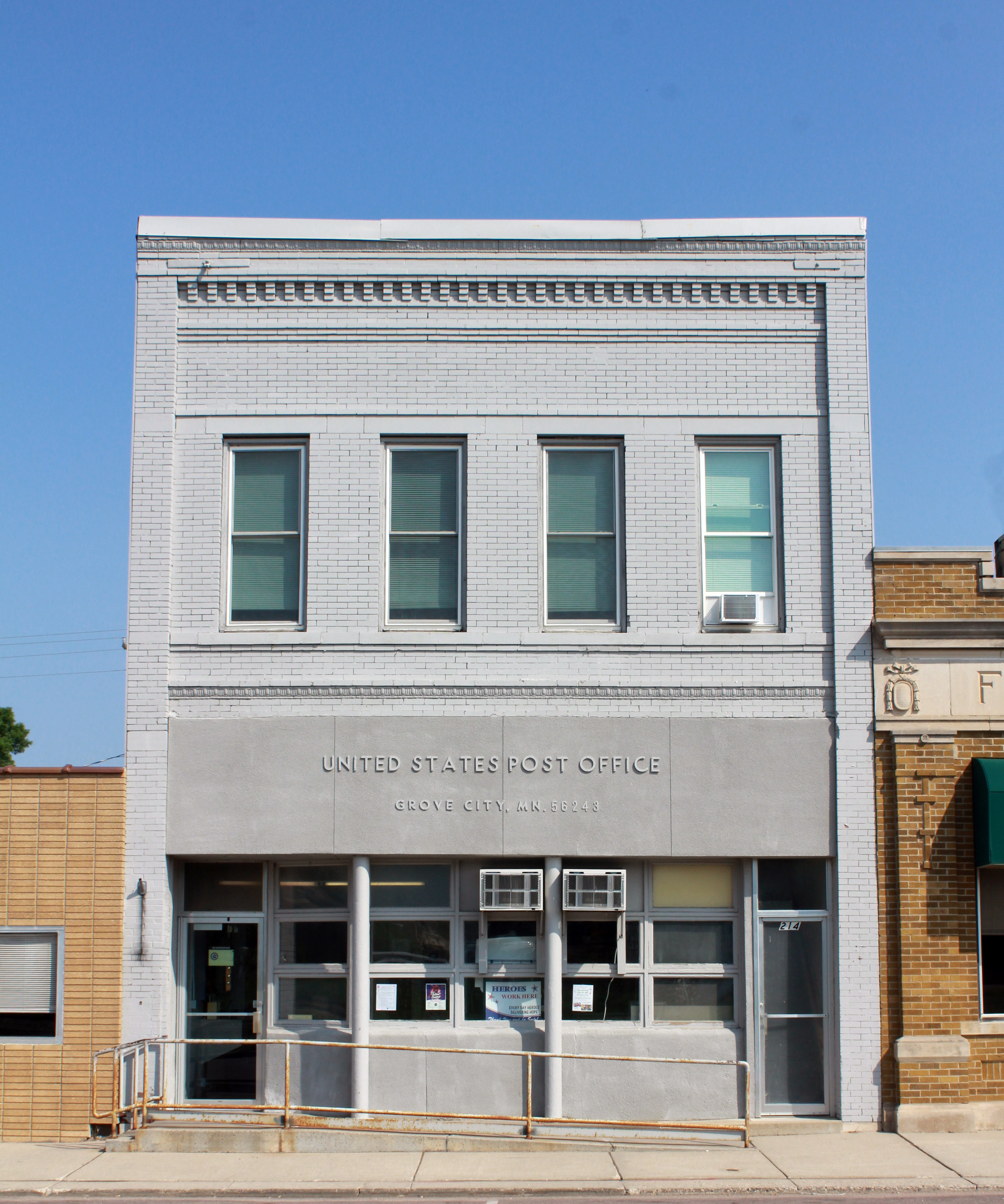
Post office

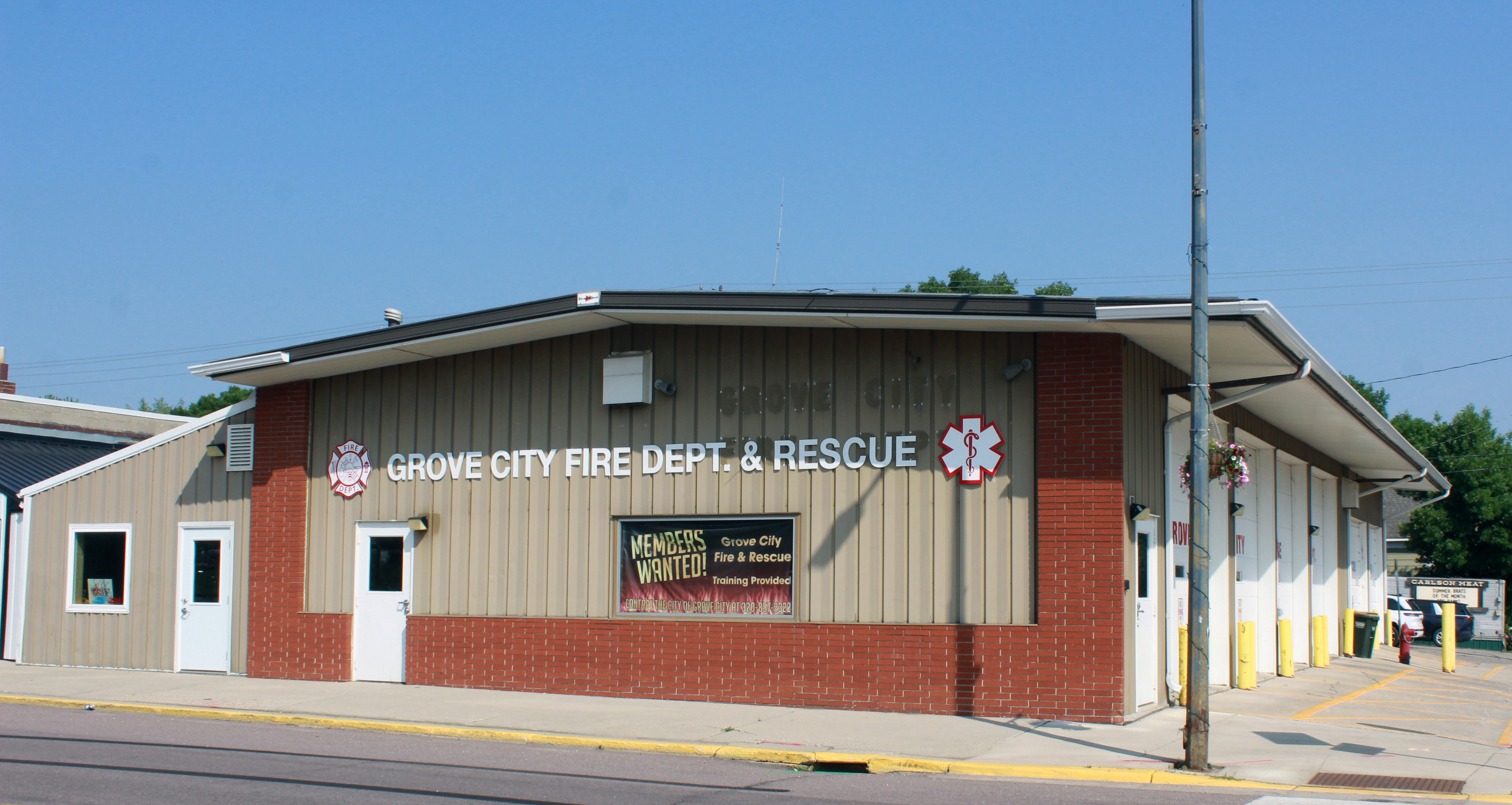
Fire Station

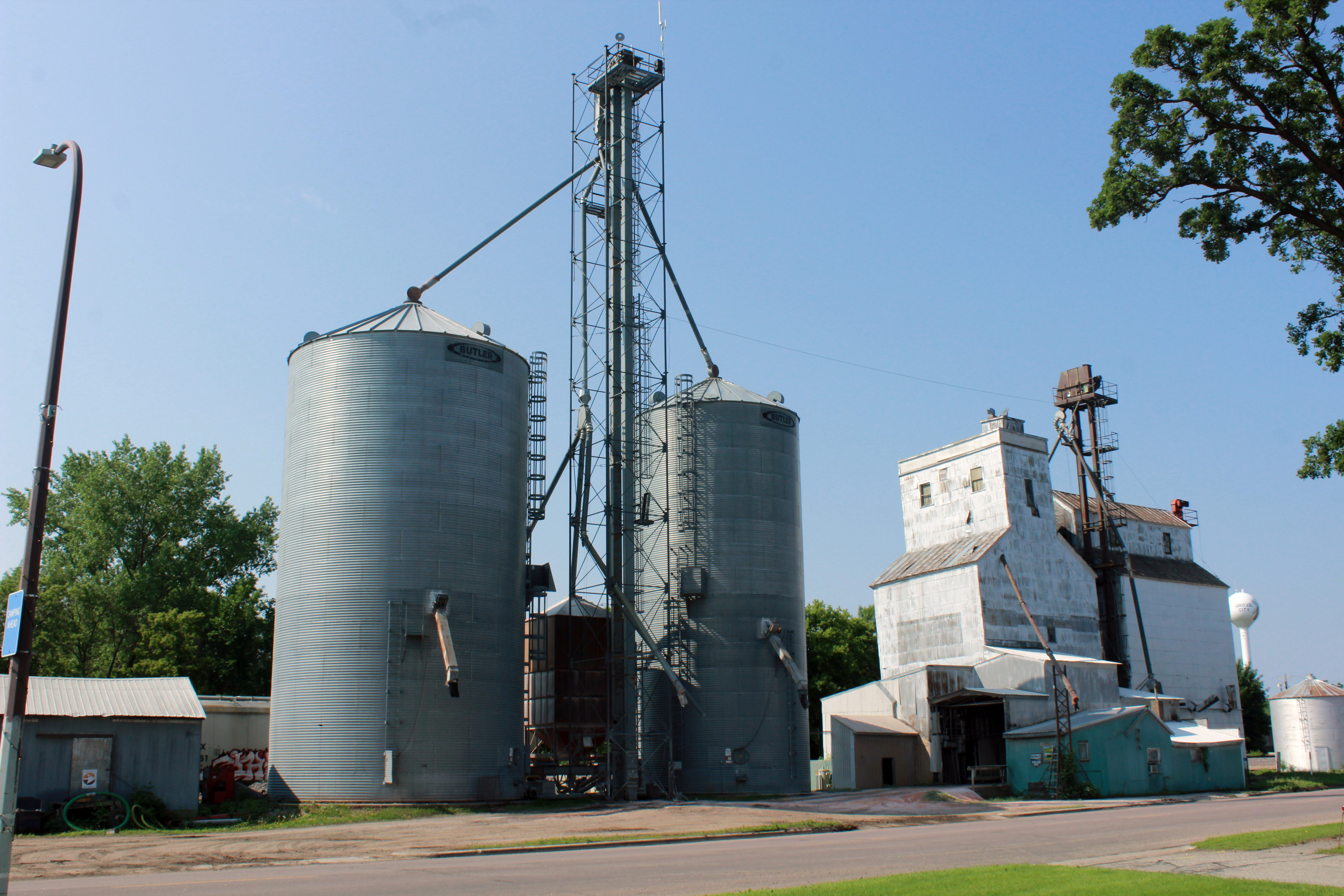
Grain Elevator

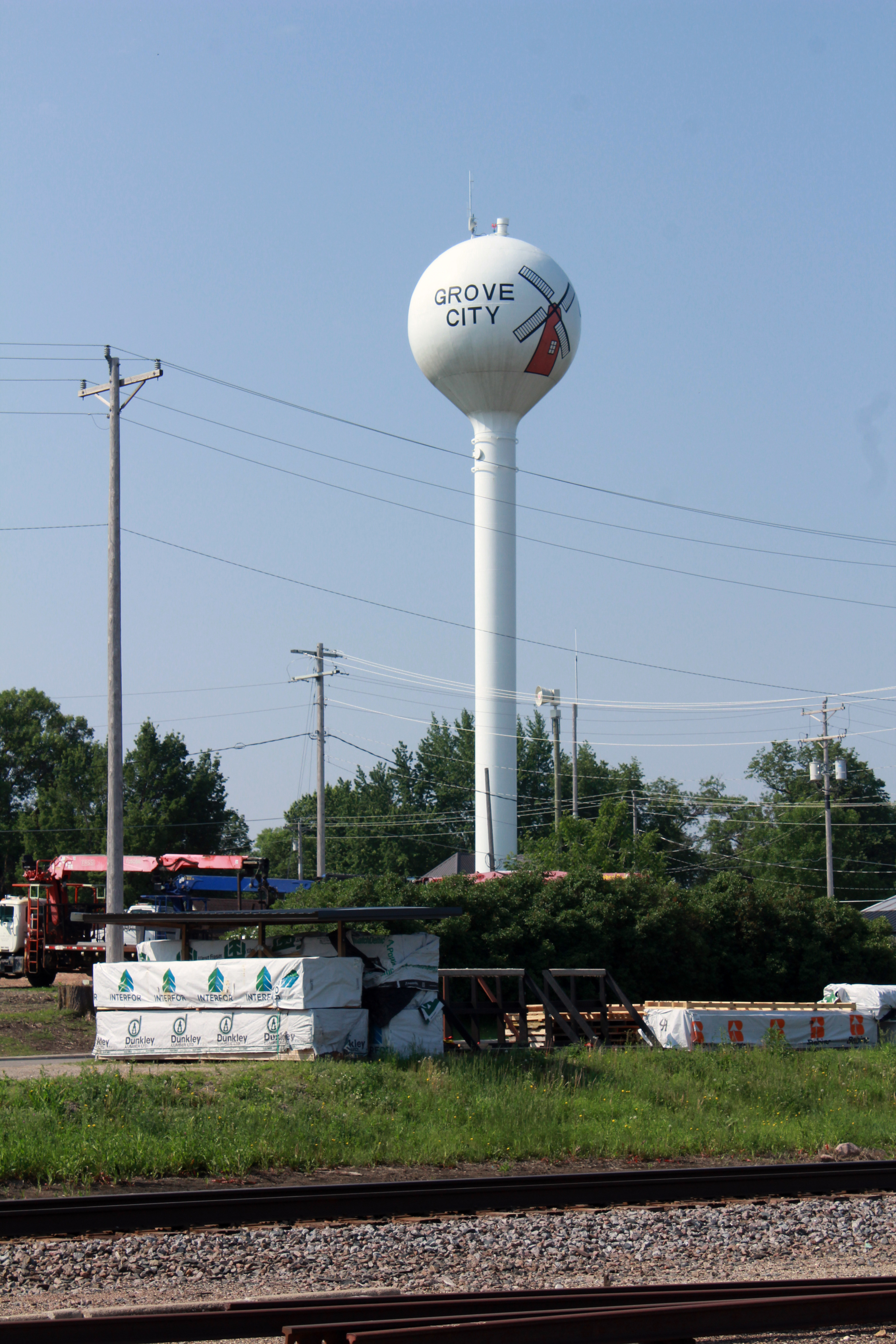
Water tower
