= Manannah Township, Meeker County, Minnesota =

Manannah Township, Minnesota
- Township
- Location within the state of Minnesota Manannah Township, Minnesota (the United States)
- Coordinates: 45°17′N 94°34′W
- Country: United States
- State: Minnesota
- County: Meeker

Area
  - Total: 38.6 sq mi (99.9 km^{2})
  - Land: 38.5 sq mi (99.6 km^{2})
  - Water: 0.12 sq mi (0.3 km^{2})
- Elevation: 1,171 ft (357 m)

Population (2000)
  - Total: 610
  - Density: 16/sq mi (6.1/km^{2})
- Time zone: UTC-6 (Central (CST))
  - Summer (DST): UTC-5 (CDT)
- FIPS code: 27-39698
- GNIS feature ID: 0664884

Manannah Township is a township in Meeker County, Minnesota, United States. The population was 610 at the 2000 census. Most of the city of Eden Valley is located in Manannah Township

Manannah Township was organized in 1857, and named after Manannah.

== History ==
The original white settlers came to Manannah Township in 1856, including Nathan C. Caswell, Ziba Caswell, Edward Brown, Silas Caswell and A. D. Pierce. They settled near the town of Eden Valley. Patrick McNulty was the first school teach in district No. 12 in 1866. The first religious service was held a Methodist minister, Rev. Kidder, in the old village of Manannah in 1859. The name for the village of Manannah came from an old Scottish history. The first post office was established in 1857 with Jonathan Kimball as postmaster. While nothing remains of the original Manannah village, a new Manannah village was laid out in 1871 in sections 30 and 31. The Catholic Church of Our Lady, at Manannah, was established in 1876. The village of Eden Valley, was laid out in 1886 on the Minneapolis & Pacific Railroad. A post office was established in Eden Valley on April 1, 1887.

== Geography ==
According to the United States Census Bureau, the township has a total area of 38.6 square miles (99.9 km^{2}), of which 38.5 square miles (99.6 km^{2}) is land and 0.1 square miles (0.3 km^{2}) (0.31%) is water.

Manannah Township is located in Township 121 North of the Arkansas Base Line and Range 31 West of the 5th Principal Meridian.

== Demographics ==
As of the census of 2000, there were 610 people, 207 households, and 168 families residing in the township. The population density was 15.9 inhabitants per square mile (6.1/km^{2}). There were 216 housing units at an average density of 5.6 per square mile (2.2/km^{2}). The racial makeup of the township was 99.84% White and 0.16% Asian. Hispanic or Latino of any race were 0.49% of the population.

There were 207 households, out of which 40.1% had children under the age of 18 living with them, 70.5% were married couples living together, 4.8% had a female householder with no husband present, and 18.4% were non-families. 16.4% of all households were made up of individuals, and 6.8% had someone living alone who was 65 years of age or older. The average household size was 2.95 and the average family size was 3.27.

In the township the population was spread out, with 32.6% under the age of 18, 6.2% from 18 to 24, 27.5% from 25 to 44, 21.1% from 45 to 64, and 12.5% who were 65 years of age or older. The median age was 35 years. For every 100 females, there were 114.8 males. For every 100 females age 18 and over, there were 117.5 males.

The median income for a household in the township was $39,813, and the median income for a family was $41,250. Males had a median income of $28,500 versus $20,774 for females. The per capita income for the township was $14,077. About 7.1% of families and 8.2% of the population were below the poverty line, including 6.8% of those under age 18 and 8.6% of those age 65 or over.
