= Manannah, Minnesota =

- Unincorporated community
- Location within Minnesota Location within the United States
- Coordinates: 45°15′13″N 94°37′03″W
- Country: United States
- State: Minnesota
- County: Meeker
- Township: Manannah
- Elevation: 1,155 ft (352 m)
- Time zone: UTC-6 (Central (CST))
  - Summer (DST): UTC-5 (CDT)
- ZIP code: 55329 and 56243
- Area code: 320
- GNIS feature ID: 647430

Manannah is an unincorporated community in Manannah Township, Meeker County, Minnesota, United States. The community is located near the junction of Meeker County Roads 3 and 30. Nearby places include Eden Valley, Grove City, Paynesville, and Litchfield. State Highways 4 (MN 4) and 22 (MN 22) are also in the immediate area.

== History ==
Historical population
Census	Pop.	Note	%±
1880	114		—
U.S. Decennial Census

Manannah was platted in 1856, and again in 1871, and supposedly named after a place in Scotland. A post office was established at Manannah in 1857, and remained in operation until 1907.
