= Philip J. Palm =

American politician (1906–1959)

Philip J. Palm (June 9, 1906 – May 13, 1959) was an American newspaper editor and politician.

Palm was born in Litchfield, Meeker County, Minnesota and graduated from Litchfield High School, He served in the United States Army during World War II. He graduated from the University of Minnesota with a bachelor's degree in journalism and from Hamline University in 1930. Palm served as the Meeker County Assessor from 1932 to 1934. He was a newspaper editor of the Meeker County News and a journalist. Palm lived in Litchfield with his wife. Palm served in the Minnesota Senate from 1951 to 1954 and was a Democrat. Palm died in Litchfield, Minnesota.
