= Acton Township, Meeker County, Minnesota =

Acton Township, Minnesota
- Township
- Location within the state of Minnesota Acton Township, Minnesota (the United States)
- Coordinates: 45°8′N 94°41′W
- Country: United States
- State: Minnesota
- County: Meeker

Area
  - Total: 35.4 sq mi (91.7 km^{2})
  - Land: 33.1 sq mi (85.6 km^{2})
  - Water: 2.4 sq mi (6.2 km^{2})
- Elevation: 1,194 ft (364 m)

Population (2000)
  - Total: 381
  - Density: 12/sq mi (4.5/km^{2})
- Time zone: UTC-6 (Central (CST))
  - Summer (DST): UTC-5 (CDT)
- FIPS code: 27-00154
- GNIS feature ID: 0663377

Acton Township (/ˈæktən/ AK-tən) is a township in Meeker County, Minnesota, United States. The population was 381 at the 2000 census. The township includes almost all of Grove City.

== Geography ==
According to the United States Census Bureau, the township has a total area of 35.4 square miles (92 km^{2}), of which 33.0 square miles (85 km^{2}) is land and 2.4 square miles (6.2 km^{2}) (6.72%) is water.

Acton Township is located in Township 119 North of the Arkansas Base Line and Range 32 West of the 5th Principal Meridian.

== Demographics ==
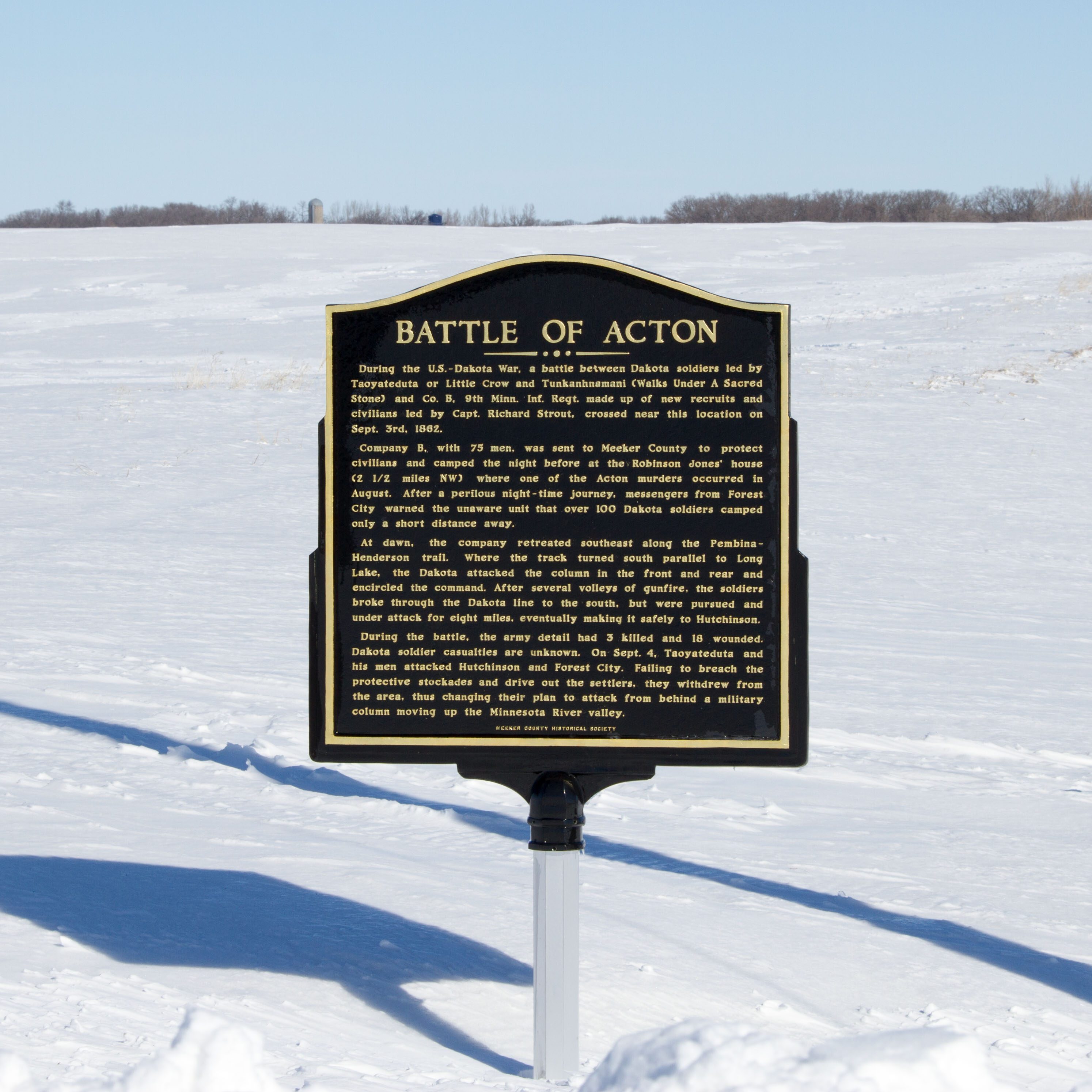
A historical marker regarding the Battle of Acton which took place during the Dakota War.

As of the census of 2000, there were 381 people, 156 households, and 112 families residing in the township. The population density was 11.5 people per square mile (4.5/km^{2}). There were 182 housing units at an average density of 5.5/sq mi (2.1/km^{2}). The racial makeup of the township was 98.43% White, 0.26% Native American, 0.52% Asian, 0.79% from other races. Hispanic or Latino of any race were 0.79% of the population.

There were 156 households, out of which 28.8% had children under the age of 18 living with them, 64.7% were married couples living together, 5.1% had a female householder with no husband present, and 28.2% were non-families. 26.9% of all households were made up of individuals, and 7.1% had someone living alone who was 65 years of age or older. The average household size was 2.44 and the average family size was 2.96.

In the township the population was spread out, with 24.7% under the age of 18, 5.5% from 18 to 24, 28.9% from 25 to 44, 28.9% from 45 to 64, and 12.1% who were 65 years of age or older. The median age was 40 years. For every 100 females, there were 108.2 males. For every 100 females age 18 and over, there were 106.5 males.

The median income for a household in the township was $37,813, and the median income for a family was $46,750. Males had a median income of $31,667 versus $26,000 for females. The per capita income for the township was $16,502. About 9.5% of families and 9.1% of the population were below the poverty line, including 3.7% of those under age 18 and 24.4% of those age 65 or over.

== History ==
Acton Township was organized in 1858, and named after Acton, Ontario.

Acton Township was the location of the Battle of Acton on September 3, 1862, part of the Dakota War. The nearby murder of five white settlers by a Dakota hunting party in the Acton Incident sparked the war.
