= Ness Lutheran Church =

Church in Minnesota, United States

- Ness Lutheran Church and Cemetery
- U.S. National Register of Historic Places
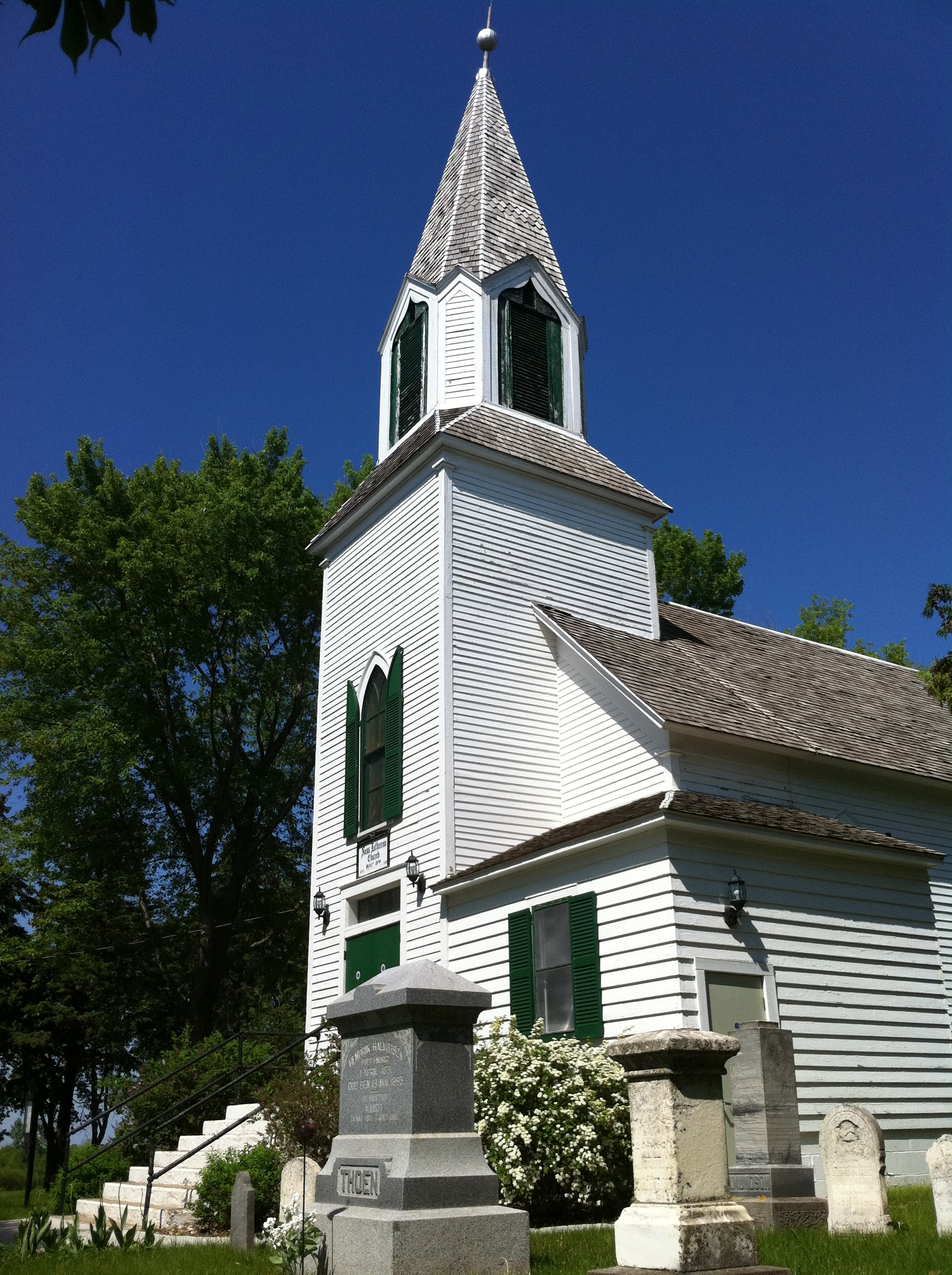
- Ness Lutheran Church
- Location: 24040 580th Avenue, Litchfield, Minnesota
- Coordinates: 45.09543°N 94.60428°W
- Area: 2.1 acres (0.85 ha)
- NRHP reference No.: 100011871
- Added to NRHP: May 20, 2025

Ness Lutheran Church is a historic church in Litchfield, Minnesota on the National Register of Historic Places.

== History ==
Early settlers arrived to Meeker County from Rock County, Wisconsin in July 1856. They organized the community cemetery and the St. Johannes Lutheran Congregation of Meeker and Surrounding Counties at the home of Ole. H. Ness. The congregation was reorganized in 1861 was the Ness Norwegian Lutheran Church of Meeker County. The church also "planted" more than 20 other Norwegian Lutheran congregations during its active years.

The church is a single-story simplified basilica plan church with a bell tower and is an intact example of Norwegian American Lutheran church design in the Carpenter Gothic Style. The interior was completed in 1868. The church property also includes two historic outhouses. The original bell from 1898 remains functional. Inside, there is elaborate alter artwork entitled "See Jesus Receiving the Sinner" which was commissioned in 1896 and completed by Minneapolis artist Sarah Ragland in 1898.

The congregation voted to disband in 1964 due to loss of members.

The Ole Ness farmhouse, the original site of the church, was moved to the church property in 2001. The upper story was used by the church for worship between 1862 and 1874. The house is maintained as a museum.

The cemetery holds roughly 367 interments from 1858 to 2021 and includes families of the founding members of the church.

In 1970, the site was recognized by the Minnesota Historical Society. In 2025, the Ness Lutheran Church and Cemetery was added to the National Register of Historic Places.

== Ness monument ==
A state monument erected in 1878 marks the mass grave for the first five white deaths in the U.S.-Dakota War of 1862. The five settlers were killed at the Baker cabin at Acton in 1862.

== Ghost hunting ==
In 2015, ghost hunters broke into Ness Church and damaged windows and a monument. Ghost enthusiasts say the site is haunted, contrary to the beliefs of church board members.
