= Litchfield, Minnesota =

City in Minnesota, United States

- City
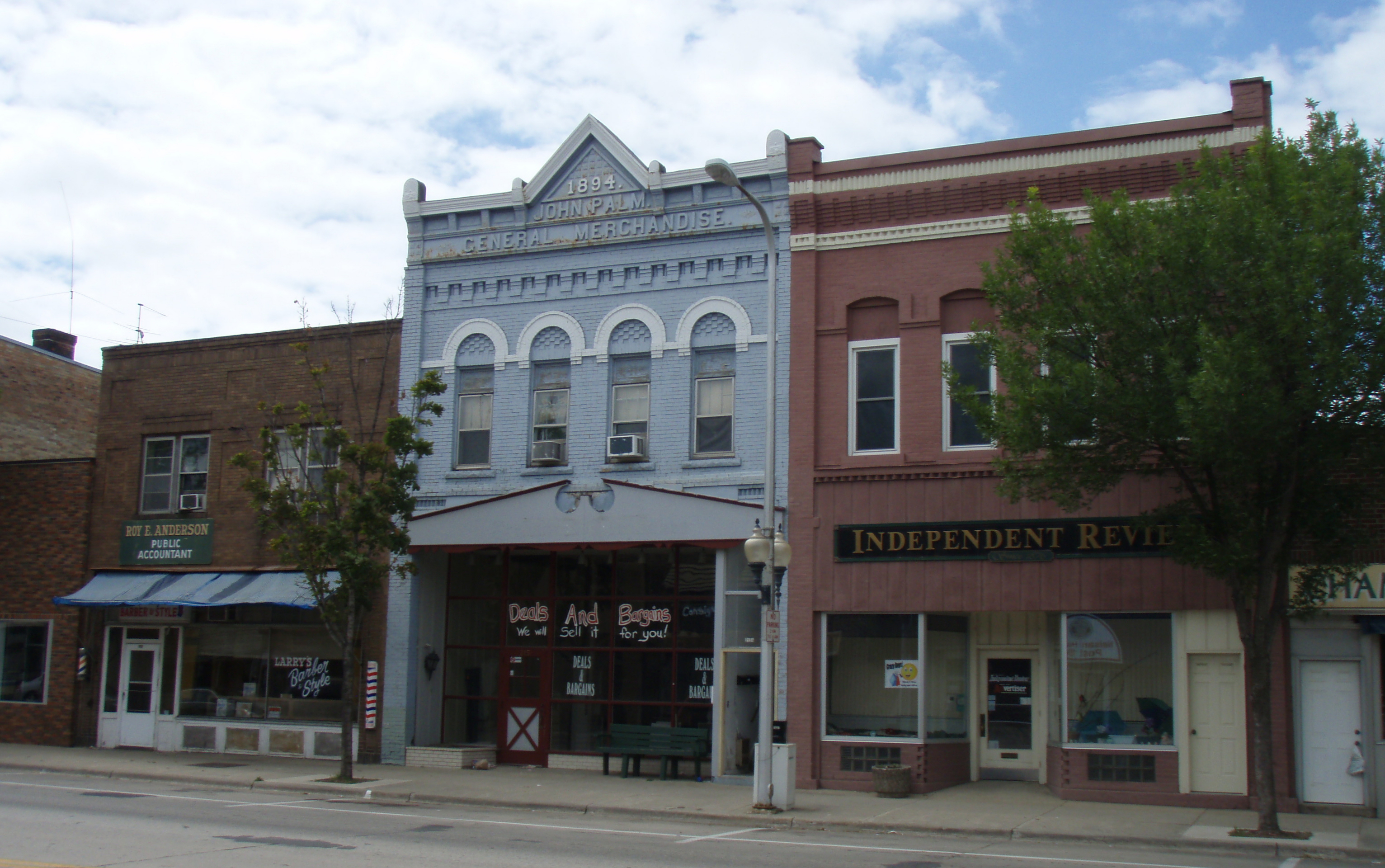
- The Litchfield Commercial Historic District

- Location in Meeker County and the state of Minnesota
- Coordinates: 45°07′34″N 94°31′30″W
- Country: United States
- State: Minnesota
- County: Meeker
- Platted: 1869
- Incorporated: February 29, 1872

Government
  - Mayor: Ron Dingmann

Area
  - Total: 5.45 sq mi (14.12 km^{2})
  - Land: 4.47 sq mi (11.59 km^{2})
  - Water: 0.98 sq mi (2.53 km^{2})
- Elevation: 1,132 ft (345 m)

Population (2020)
  - Total: 6,624
  - Estimate (2022): 6,602
  - Density: 1,480.0/sq mi (571.44/km^{2})
- Time zone: UTC−6 (Central (CST))
  - Summer (DST): UTC−5 (CDT)
- ZIP code: 55355
- Area code: 320
- FIPS code: 27-37448
- GNIS feature ID: 2395732
- Sales tax: 7.375%
- Website: ci.litchfield.mn.us

Litchfield is a city in and the county seat of Meeker County, Minnesota, United States. The population was 6,624 at the 2020 census.

== History ==
Immigration to the county was slow until the St. Paul, Minneapolis, and Manitoba Railroad, later called the St. Paul and Pacific and then the Great Northern, started coming through the area in 1869. The first train to arrive was a construction train on August 13, 1869.

The town site was laid out in 1869, with agriculture and agriculture-related industries making up a large base of the economy.

The town's first post office opened in a home on September 20, 1869. It later moved to the northwest corner of Sibley Avenue and Second Street, to a clothing store owned by the town's first official postmaster.

=== Town name ===
The settlers living in the area named their new community "Ness" on April 5, 1858, after the home of many of the first settlers: the parish of Næs in the traditional region of Hallingdal, Norway.

Litchfield got its name from a man named Electus Bachus Darwin Litchfield. He was a contractor, an investor, and a stockholder in the St. Paul and Pacific Railroad, which originally went from St. Paul to St. Cloud and was built from 1862 to 1864. Later, his investments provided the means for building a more southern line through Meeker County to Breckenridge.

The village of Litchfield was originally called several different names, including "Round Lake", "Ripley", and finally "Ness". Litchfield was originally a portion of a congressional township named Round Lake, but most people called it Ripley after Ripley Lake one mile from its center.

The people of Ness were permitted to vote on the actual chartered village name of their township. Electus Litchfield donated grants of $2,000 each to various religious sects in town to build churches, the Episcopal and Presbyterian churches being two of them. The Presbyterian Church, Litchfield's first church, was built in 1870.

The majority of the 350 people voted for the name Litchfield over Ness, and the township of Litchfield was chartered as a village on February 29, 1872. The first village council meeting was held on April 5, 1872, in the railroad's land office. Jesse Vawter Branham, Jr. was elected the President of the Council.

=== Early history as village ===
By 1871, the village had grown to double the population of Forest City, a community 7 miles (11 km) to the northeast. The railroad put up a 25-by-60-foot (7.6 by 18.3 m) one-story building called an "immigrant's reception house". In addition to Litchfield, the railroad in the 1870s put immigrant houses along its lines in villages including Willmar, Benson, Morris, and Breckenridge. The houses were "fitted up with cooking stoves, washing conveniences, and beds." Newly arriving immigrants were given shelter in the reception houses and the chance to buy food and clothing at cost from the railroad while they looked for land in the area.

While most sidewalks in town were made of wood, the first cement sidewalk in Litchfield was laid in 1895 in the 200 block of Sibley Avenue.

=== Early history as city ===
The village of Litchfield incorporated as a city in 1943.

== Geography ==
Litchfield is in the center of Meeker County. U.S. Highway 12 and Minnesota State Highways 22 and 24 are three of the main routes in the city. US 12 leads east 17 miles (27 km) to Cokato and west 30 miles (48 km) to Willmar; MN 22 leads north 24 miles (39 km) to Richmond and south-southeast 21 miles (34 km) to Hutchinson, and MN 24 leads north 22 miles (35 km) to Kimball. Minneapolis is 66 miles (106 km) to the east via US 12.

According to the U.S. Census Bureau, the city of Litchfield has a total area of 5.45 square miles (14.12 km^{2}), of which 4.48 square miles (11.60 km^{2}) are land and 0.98 square miles (2.54 km^{2}), or 17.92%, are water. The city limits include all of Lake Ripley, a natural lake to the southwest. Jewitts Creek drains the city to the north, leading to the North Fork of the Crow River upstream from Forest City.

=== Climate ===
Climate data for Litchfield, Minnesota, 1991–2020 normals, extremes 1907–present
Month	Jan	Feb	Mar	Apr	May	Jun	Jul	Aug	Sep	Oct	Nov	Dec	Year
Record high °F (°C)	60 (16)	60 (16)	81 (27)	93 (34)	97 (36)	101 (38)	104 (40)	104 (40)	98 (37)	90 (32)	87 (31)	62 (17)	104 (40)
Mean maximum °F (°C)	40.5 (4.7)	43.8 (6.6)	60.8 (16.0)	77.6 (25.3)	87.4 (30.8)	91.0 (32.8)	91.1 (32.8)	89.7 (32.1)	86.7 (30.4)	80.4 (26.9)	60.6 (15.9)	44.1 (6.7)	94.0 (34.4)
Mean daily maximum °F (°C)	20.1 (−6.6)	24.8 (−4.0)	37.4 (3.0)	53.3 (11.8)	66.5 (19.2)	76.8 (24.9)	81.2 (27.3)	78.7 (25.9)	71.1 (21.7)	56.4 (13.6)	39.7 (4.3)	25.5 (−3.6)	52.6 (11.5)
Daily mean °F (°C)	10.0 (−12.2)	14.2 (−9.9)	27.2 (−2.7)	42.5 (5.8)	55.6 (13.1)	66.4 (19.1)	70.7 (21.5)	68.2 (20.1)	59.7 (15.4)	45.3 (7.4)	30.3 (−0.9)	16.5 (−8.6)	42.2 (5.7)
Mean daily minimum °F (°C)	−0.2 (−17.9)	3.6 (−15.8)	16.9 (−8.4)	31.6 (−0.2)	44.8 (7.1)	56.0 (13.3)	60.2 (15.7)	57.7 (14.3)	48.3 (9.1)	34.2 (1.2)	20.9 (−6.2)	7.4 (−13.7)	31.8 (−0.1)
Mean minimum °F (°C)	−19.1 (−28.4)	−15.0 (−26.1)	−4.3 (−20.2)	18.5 (−7.5)	32.3 (0.2)	44.0 (6.7)	50.9 (10.5)	48.1 (8.9)	34.0 (1.1)	21.1 (−6.1)	5.4 (−14.8)	−12.2 (−24.6)	−22.0 (−30.0)
Record low °F (°C)	−37 (−38)	−37 (−38)	−32 (−36)	−1 (−18)	19 (−7)	26 (−3)	41 (5)	37 (3)	23 (−5)	11 (−12)	−17 (−27)	−34 (−37)	−37 (−38)
Average precipitation inches (mm)	0.78 (20)	0.78 (20)	1.48 (38)	2.65 (67)	3.72 (94)	4.58 (116)	3.81 (97)	4.08 (104)	3.04 (77)	2.56 (65)	1.35 (34)	0.95 (24)	29.78 (756)
Average snowfall inches (cm)	9.3 (24)	6.7 (17)	7.7 (20)	3.4 (8.6)	0.0 (0.0)	0.0 (0.0)	0.0 (0.0)	0.0 (0.0)	0.0 (0.0)	0.3 (0.76)	6.8 (17)	6.5 (17)	40.7 (104.36)
Average precipitation days (≥ 0.01 in)	4.8	3.4	4.4	6.9	7.9	8.5	8.4	7.3	7.5	5.7	4.2	4.0	73.0
Average snowy days (≥ 0.1 in)	4.9	3.1	2.4	1.0	0.1	0.0	0.0	0.0	0.0	0.2	2.4	4.0	18.1
Source 1: NOAA
Source 2: National Weather Service

== Demographics ==
Historical population
Census	Pop.	Note	%±
1870	353		—
1880	1,250		254.1%
1890	1,899		51.9%
1900	2,280		20.1%
1910	2,333		2.3%
1920	2,790		19.6%
1930	2,880		3.2%
1940	3,920		36.1%
1950	4,608		17.6%
1960	5,078		10.2%
1970	5,262		3.6%
1980	5,904		12.2%
1990	6,041		2.3%
2000	6,562		8.6%
2010	6,574		0.2%
2020	6,624		0.8%
2022 (est.)	6,602		−0.3%
U.S. Decennial Census; 2020 Census

=== 2020 census ===
As of the 2020 census, Litchfield had a population of 6,624. The median age was 41.4 years. 23.2% of residents were under the age of 18 and 21.9% of residents were 65 years of age or older. For every 100 females there were 97.0 males, and for every 100 females age 18 and over there were 94.3 males age 18 and over.

98.0% of residents lived in urban areas, while 2.0% lived in rural areas.

There were 2,713 households in Litchfield, of which 27.8% had children under the age of 18 living in them. Of all households, 44.7% were married-couple households, 19.4% were households with a male householder and no spouse or partner present, and 27.8% were households with a female householder and no spouse or partner present. About 33.2% of all households were made up of individuals and 16.1% had someone living alone who was 65 years of age or older.

There were 2,898 housing units, of which 6.4% were vacant. The homeowner vacancy rate was 1.2% and the rental vacancy rate was 8.8%.

Racial composition as of the 2020 census
Race	Number	Percent
White	5,877	88.7%
Black or African American	55	0.8%
American Indian and Alaska Native	19	0.3%
Asian	15	0.2%
Native Hawaiian and Other Pacific Islander	4	0.1%
Some other race	260	3.9%
Two or more races	394	5.9%
Hispanic or Latino (of any race)	595	9.0%

=== 2010 census ===
As of the census of 2010, there were 6,726 people, 2,747 households, and 1,749 families residing in the city. The population density was 1,518.3 inhabitants per square mile (586.2/km^{2}). There were 2,930 housing units at an average density of 661.4 per square mile (255.4/km^{2}). The racial makeup of the city was 95.8% White, 0.5% African American, 0.1% Native American, 0.1% Asian, 2.6% from other races, and 0.8% from two or more races. Hispanic or Latino of any race were 7.2% of the population.

There were 2,747 households, of which 30.8% had children under the age of 18 living with them, 48.4% were married couples living together, 10.7% had a female householder with no husband present, 4.6% had a male householder with no wife present, and 36.3% were non-families. 32.0% of all households were made up of individuals, and 16.1% had someone living alone who was 65 years of age or older. The average household size was 2.37 and the average family size was 2.98.

The median age in the city was 39.6 years. 24.9% of residents were under the age of 18; 7.3% were between the ages of 18 and 24; 23.9% were from 25 to 44; 25.6% were from 45 to 64; and 18.4% were 65 years of age or older. The gender makeup of the city was 48.8% male and 51.2% female.

== Notable people ==
- Bernie Bierman (1894–1977), Minnesota Gophers football coach
- Florence Riddick Boys (1873–1963), Indiana journalist, suffragist; born in Litchfield
- John Carlson, Jr. (1984– ), football player
- Herbert W. Chilstrom (1931–2020), Presiding Bishop (1987–95) of the Evangelical Lutheran Church in America
- John W. Foss (1931–2020), US Army four-star general
- Peter E. Hanson (1845–1914), politician and businessman
- Ann D. Montgomery (1949– ), federal judge of the United States District Court for the District of Minnesota
- William A. Nolen (1928–1986), surgeon and author
- Philip J. Palm (1906–1959), newspaper editor and politician
- Wally Pikal (1927–2017), musician and entertainer
- Michael Shaw (1944– ), first open heart surgery survivor
- Gale Sondergaard (1899–1985), Academy Award-winning actress (1936)
- Hester Sondergaard (1903–1994), radio character actress

== Historic sites ==
- The Grand Army of the Republic Hall (G.A.R.) was founded in 1885 by Civil War veterans, who called themselves the "Boys of '61". Membership was limited to Union veterans of the Civil War; their motto was "Fraternity, Charity, and Loyalty". The hall remains exactly as it was when the "Boys of '61" met there. The Litchfield G.A.R. Hall is one of very few left in the nation and the only authentic one remaining in Minnesota. The G.A.R. Hall was added to the National Register of Historic Places on May 21, 1975.
- The Litchfield Commercial Historic District is an unusually intact business district of a small Midwestern agricultural trade center of the late 19th and early 20th centuries, with 36 contributing properties mostly built between 1882 and 1940.
- The Henry Ames House was built in 1888–89 by area pioneer Henry Ames. The house is the only original structure that remains from what was known as the Litchfield Brickyard that operated during the years of 1883–1900. The house was added to the National Register of Historic Places on August 9, 1984.
- The Litchfield Opera House was built in 1900. The building is a darling of St. Paul architect William T. Towner, who designed it with a unique "Renaissance Revival" façade. Considered a jewel on the prairie, many people came to watch the performances of the traveling shows that came to the Opera House. The Litchfield Opera House was added to the National Register of Historic Places on October 4, 1984.
- The Little Red Schoolhouse District 59 was built in 1913 on an acre of land 6 miles (10 km) south of Litchfield. The architecture is a classic revival-style featuring a single story, red brick exterior, hip roof, and eight white Doric columns, and was constructed at a cost of $3,500.
- Manannah (Union) Century Church, called Manannah Union Church when it was built in 1897, relied on traveling pastors to lead its flock. When membership dwindled in 1985, the church closed its doors. Esther Hegg, a longtime parishioner, bought the church at an auction. Hegg then led the charge to move the church to the Meeker County Fairgrounds in Litchfield, where it stands today.
- Ness Church was organized in 1861. It is one of the state's oldest historical sites and the first organized church in Meeker County. Buried in its cemetery are the first five victims of the Dakota War.
- Trinity Episcopal Church, founded in 1871, was entered into the National Register of Historic Places on June 20, 1975. The architecture of the church is attributed to Richard Upjohn, an architect from New York known for Carpenter Gothic designs. Upjohn founded the American Institute of Architects and served as its first president. The door and side entry bell tower, lancet windows, and batten walls are typical characteristics of Carpenter Gothic architecture.
