= List of Irish place names in other countries =

The following places in countries other than Ireland are named after places in Ireland.

Massive emigration, often called the Irish diaspora, from Ireland in the 19th and 20th centuries resulted in many towns and regions being named or renamed after places in Ireland.

The following place names sometimes share strong ties with the original place name. Places named for Irish words but which are not current or historical places in Ireland are excluded.

== Common placenames in multiple countries ==
=== Antrim ===
- Antrim, New Hampshire
- Antrim, Nova Scotia
- Antrim, Ohio
- Antrim, Pennsylvania
- Antrim County, Michigan
- Antrim Township, Pennsylvania
- Antrim Township, Michigan
- Antrim Township, Wyandot County, Ohio

=== Athlone ===
- Athlone, California
- Athlone, Victoria
- Athlone Park, South Africa

=== Avoca ===
- Avoca, Arkansas
- Avoca, Florida
- Avoca, Indiana
- Avoca, Iowa
- Avoca, Minnesota
- Avoca, Nebraska
- Avoca, New South Wales
- Avoca, New York
- Avoca, New Zealand
- Avoca, Pennsylvania
- Avoca, Queensland
- Avoca, South Africa
- Avoca, Tasmania
- Avoca, Victoria
- Avoca, West Virginia
- Avoca, Wisconsin
- Avoca Beach, New South Wales
- Avoca Lake, New South Wales
- Avoca River, Canterbury, New Zealand
- Avoca River, Hawke's Bay, New Zealand
- Avoca River, Victoria
- Avoca Township, Livingston County, Illinois
- North Avoca, New South Wales

=== Bandon ===
- Bandon, Indiana
- Bandon, Oregon
- Bandon Township, Renville County, Minnesota
- New Bandon Parish, New Brunswick
- New Bandon-Salmon Beach, New Brunswick

=== Belfast ===
- Belfast, Clermont County, Ohio
- Belfast, Georgia
- Belfast, Highland County, Ohio
- Belfast, Maine
- Belfast, Missouri
- Belfast, Mpumalanga
- Belfast, Nebraska
- Belfast, New York
- Belfast, New Zealand
- Belfast, Pennsylvania
- Belfast, Prince Edward Island
- Belfast, Tennessee
- Belfast Township, Fulton County, Pennsylvania
- Belfast Township, Murray County, Minnesota

=== Cashel ===
- Cashel, Ontario
- Cashel Township, Swift County, Minnesota
- Tudor and Cashel Township, Ontario

=== Cavan ===
- Cavan, New South Wales
- Cavan Monaghan, Ontario
- Cavan, South Australia

=== Clare ===
- Clare, Iowa
- Clare, Nova Scotia
- Clare, South Australia
- Clare County, Michigan
- Clare Valley, South Australia
- Point Clare, New South Wales

=== Clontarf ===
- Clontarf, Minnesota
- Clontarf, New South Wales
- Clontarf, Queensland (Moreton Bay Region)
- Clontarf, Queensland (Toowoomba Region)

=== Coleraine/Colerain ===
- Colerain, North Carolina
- Colerain, Ohio
- Colerain Township, Bedford County, Pennsylvania
- Colerain Township, Belmont County, Ohio
- Colerain Township, Hamilton County, Ohio
- Colerain Township, Lancaster County, Pennsylvania
- Colerain Township, Ross County, Ohio
- Coleraine, Victoria
- Saint-Joseph-de-Coleraine, Quebec

=== Dublin ===
- Dublin, Banana Islands
- Dublin, California
- Dublin, Florida
- Dublin, Georgia
- Dublin, Indiana
- Dublin, Kentucky
- Dublin, Maryland
- Dublin, Missouri
- Dublin, New Hampshire
- Dublin, North Carolina
- Dublin, Ohio
- Dublin, Pennsylvania
- Dublin, South Australia
- Dublin, Texas
- Dublin, Virginia
- Dublin Township, Swift County, Minnesota
- Dublin Township, Mercer County, Ohio
- Dublin Township, Fulton County, Pennsylvania
- Dublin Township, Huntingdon County, Pennsylvania
- Upper Dublin Township, Pennsylvania

=== Erin ===
(anglicised version of Éire, meaning Ireland)

- Erin, New York
- Erin, Ontario
- Erin, Tennessee
- Erin, Texas
- Erin, Wisconsin
- Port Erin, Isle of Man

=== Ireland ===
- Ireland, Indiana
- Ireland, Nova Scotia
- Ireland, West Virginia
- New Ireland, Papua New Guinea

=== Kildare ===
- Kildare, Edmonton, Alberta (neighborhood)
- Kildare, Oklahoma
- Kildare, Texas
- Kildare, Wisconsin
- Saint-Ambroise-de-Kildare, Quebec
- Sainte-Marcelline-de-Kildare, Quebec
- Kildare Township, Minnesota

=== Kilkenny ===
- Kilkenny, Edmonton, Alberta (neighborhood)
- Kilkenny, Minnesota
- Kilkenny, New Hampshire
- Kilkenny, South Australia
- Kilkenny Township, Le Sueur County, Minnesota

=== Killarney ===
- Killarney, Edmonton, Alberta (neighborhood)
- Killarney, Florida
- Killarney, Gauteng
- Killarney, Georgia
- Killarney, Manitoba
- Killarney, Ontario
- Killarney, Queensland
- Killarney, Vancouver, British Columbia (neighborhood)
- Killarney, Victoria
- Killarney, Zimbabwe
- Killarney Heights, New South Wales
- Killarney Station, Northern Territory, Australia
- Killarney Vale, New South Wales

=== Limerick ===
- Limerick, Georgia
- Limerick, Louisville, Kentucky (neighborhood)
- Limerick, Maine
- Limerick, New South Wales
- Limerick, New York
- Limerick, Ohio
- Limerick, Ontario
- Limerick, Saskatchewan
- Limerick Township, Pennsylvania

=== Londonderry ===
- Londonderry, Edmonton, Alberta (neighborhood)
- Londonderry, Guernsey County, Ohio
- Londonderry, New Hampshire
- Londonderry, New South Wales
- Londonderry, Nova Scotia
- Londonderry, Ross County, Ohio
- Londonderry, Western Australia
- Londonderry, West Midlands
- Londonderry Township, Bedford County, Pennsylvania
- Londonderry Township, Chester County, Pennsylvania
- Londonderry Township, Dauphin County, Pennsylvania
- Londonderry Township, Ohio
- North Londonderry Township, Pennsylvania
- South Londonderry Township, Pennsylvania

=== Longford ===
- Longford, Kansas
- Longford, Tasmania

=== Munster ===
- Munster, Ontario
- Munster Township, Pennsylvania

=== Tyrone ===
- Lower Tyrone Township, Pennsylvania
- Tyrone, Coshocton County, Ohio
- Tyrone, Georgia
- Tyrone, Kentucky
- Tyrone, Morrow County, Ohio
- Tyrone, New Mexico
- Tyrone, New York
- Tyrone, Ontario
- Tyrone, Pennsylvania
- Tyrone Township, Adams County, Pennsylvania
- Tyrone Township, Blair County, Pennsylvania
- Tyrone Township, Perry County, Pennsylvania
- Upper Tyrone Township, Fayette County, Pennsylvania

=== Waterford ===
- New Waterford, Nova Scotia
- New Waterford, Ohio
- Waterford, Pennsylvania
- Waterford, Queensland
- Waterford West, Queensland
- Waterford, Rhode Island
- Waterford, Vermont
- Waterford, Virginia
- Waterford, Western Australia
- Waterford Parish, New Brunswick

=== Wexford ===
- Wexford, Pennsylvania
- Wexford, Toronto, Ontario (neighborhood)
- Wexford County, Michigan

== Africa ==
=== Sierra Leone ===
- Dublin

=== South Africa ===
- Bantry Bay
- Belfast
- Killarney

=== Zimbabwe ===
- Killarney

== United Kingdom (excluding Northern Ireland) ==
=== England ===
- Beckery, Somerset (from Bec Eriu, Old Irish for "Little Ireland"; the name was likely brought to England by an Irishman recruited by Vikings)
- Londonderry, West Midlands

=== Scotland ===
The following come from the Scottish Gaelic Èireann meaning 'Ireland':

- Auldearn (Allt Èireann)
- Bridge of Earn (Drochaid Èireann)
- Findhorn (Inbhir Èireann)
- Loch Earn (Loch Èireann)
- Lochearnhead (Ceann Loch Èireann)
- Strathearn (Srath Èireann)

The following come from Fódla, Banbha and Eilg, which are poetic names for Ireland:

- Atholl (Athfhotla)
- Banff (Banbha)
- Elgin (Eilginn)
- Glenelg (Gleann Eilg)

== Canada ==
=== Alberta ===
- Ardenode
- Bantry
- Connemara
- Innisfree
- Kildare
- Kilkenny
- Killarney
- Londonderry
- Mount Dungarvan

=== British Columbia ===
- Belcarra
- Killarney

=== Manitoba ===
- Killarney

=== New Brunswick ===
- New Bandon Parish
- New Bandon-Salmon Beach
- Waterford Parish
- Wicklow
- Wicklow Parish

=== Newfoundland and Labrador ===
- Ballyhack

=== Nova Scotia ===
- Antrim
- Clare
- Ireland
- Londonderry
- New Waterford

=== Ontario ===
- Ballycroy, Adjala-Tosorontio
- Carlingford
- Carlow/Mayo
- Cashel
- Cavan Monaghan
- Corktown, Toronto
- Dundalk
- Dublin
- Erin
- Erindale
- Fingal
- Killaloe
- Killarney
- Kilrush
- Leitrim
- Limerick
- Listowel
- Malahide
- Maynooth
- Munster
- Navan
- South Monaghan
- Tramore
- Tudor and Cashel
- Tullamore
- Tyrone
- Westmeath
- Wexford

=== Prince Edward Island ===
- Belfast

=== Quebec ===
- Armagh
- Mayo
- Saint-Ambroise-de-Kildare
- Saint-Joseph-de-Coleraine
- Sainte-Marcelline-de-Kildare

=== Saskatchewan ===
- Limerick
- Meath Park
- Mullingar

== United States ==
=== Arkansas ===
- Avoca

=== California ===
- Athlone
- Dublin
- Menlo Park

=== Colorado ===
- Sligo

=== Florida ===
- Avoca
- Killarney

=== Georgia ===
- Belfast
- Cork
- Dublin
- Killarney
- Limerick
- Tyrone

=== Idaho ===
- Rathdrum

=== Illinois ===
- Avoca Township
- Derry Township

=== Indiana ===
- Avoca
- Bandon
- Dublin
- Ireland

=== Iowa ===
- Avoca
- Clare
- Menlo

=== Kansas ===
- Clonmel
- Longford

=== Kentucky ===
- Dublin
- Limerick
- Tyrone

=== Maine ===
- Belfast
- Limerick
- Newry

=== Maryland ===
- Dublin
- Dundalk
- Sligo Creek

=== Massachusetts ===
- Charlemont

=== Michigan ===
- Antrim County
- Antrim Township
- Clare County
- Corktown
- Roscommon County
- Wexford County

=== Minnesota ===
- Avoca
- Bandon Township
- Belfast Township
- Cashel Township
- Clontarf
- Dublin Township
- Fermoy
- Glendalough State Park
- Kildare Township
- Kilkenny
- Kilkenny Township
- Newry Township
- Rosemount
- Tara Township, Swift County
- Tara Township, Traverse County

=== Missouri ===
- Belfast
- Dublin

=== Nebraska ===
- Avoca
- Belfast

=== New Hampshire ===
- Antrim
- Derry
- Dublin
- Kilkenny
- Londonderry

=== New Mexico ===
- Derry
- Tyrone

=== New York ===
- Avoca
- Belfast
- Erin
- Limerick
- Tipperary Hill, Syracuse
- Tyrone
- Ulster County

=== North Carolina ===
- Colerain
- Dublin
- Mount Mourne
- Shannon

=== North Dakota ===
- Bantry
- Kenmare

=== Ohio ===
- Antrim
- Antrim Township
- Belfast, Clermont County
- Belfast, Highland County
- Colerain
- Colerain Township, Belmont County
- Colerain Township, Hamilton County
- Colerain Township, Ross County
- Dublin
- Dublin Township
- Limerick
- Londonderry, Guernsey County
- Londonderry, Ross County
- Londonderry Township
- New Waterford
- Tyrone, Coshocton County
- Tyrone, Morrow County

=== Oklahoma ===
- Kildare

=== Oregon ===
- Bandon

=== Pennsylvania ===
- Antrim
- Antrim Township
- Armagh
- Armagh Township
- Avoca
- Avonmore
- Belfast
- Belfast Township
- Colerain Township, Bedford County
- Colerain Township, Lancaster County
- Derry
- Derry Township, Dauphin County
- Derry Township, Mifflin County
- Derry Township, Montour County
- Derry Township, Westmoreland County
- Donegal
- Donegal Township, Butler County
- Donegal Township, Washington County
- Donegal Township, Westmoreland County
- Drumore Township/East Drumore Township
- Dublin
- Dublin Township, Fulton County
- Dublin Township, Huntingdon County
- Duncannon
- East Donegal Township/West Donegal Township
- Fermanagh Township
- Letterkenny Township
- Limerick Township
- Lisburn
- Londonderry Township, Bedford County
- Londonderry Township, Chester County
- Londonderry Township, Dauphin County
- Lower Tyrone Township/Upper Tyrone Township
- Lurgan Township
- Monaghan Township
- Munster Township
- Newry
- North Londonderry Township/South Londonderry Township
- North Strabane Township/South Strabane Township
- Sligo
- Tyrone
- Tyrone Township, Adams County
- Tyrone Township, Blair County
- Tyrone Township, Perry County
- Ulster Township
- Upper Dublin Township
- Waterford
- Wexford

=== Rhode Island ===
- Waterford

=== South Carolina ===
- Newry

=== Tennessee ===
- Belfast
- Erin

=== Texas ===
- Dublin
- Erin
- Kildare
- Shannon

=== Vermont ===
- Waterford

=== Virginia ===
- Dublin
- Dungannon
- Kinsale
- Waterford

=== West Virginia ===
- Avoca
- Ireland
- Tralee

=== Wisconsin ===
- Avoca
- Erin
- Kildare

== Australia ==
=== New South Wales ===
- Avoca
- Avoca Beach
- Avoca Lake
- Ballina
- Bantry Bay
- Carlingford
- Cavan
- Clontarf
- Dunmore
- Killarney Heights
- Killarney Vale
- Limerick
- Londonderry
- Louth
- North Avoca
- Point Clare
- Rathmines
- Tralee
- Tullamore

=== Queensland ===
- Charleville
- Clontarf (Moreton Bay)
- Clontarf (Toowoomba Region)
- Derrymore
- Glanmire
- Innisfail
- Kerry
- Killaloe
- Killarney
- Mount Enniskillen
- Rathdowney
- Waterford
- Waterford West

=== South Australia ===
- Armagh
- Cavan
- Clare
- Clare Valley
- Dublin
- Erindale
- Glandore
- Kilkenny
- Rostrevor

=== Tasmania ===
- Howth
- Liffey
- Liffey River Reserve
- Longford

=== Victoria ===
- Athlone
- Avoca River
- Cape Clear
- Coleraine
- Drumcondra
- Killarney
- Kilmore
- Maryborough
- Newry
- Portarlington

=== Western Australia ===
- Glendalough
- Londonderry
- Mullingar
- Waterford

== New Zealand ==
- Avoca
- Avoca River (Canterbury)
- Avoca River (Hawke's Bay)
- Belfast
- Westport

== Papua New Guinea ==
- New Ireland

== Chile ==
- Vallenar (founded as San Ambrosio de Ballenary, after Ballynary in County Sligo)

== Jamaica ==
- Ulster Spring

== Montserrat ==
- Cork Hill, Saint Anthony Parish

== Beyond Earth ==
- Beltra crater, Mars
- Clogh crater, Mars
- Conamara Chaos Zone, Europa
- Dromore crater, Mars
- Fenagh crater, Mars
- Glendore crater, Mars
- Lismore crater, Mars
- Louth crater, Mars
- Navan crater, Mars
- Tara crater, Mars
- Wicklow crater, Mars

== See also ==
- List of Ireland-related topics
- Scottish place names in other countries
- List of non-US places that have a US place named after them
