= Belfast (disambiguation) =

Belfast is the capital and largest city of Northern Ireland, United Kingdom.

Belfast may also refer to:

== Places ==
=== South Africa ===
- Belfast, Mpumalanga, South Africa
- Belfast, Limpopo, South Africa

=== United Kingdom ===
- Belfast (Northern Ireland Parliament constituencies) (1921–1973), former constituencies of the Northern Ireland city
- Belfast (Parliament of Ireland constituency) (1603–1800), in present-day Northern Ireland
- Belfast (UK Parliament constituency) (1801–1885)
- Belfast Lough, intertidal sea inlet on the east coast of Northern Ireland

=== United States ===
- Belfast, California, in Lassen County
- Belfast, Georgia
- Belfast, Maine
- Belfast Township, Murray County, Minnesota
- Belfast, Missouri
- Belfast, Nebraska
- Belfast, New York, a town
  - Belfast (CDP), New York, a hamlet in the town
- Belfast, Clermont County, Ohio
- Belfast, Highland County, Ohio
- Belfast, Pennsylvania
- Belfast Township, Fulton County, Pennsylvania
- Belfast, Tennessee

=== Elsewhere ===
- Belfast, New Zealand
- Belfast, Prince Edward Island, Canada
- Port Fairy, Victoria, Australia, formerly known as Belfast

== Arts, entertainment, and media ==
=== Music ===
- Belfast (album), a 2004 album by the Spanish folk metal group Mägo de Oz
- "Belfast" (Elton John song), a 1995 track by Elton John on the album Made in England
- "Belfast" (Boney M. song), a 1977 single by Boney M
- "Belfast", a track on the 1986 album Animal Man by Rogue Male
- "Belfast", a track on the 2008 album Stainless Style by Neon Neon
- "Belfast", a track on the EP "III" by Orbital
- "Belfast (Penguins and Cats)", a track on the album Call Off the Search by Katie Melua

=== Other media ===
- Belfast (film), a 2021 British film.
- Belfast Telegraph, a daily newspaper published in Belfast, Northern Ireland

== Military ==
- Belfast Blitz, German air raids on Belfast in 1941 during World War II
- Belfast Commando, a former light infantry regiment of the South African Army
- HMS Belfast, a Town-class cruiser of the Royal Navy launched in 1938, now a museum ship in London
- USS Belfast, a Tacoma-class frigate in commission from 1943 to 1945 and then transferred to the Soviet Union
- HMS Belfast (F90) , a Type 26 frigate of the Royal Navy
- Short Belfast, a heavy-lift turboprop freighter aircraft

== Other uses ==
- Belfast Giants, ice hockey team from Belfast, Northern Ireland
