= Kilkenny (disambiguation) =

Kilkenny is a city, the county seat of County Kilkenny, Ireland.

Kilkenny may also refer to:

== Places ==
=== United States ===
- Kilkenny, Minnesota, a city
- Kilkenny Township, Le Sueur County, Minnesota, a township
- Kilkenny, New Hampshire, a township
- Kilkenny (Richmond Hill, Georgia), an estate on the National Register of Historic Places

=== Ireland ===
- County Kilkenny, a county
- Kilkenny Castle, a castle

=== Other countries ===
- Kilkenny, South Australia, Australia
- Kilkenny, Edmonton, Canada
- Kilkenny, Gloucestershire, a location in England

== Transportation ==
- Kilkenny railway station, Adelaide, Australia
- Kilkenny Airport, Ireland
- Kilkenny railway station, Ireland

== Other uses ==
- Kilkenny (surname)
- Earl of Kilkenny, former title of Viscount Mountgarret
- Kilkenny (Dáil constituency)
- Kilkenny College, Ireland
- Kilkenny GAA, Irish county hurling and football teams
- Kilkenny (novel), by Louis L'Amour, set in southeastern Utah
- Kilkenny (beer), a brand of beer produced by Guinness
- Kilkenny (horse), an eventing horse ridden by James C. Wofford in the 1968 and 1972 Olympic Games

== See also ==
- Kilkenny cats, a fabled pair of fighting cats
- Kilkenny City (disambiguation)
