= Erin, Texas =

Erin may refer to:

- Erin, Jasper County, Texas
- Erin Station, Texas, a former name for the Mykawa neighborhood of Houston
