= Rasta (artist) =

Zimbabwean-born artist (born c.1982)

- Born: Lebani Thaka David Sirenje; 1982 (age 43–44); Killarney, Bulawayo, Zimbabwe
- Other name: Rasta the Artist
- Occupation: Visual artist
- Years active: 1998–present
- Known for: Portraits of South African public figures
- Children: Angel Buhlebenkosi Sirenje (2003 -); Angelic Luthando Sirenje (2013 -)

Lebani Thaka David Sirenje (popularly known as Rasta or Rasta the Artist; born c.1982), is a Zimbabwean-born South African visual artist known for his inaccurate and often controversial portrait paintings of celebrities. He is widely recognized for his unique style and viral artworks, which frequently spark debate on social media platforms.

He has painted prominent figures such as Desmond Tutu, Tshepo Motsepe, Patrice Motsepe, Kaizer Motaung, George Bizos, Genius Kadungure, and media personalities like Leanne Manas and Zodwa Wabantu. His portrait of Manas for her 46th birthday went viral, with Manas humorously asking, “Who is the lady in the picture?” In 2019, he had social media users in stitches when his painting of Cyril Ramaphosa failed to resemble him.

== Background and career ==
Rasta was born in Killarney, Zimbabwe and raised in Pumula township in Bulawayo. His father was Mozambican.

His grandmother, Maisa Mhlanga, played a key role in nurturing his artistic talent from a young age, encouraging him to draw animals and flowers which she later used in handcrafted items for sale. Although his primary school, Ingwegwe Primary School, did not offer formal art education, he practiced sketching during spare time and sold his drawings to classmates and teachers. He later attended Magwegwe Secondary School, where he continued to develop his skills.

Rasta has become a fixture at public memorials and national events, often appearing with portraits of the deceased or honored figures. His paintings, while controversial and frequently criticized for perceived inaccuracies, have also won him admiration and a substantial following on social media. As of 2021, he had over 32,000 Twitter followers and described himself as “the best-rated paint artist in SA.

Rasta's father hailed from Mozambique, while his mother Plumtree Zimnyana, is Zimbabwean. He has two daughters, Angel and Angelic, who are also artistically inclined. Rasta believes art is his calling and that he was “born to do art.” He continues to paint publicly and often creates portraits at funerals, church events and political gatherings.

In June 2022, Rasta one of hosted one of his largest solo exhibitions at Museum Africa in Newtown, Johannesburg. The exhibition showcased approximately 600 of his paintings, including portraits of prominent figures such as Winnie Madikizela-Mandela, Julius Malema, Queen Elizabeth II, Riky Rick, and Nelson Mandela.

Rasta also unveiled a life-sized clay sculpture of himself created by Durban-based artist Dr Lungelo Gumede. Speaking at the event, Rasta described his art as “historic” and emphasized that many of his pieces were painted on-site at important national events.

The exhibition attracted large crowds, including schoolchildren, and was praised for its role in expanding public engagement with the arts. Through this exhibition, Rasta hoped to raise funds to establish an art academy aimed at teaching painting to youth as a constructive alternative to crime and substance abuse.
