= Waterfalls, Harare =

Suburb of Harare, Zimbabwe

Coordinates: 17°54′36″S 31°00′55″E

Waterfalls is a residential suburb in the southern region of Harare, Zimbabwe and falls under Harare Ward 23 District. Waterfalls neighbourhoods include Ardbennie, Cheviot, Derbyshire, Grobbie Park, Houghton Park, Induna Park, Mainway Meadows, Malvern, Midlands, Parktown, Prospect, Shortstone and Uplands. The name Waterfalls is a reference to the falls that lead into Mukuvisi River. There are squatted informal settlements around Waterfalls. As of 2013, the biggest squatter zone in Harare was Hopley, next to Waterfalls.
