= Coon Creek (Spring River tributary) =

Stream in the U.S. state of Missouri

Coon Creek is a stream in Jasper and Barton counties of southwest Missouri. It is a tributary of the North Fork Spring River.

The stream headwaters are in northeast Jasper County at 37°17′04″N 94°04′45″W and the confluence with the North Fork Spring River is at 37°21′29″N 94°18′41″W. The stream source is located southwest of Dudenville and it flows to the northwest and then west crossing the Jasper–Barton county line several times before flowing into the North Fork Spring River in southern Barton County after passing under U. S. Route 71 about one mile north of Jasper.

Coon Creek was named after the raccoon native to the area.

== See also ==
- List of rivers of Missouri
