= Dublin, Missouri =

Former community in Missouri, U.S.

Coordinates: 37.355581°N 94.301326°W

Dublin is a former community in Barton County, Missouri, United States, located on the Jasper County line, approximately one mile north of the current town of Jasper. It was named after Dublin, Ireland.

Dublin and what is now Jasper were often referred to as Midway, but that moniker more properly referred to the Jasper County settlement. The main road through Dublin, later made part of the Jefferson Highway, continues south to become Main Street in Jasper.

Jasper overtook Dublin in growth with the coming of the Missouri Pacific Railroad: though both were on the route, Jasper got the depot after the company could not come to an agreement with E.C. Morlan, the main shopkeeper and landowner in Dublin.

The Dublin community slowly withered away after 1900, and in the 1960s the townsite was bisected by a realignment of U.S. Route 71, which included construction of a larger, modern viaduct across the railroad and Coon Creek.

Today all that remains to mark the existence of the community is a single residence, a large MFA Oil propane storage tank, a few dead-end driveways to former residences, and foundation remnants along Coon Creek marking the former location of the local grist mill.

A jog existed at the county line on the main road through the town for more than 100 years. This was straightened in 2001 to allow for the replacement of the low-water crossing of Coon Creek with an all-weather bridge.
