= Mount Galwey =

Mountain in Waterton Lakes NP, Alberta, Canada

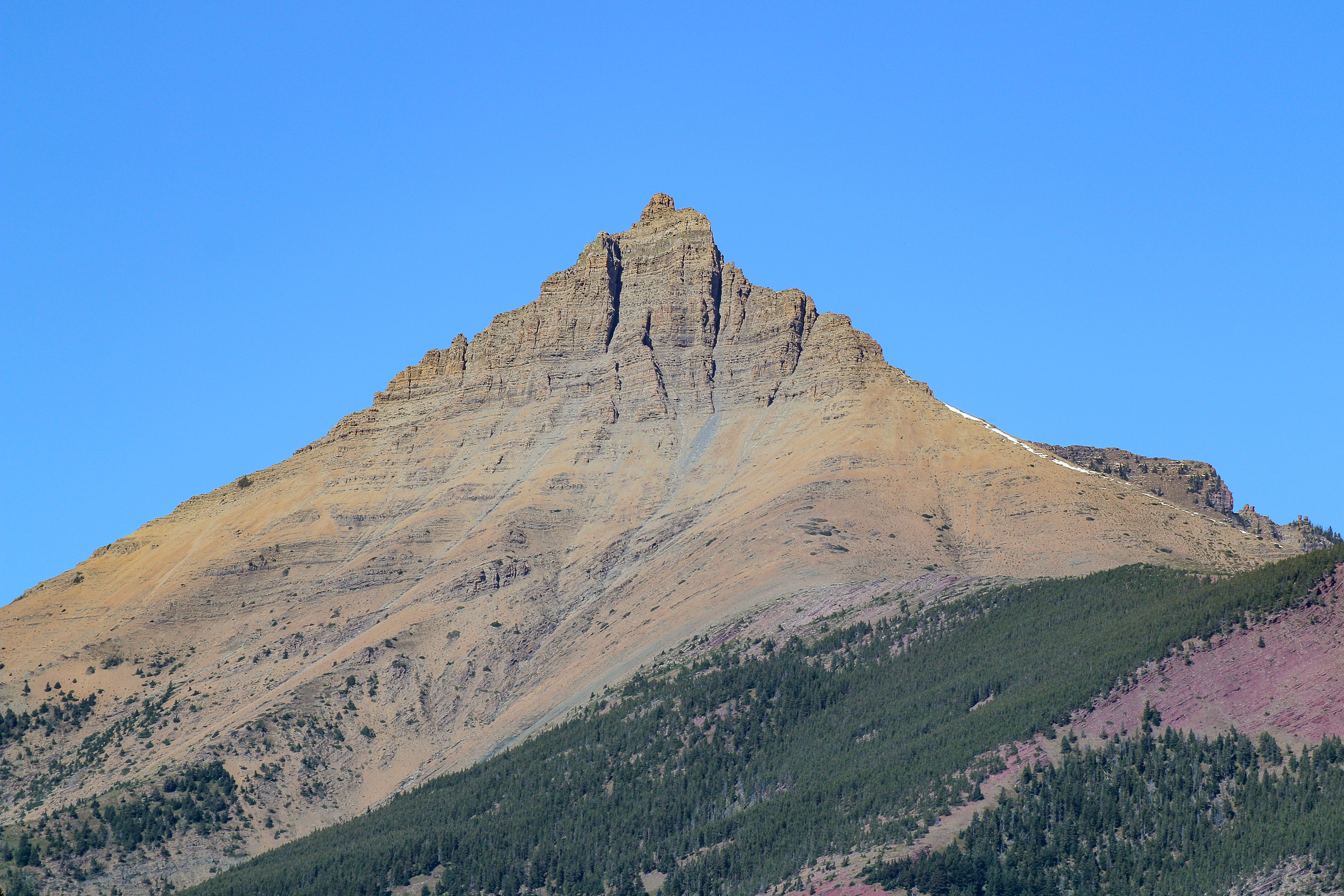

Highest point
- Elevation: 2,377 m (7,799 ft)
- Prominence: 182 m (597 ft)
- Parent peak: Mount Dungarvan (2575 m)
- Listing: Mountains of Alberta
- Coordinates: 49°07′23″N 113°56′47″W

Geography
- Location within Alberta Location within Canada
- Location: Alberta, Canada
- Parent range: Canadian Rockies
- Topo map: NTS 82H4 Waterton Lakes

Climbing
- Easiest route: Difficult Scramble

Mount Galwey is a mountain located north of Blakiston Creek in Waterton Lakes National Park, Alberta, Canada. The mountain was named in 1934 after Lt. Galwey, who was an astronomer for the International Boundary Commission.

== Geology ==
Like other mountains in Waterton Lakes National Park, Mount Galwey is composed of sedimentary rock laid down during the Precambrian to Jurassic periods. Formed in shallow seas, this sedimentary rock was pushed east and over the top of younger Cretaceous period rock during the Laramide orogeny.

== Climate ==
Based on the Köppen climate classification, Mount Galwey is located in a subarctic climate zone with cold, snowy winters, and mild summers. Temperatures can drop below −20 °C with wind chill factors below −30 °C. Precipitation runoff from Mount Galwey drains into tributaries of the Waterton River.

== See also ==
- Geology of Alberta
