= Hopley, Harare =

Hopley Hopley Farm
- Country: Zimbabwe
- Province: Harare Province
- Established: 2005

Population (2018)
  - Total: 60,000

Hopley, also known as Hopley Farm, is a suburb of Harare, Zimbabwe.

== History ==
Hopley was created in 2005 following Operation Murambatsvina. At the time, Hopley was used as temporary accommodation for those displaced; Human rights workers and journalists were unable to gain access. The following year, Amnesty International and Zimbabwe Lawyers for Human Rights reported that there was no infrastructure and inhabitants lacked basic amenities.

People live either on land supplied by the government or council, or on a squatted informal settlement. As of 2015, the suburb had an estimated population of nearly 35,000 and in 2018, it was 60,000. In 2021, water shortages forced residents to drink from a well in a graveyard.

== See also ==
- Epworth
