= Squatting in Zimbabwe =

Zimbabwe on globe

Squatting in Zimbabwe is the settlement of land or buildings without the permission of the owner. Squatting began under colonialism. After Zimbabwe was created in 1980, peasant farmers and squatters disputed the distribution of land. Informal settlements have developed on the periphery of cities such as Chitungwiza and the capital Harare. In 2005, Operation Murambatsvina (Operation Drive out filth) evicted an estimated 700,000 people.

== History ==
Squatting on the territory that would later become Zimbabwe began under colonialism and was governed by laws such as the 1894 Matebeleland Order-in-Council, the 1898 Southern Rhodesia Order-in-Council, the 1930 Land Apportionment Act, and the 1969 Land Tenure Act. Starting in the late 1970s, informal settlements appeared on the periphery of Harare and were routinely demolished, except for Epworth which survived because of its size (about 50,000 people).

When the government purchased land from White farmers as part of land reforms following the creation of Zimbabwe in 1980, a conflict developed between peasant farmers (represented by the National Farmers Association of Zimbabwe) and squatters over who should get the land. Despite being under-represented politically, squatters often gained land, simply by taking it. They were aided by the inefficiency of the government. In 1983, ZANU–PF launched Operation Clean-up and demolished many informal settlements in Harare.

Sometimes squatting is used as a housing tactic by workers who have recently been made unemployed, such as miners from closed down mines or agricultural workers from farms bought up by the government. In cases such as these, the authorities are more lenient and tolerate the squatters, for example at Insiza District near Bulawayo.

By 2015, a housing crisis had developed and informal settlements were booming on the periphery of Harare in districts such as Amsterdam, Borrowdale, Hopley Farm, Mabvuku and Waterfalls, as well as nearby Chitungwiza.

== Operation Murambatsvina ==
Part of Mbare township before Operation Murambatsvina

The same area after Operation Murambatsvina

In 2005, the ruling ZANU–PF began Operation Murambatsvina (Operation Drive Out Filth), which was intended to reduce crime by eradicating the slums of Zimbabwe. Three children died as their homes were demolished. Human rights groups such as Amnesty International condemned the evictions, with US Secretary of State Condoleezza Rice calling on the Africa Union (AU) to take action. The AU refused to take steps concerning the actions of an elected government and South African President Thabo Mbeki questioned why the international community was bothered by the situation in Zimbabwe and not by that in the Democratic Republic of Congo where three million people had died in the civil war.

Opposition leaders in Zimbabwe suggested that the evictions were aimed at punishing slum dwellers for not voting for ZANU-PF. After three weeks of evictions, President Robert Mugabe responded that the operation was a "a vigorous clean-up campaign to restore sanity" in which around 30,000 people had been arrested. The United Nations envoy Anna Tibaijuka estimated that 700,000 people had been evicted and over two million people had been affected. Mugabe's administration blocked aid efforts. John Vidal wrote in The Guardian "the vilification of Mugabe is now out of control". In Bulawayo, squatters returned to their demolished shacks and started rebuilding them.
