= Dublin, Kentucky =

Unincorporated community in Kentucky, United States

- Unincorporated community
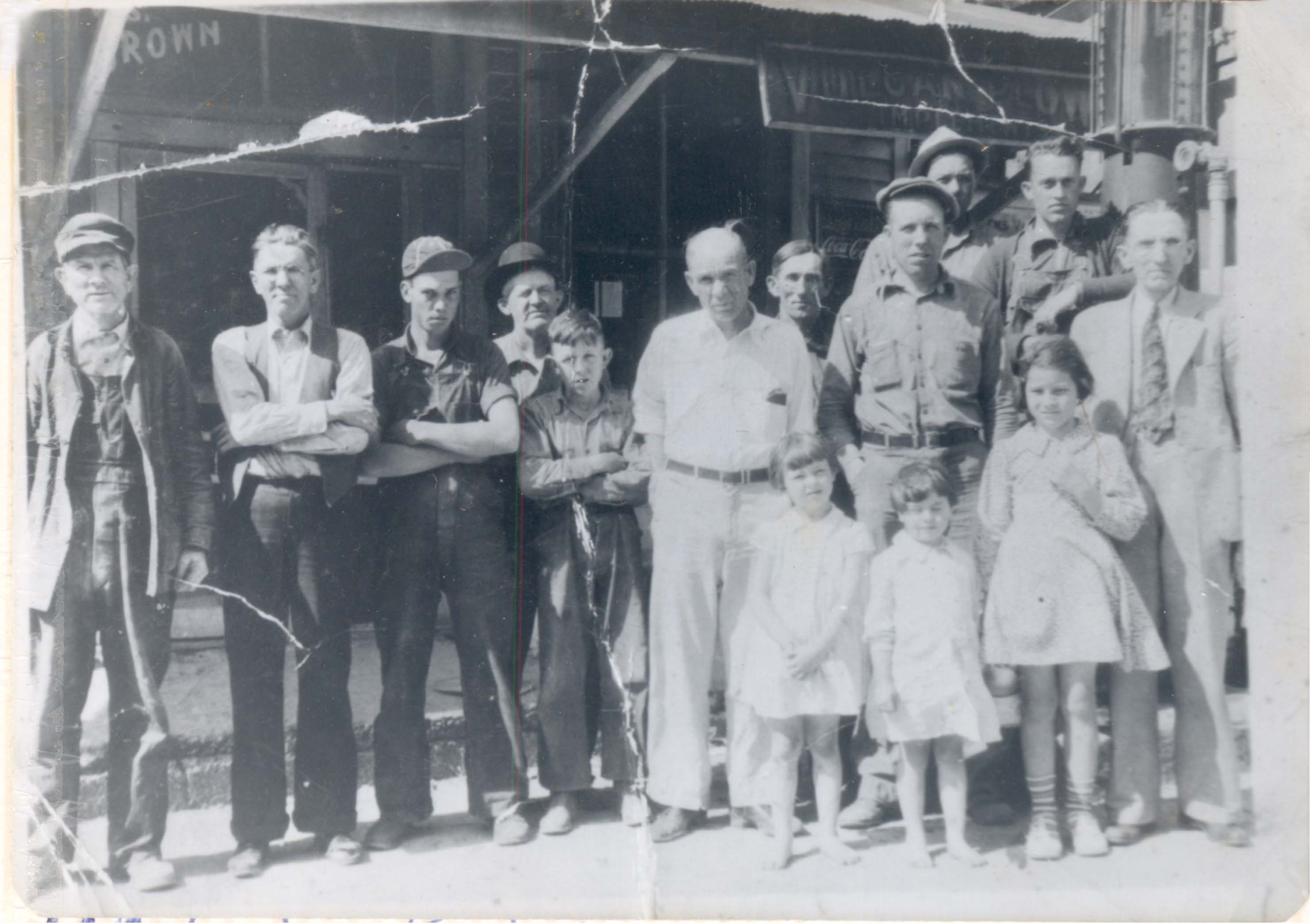
- Dublin, KY in the early 1900s

- Location within Kentucky Location within the United States
- Coordinates: 36°43′31″N 88°48′08″W
- Country: United States
- State: Kentucky
- County: Graves
- Elevation: 499 ft (152 m)
- Time zone: UTC-6 (Central (CST))
  - Summer (DST): UTC-5 (CDT)
- GNIS feature ID: 491246

Dublin is an unincorporated community in Graves County, Kentucky, United States. It was named after the city of Dublin, Ireland.
