= Jasper, Missouri =

- City
- Location of Jasper, Missouri
- Coordinates: 37°20′07″N 94°18′08″W
- Country: United States
- State: Missouri
- County: Jasper

Area
  - Total: 1.13 sq mi (2.92 km^{2})
  - Land: 1.11 sq mi (2.87 km^{2})
  - Water: 0.019 sq mi (0.05 km^{2})
- Elevation: 945 ft (288 m)

Population (2020)
  - Total: 906
  - Density: 817.6/sq mi (315.68/km^{2})
- Time zone: UTC-6 (Central (CST))
  - Summer (DST): UTC-5 (CDT)
- ZIP code: 64755
- Area code: 417
- FIPS code: 29-36512
- GNIS feature ID: 2395460

Jasper is a city in Jasper County, Missouri, United States. As of the 2020 census, Jasper had a population of 906. It is part of the Joplin, Missouri Metropolitan Statistical Area.

== Geography ==
Jasper is located one mile south of the Barton-Jasper county line. It is on I-49/U.S. Route 71 approximately ten miles south of Lamar and ten miles north of Carthage.

According to the United States Census Bureau, the city has a total area of 1.13 square miles (2.93 km^{2}), of which 1.11 square miles (2.87 km^{2}) is land and 0.02 square miles (0.05 km^{2}) is water.

== Demographics ==
Historical population
Census	Pop.	Note	%±
1880	54		—
1890	400		640.7%
1900	627		56.8%
1910	664		5.9%
1920	766		15.4%
1930	754		−1.6%
1940	804		6.6%
1950	776		−3.5%
1960	746		−3.9%
1970	796		6.7%
1980	1,012		27.1%
1990	994		−1.8%
2000	1,012		1.8%
2010	931		−8.0%
2020	906		−2.7%
U.S. Decennial Census

=== 2010 census ===
As of the census of 2010, there were 931 people, 365 households, and 247 families living in the city. The population density was 838.7 inhabitants per square mile (323.8/km^{2}). There were 447 housing units at an average density of 402.7 per square mile (155.5/km^{2}). The racial makeup of the city was 97.0% White, 0.3% African American, 0.2% Native American, 0.5% Asian, and 1.9% from two or more races. Hispanic or Latino of any race were 0.5% of the population.

There were 365 households, of which 34.2% had children under the age of 18 living with them, 49.9% were married couples living together, 12.6% had a female householder with no husband present, 5.2% had a male householder with no wife present, and 32.3% were non-families. 26.8% of all households were made up of individuals, and 13.2% had someone living alone who was 65 years of age or older. The average household size was 2.55 and the average family size was 3.05.

The median age in the city was 36.7 years. 25.8% of residents were under the age of 18; 9.3% were between the ages of 18 and 24; 25% were from 25 to 44; 26.5% were from 45 to 64; and 13.4% were 65 years of age or older. The gender makeup of the city was 50.1% male and 49.9% female.

=== 2000 census ===
As of the census of 2000, there were 1,011 people, 409 households, and 271 families living in the city. The population density was 921.8 inhabitants per square mile (355.9/km^{2}). There were 454 housing units at an average density of 413.9 per square mile (159.8/km^{2}). The racial makeup of the city was 95.85% White, 0.30% African American, 0.89% Native American, 0.20% Asian, 0.40% from other races, and 2.37% from two or more races. Hispanic or Latino of any race were 2.57% of the population.

There were 409 households, out of which 31.5% had children under the age of 18 living with them, 51.8% were married couples living together, 11.5% had a female householder with no husband present, and 33.7% were non-families. 30.6% of all households were made up of individuals, and 16.4% had someone living alone who was 65 years of age or older. The average household size was 2.45 and the average family size was 3.01.

In the city the population was spread out, with 28.3% under the age of 18, 9.2% from 18 to 24, 23.4% from 25 to 44, 22.0% from 45 to 64, and 17.1% who were 65 years of age or older. The median age was 38 years. For every 100 females, there were 86.9 males. For every 100 females age 18 and over, there were 84.9 males.

The median income for a household in the city was $27,650, and the median income for a family was $31,667. Males had a median income of $26,304 versus $19,219 for females. The per capita income for the city was $17,067. About 10.6% of families and 12.4% of the population were below the poverty line, including 17.2% of those under age 18 and 9.5% of those age 65 or over.

== History ==
Jasper has been known as Coon Creek settlement, and as Midway (a name that at times included the Dublin community just across the Barton County line) for its position between county seats Carthage and Lamar, but in the late 19th century it was renamed Jasper to reuse the postal equipment of a previous Jasper that existed southeast of Carthage.

Jasper was the home to Debra Dene Barnes Miles the year after she finished her reign as Miss America (from 'Miss Kansas' title) in 1968.

== Education ==
It is in the Jasper County R-V School District.

== Jasper in media ==
Jasper is the nominal setting of the 1989 movie Road House, starring Patrick Swayze; however, the movie was not actually filmed in Jasper. Critic Robert Trussell noted, "Little effort was made to hide the (California) mountains in the background."
