= Ireland, West Virginia =

- Unincorporated community
- Flag

- Location within the state of West Virginia Ireland (the United States)
- Coordinates: 38°48′56″N 80°27′42″W
- Country: United States
- State: West Virginia
- County: Lewis
- Time zone: UTC-5 (Eastern (EST))
  - Summer (DST): UTC-4 (EDT)
- ZIP code: 26376
- Area codes: 304 and 681

Ireland is an unincorporated community in Lewis County, West Virginia, United States. The community was named after Ireland, the ancestral home of the first settler.

Ireland is also the American home of the sport of Irish Road Bowling.

== Climate ==
The climate in this area has mild differences between highs and lows, and there is adequate rainfall year-round. According to the Köppen Climate Classification system, Ireland has a marine west coast climate, abbreviated "Cfb" on climate maps.
