= Dublin Township, Swift County, Minnesota =

Dublin Township, Minnesota
- Township
- Location within the state of Minnesota Dublin Township, Minnesota (the United States)
- Coordinates: 45°12′11″N 95°26′27″W
- Country: United States
- State: Minnesota
- County: Swift

Area
  - Total: 34.9 sq mi (90.5 km^{2})
  - Land: 34.9 sq mi (90.5 km^{2})
  - Water: 0 sq mi (0.0 km^{2})
- Elevation: 1,060 ft (323 m)

Population (2000)
  - Total: 156
  - Density: 4.4/sq mi (1.7/km^{2})
- Time zone: UTC-6 (Central (CST))
  - Summer (DST): UTC-5 (CDT)
- FIPS code: 27-16444
- GNIS feature ID: 0664003

Dublin Township is a township in Swift County, Minnesota, United States. The population was 156 at the 2000 census.

Dublin Township was organized in 1878, and named after Dublin, Ireland, the native land of a large share of its early settlers.

== Geography ==
According to the United States Census Bureau, the township has a total area of 34.9 square miles (90 km^{2}), all land.

== Demographics ==
As of the census of 2000, there were 156 people, 58 households, and 48 families residing in the township. The population density was 4.5 inhabitants per square mile (1.7/km^{2}). There were 60 housing units at an average density of 1.7 per square mile (0.66/km^{2}). The racial makeup of the township was 95.51% White, 0.64% African American, and 3.85% from two or more races.

There were 58 households, out of which 34.5% had children under the age of 18 living with them, 77.6% were married couples living together, and 17.2% were non-families. 17.2% of all households were made up of individuals, and 5.2% had someone living alone who was 65 years of age or older. The average household size was 2.69 and the average family size was 2.98.

In the township the population was spread out, with 29.5% under the age of 18, 3.2% from 18 to 24, 23.1% from 25 to 44, 28.2% from 45 to 64, and 16.0% who were 65 years of age or older. The median age was 41 years. For every 100 females, there were 136.4 males. For every 100 females age 18 and over, there were 120.0 males.

The median income for a household in the township was $45,000, and the median income for a family was $46,250. Males had a median income of $31,607 versus $28,750 for females. The per capita income for the township was $16,553. About 6.0% of families and 3.3% of the population were below the poverty line, including none of those under the age of eighteen or sixty five or over.
