= Londonderry, Guernsey County, Ohio =

Unincorporated community in Ohio, U.S.

Coordinates: 40°09′17″N 81°18′01″W

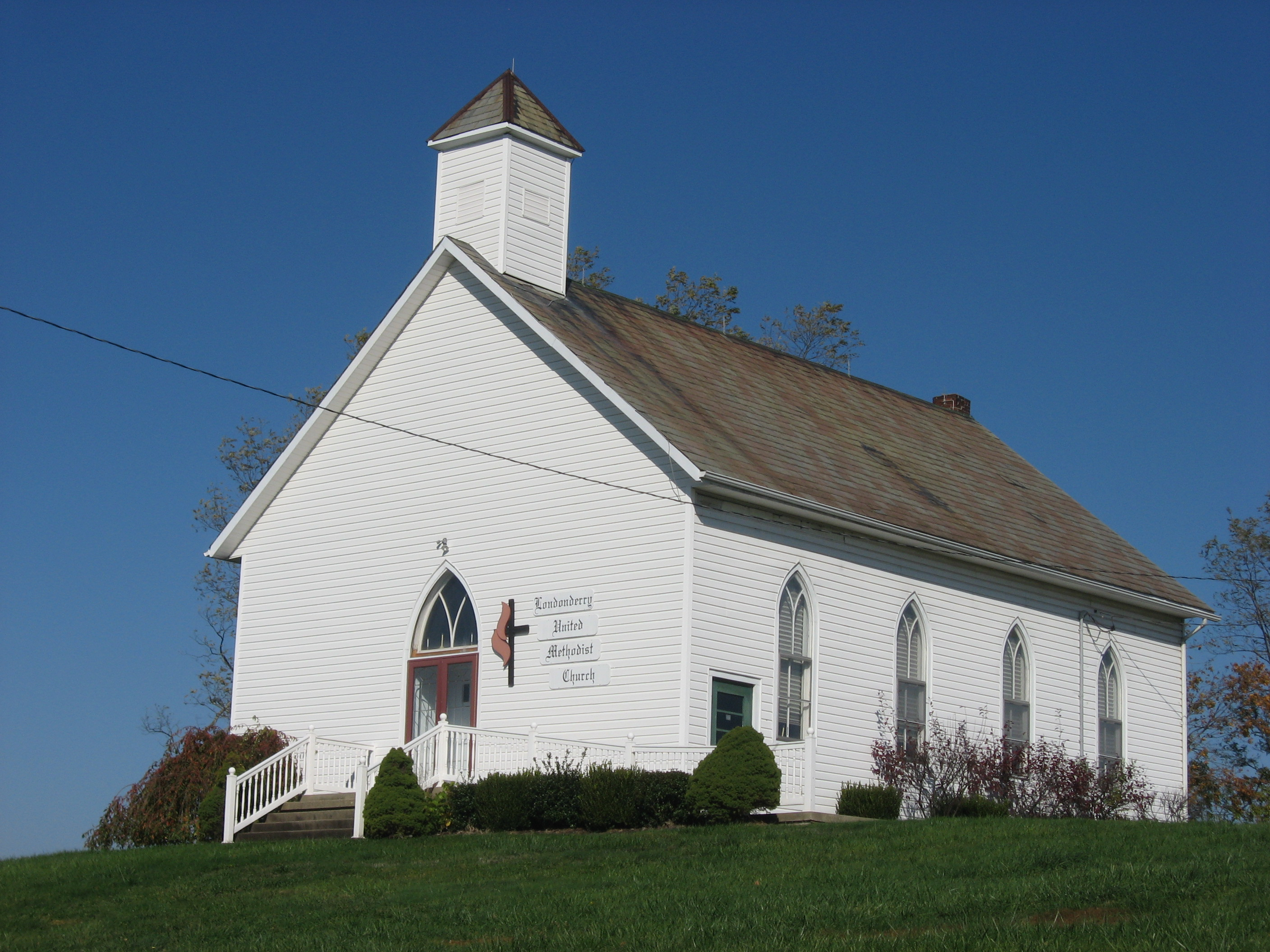
Methodist church

Londonderry is an unincorporated community in Londonderry Township, Guernsey County, Ohio, United States.

== History ==
Londonderry was platted in 1815. The community takes its name from Londonderry, in Northern Ireland. A post office was established at Londonderry in 1819, and remained in operation until 1907.
