= Killarney, Victoria =

Coordinates: 38.344°S 142.313°E

Killarney
- Town
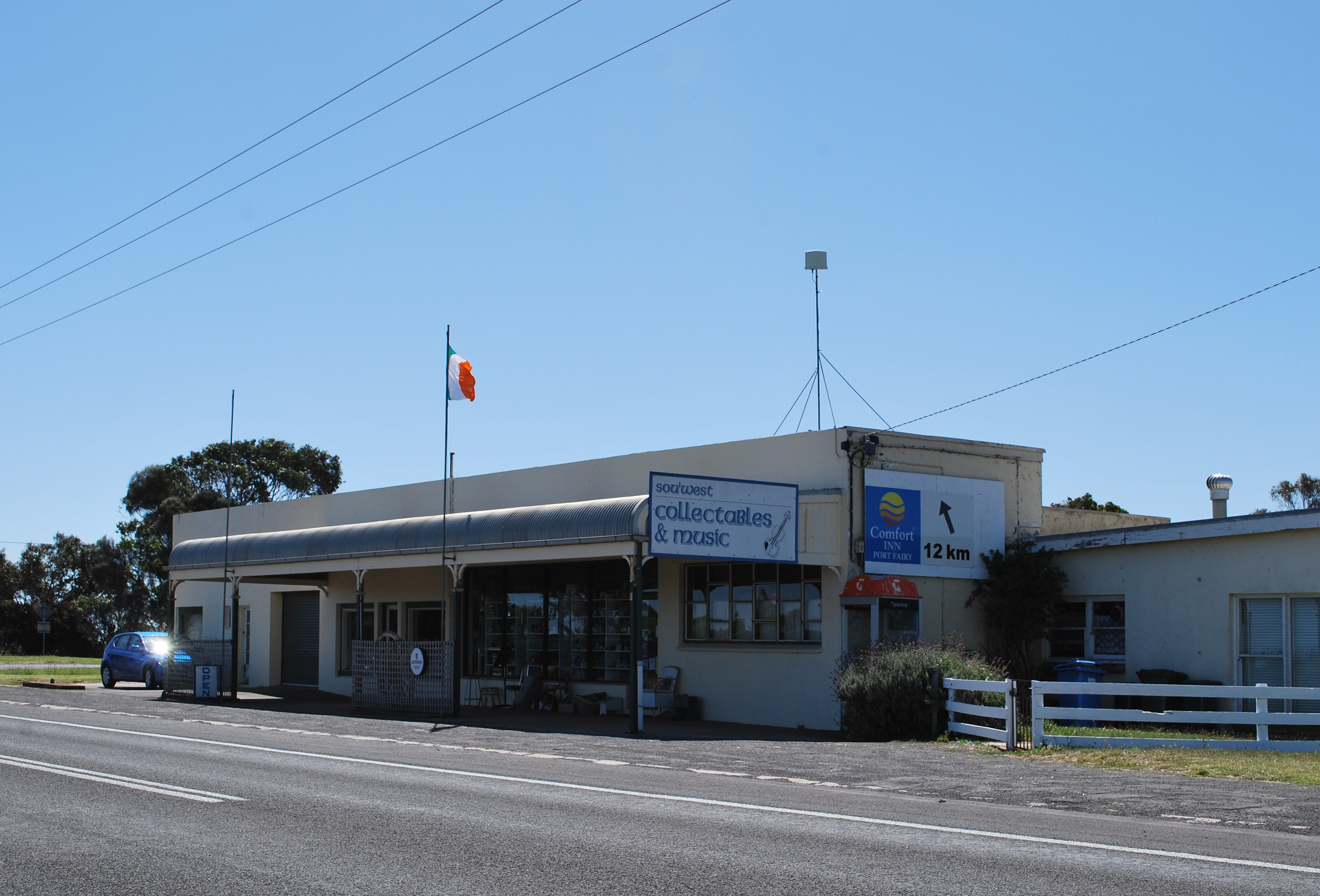
- A Shop in town on the Princes Highway
- Country: Australia
- State: Victoria
- LGA: Shire Of Moyne
- Location: 282 km (175 mi) W of Melbourne; 18 km (11 mi) W of Warrnambool; 9 km (5.6 mi) NE of Port Fairy
- Established: 1800s

Government
  - State electorate: South West Coast
  - Federal division: Wannon

Population
  - Total: 793 (2006 census)
- Postcode: 3283

Killarney is a town in south-western Victoria, located 282 kilometres (175 mi) south-west of Melbourne on the Princes Highway. At the time of the 2006 census the population of the district was 793.

Killarney was most likely named in the 19th century after Killarney in Ireland by Irish settlers. The main produce of the district is dairy farming, but sheep farming, cattle farming and grain farming do take place as well. Killarney has a beach which is accessible via Mahoneys Road. The town has a cricket team competing in the Grassmere Cricket Association.
