= Killarney, Zimbabwe =

Suburb of Bulawayo including informal settlement

Coordinates: 20°08′S 28°39′E

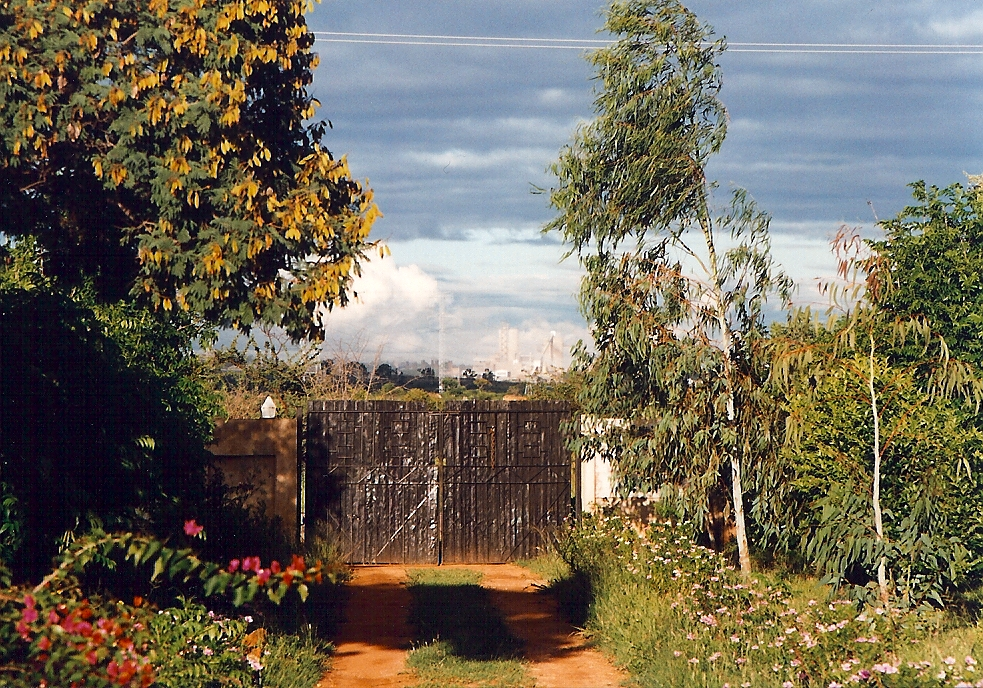
Garden in Killarney with cement works just visible over gate

Killarney is a suburb of Bulawayo, Zimbabwe. It includes a squatted informal settlement also called Killarney.

== Informal settlement ==
The Killarney squatted informal settlement had 700 inhabitants in 1981 and 2,000 the following year. At its peak it had 4,000. It is composed of three camps: Xotsha, Tshaka and Two Stamp.

During Operation Murambatsvina (Operation Drive Out Filth) in 2005, police wielding iron bars evicted the camps and razed them to the ground. The squatters who had been forcibly evicted from their homes then returned to their shacks and started rebuilding them.

In 2021, squatters said that they had lost their means of income due to the COVID-19 pandemic in Zimbabwe. They also complained that they only had running water from one tap and sometimes it ran green.
