= Limerick, Ohio =

- Unincorporated community
- Location within Ohio
- Coordinates: 39°07′29″N 82°44′58″W
- Country: United States
- State: Ohio
- Counties: Jackson
- Elevation: 630 ft (192 m)
- Time zone: UTC-5 (Eastern (EST))
  - Summer (DST): UTC-4 (EDT)
- ZIP code: 45601
- Area code: 740
- GNIS feature ID: 1064998

Limerick is an unincorporated community in Jackson Township, Jackson County, Ohio, United States.
