= Ireland, Nova Scotia =

Locality in Nova Scotia, Canada

Coordinates: 45°27′14.15″N 62°4′47.56″W

Ireland in Nova Scotia

Ireland (Éirinn in Gaelic) is a locality in the Canadian province of Nova Scotia, located in Antigonish County.
