= Tyrone, Morrow County, Ohio =

Coordinates: 40°25′38″N 82°59′19″W

Tyrone is a ghost town in Westfield Township, Morrow County, in the U.S. state of Ohio.

== History ==
Tyrone was laid out in 1829.
