= Sligo, Colorado =

Ghost town

Coordinates: 40°47′55″N 104°09′50″W

Sligo is a ghost town in Weld County, in the U.S. state of Colorado.

== Namesake ==
Sligo was likely named after the town of Sligo in Ireland.

== History ==
The Chicago, Burlington, and Quincy Railroad constructed a rail line through the area in 1887, which connected Cheyenne and Sterling. A post office called Sligo was established in 1908, and the area of land which the town was located on was filed for platting on November 30 of that year. Sligo was officially platted on November 24, 1912.

Sligo's post office was shut down in 1941, indicating that the town was abandoned sometime around then. The rail line became part of the Burlington Northern Railroad in 1970, and was abandoned by 1982, with the track being entirely removed.
