= Clontarf, Minnesota =

City in Minnesota, United States

Clontarf
- City
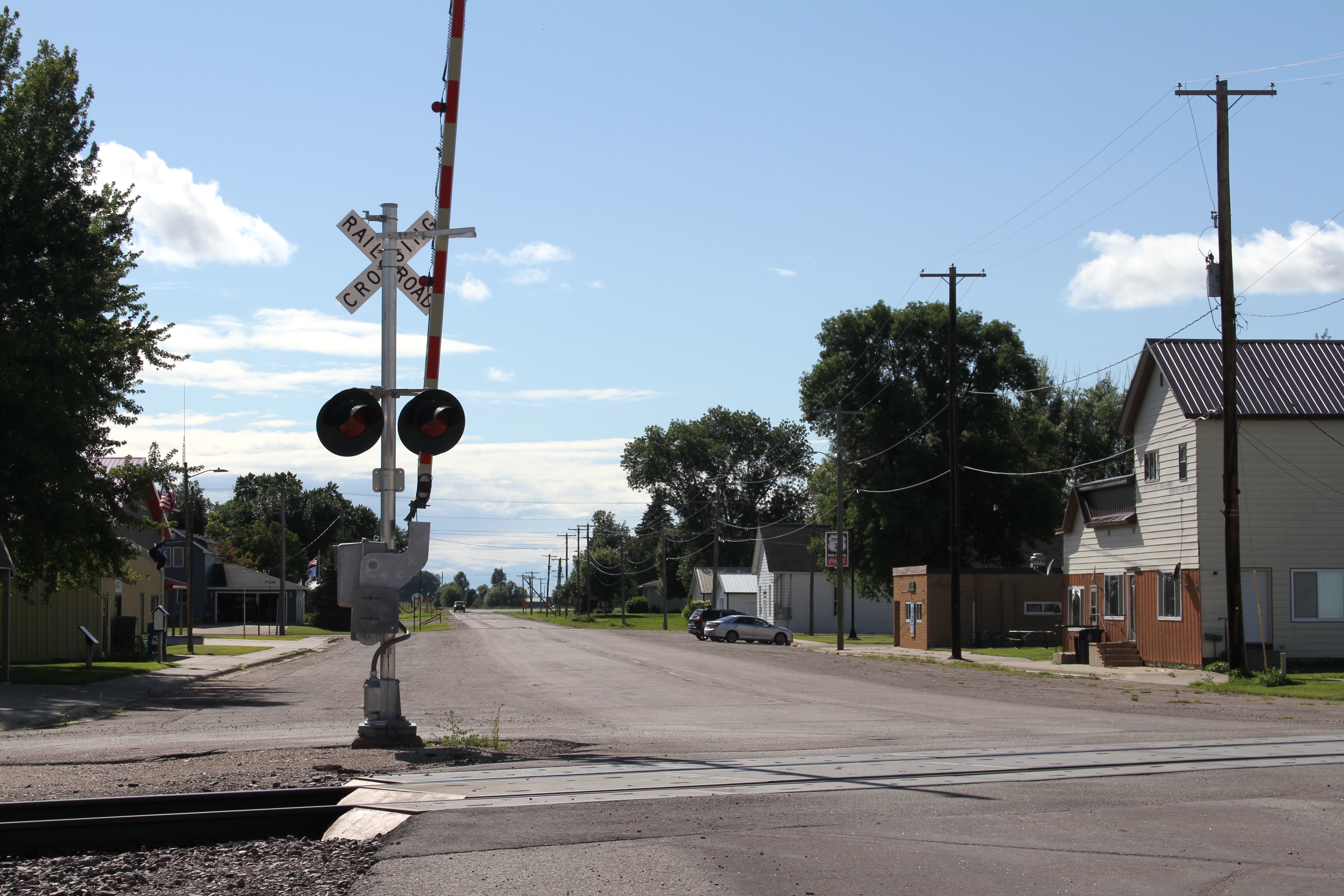
- RR Crossing at Grace Avenue

- Location of Clontarf, Minnesota
- Coordinates: 45°22′29″N 95°40′41″W
- Country: United States
- State: Minnesota
- County: Swift

Area
  - Total: 2.12 sq mi (5.50 km^{2})
  - Land: 2.08 sq mi (5.39 km^{2})
  - Water: 0.046 sq mi (0.12 km^{2})
- Elevation: 1,047 ft (319 m)

Population (2020)
  - Total: 128
  - Density: 61.5/sq mi (23.76/km^{2})
- Time zone: UTC-6 (Central (CST))
  - Summer (DST): UTC-5 (CDT)
- ZIP code: 56226
- Area code: 320
- FIPS code: 27-12124
- GNIS feature ID: 2393574

Clontarf is a city in Swift County, Minnesota, United States. The population was 128 at the 2020 census.

== History ==
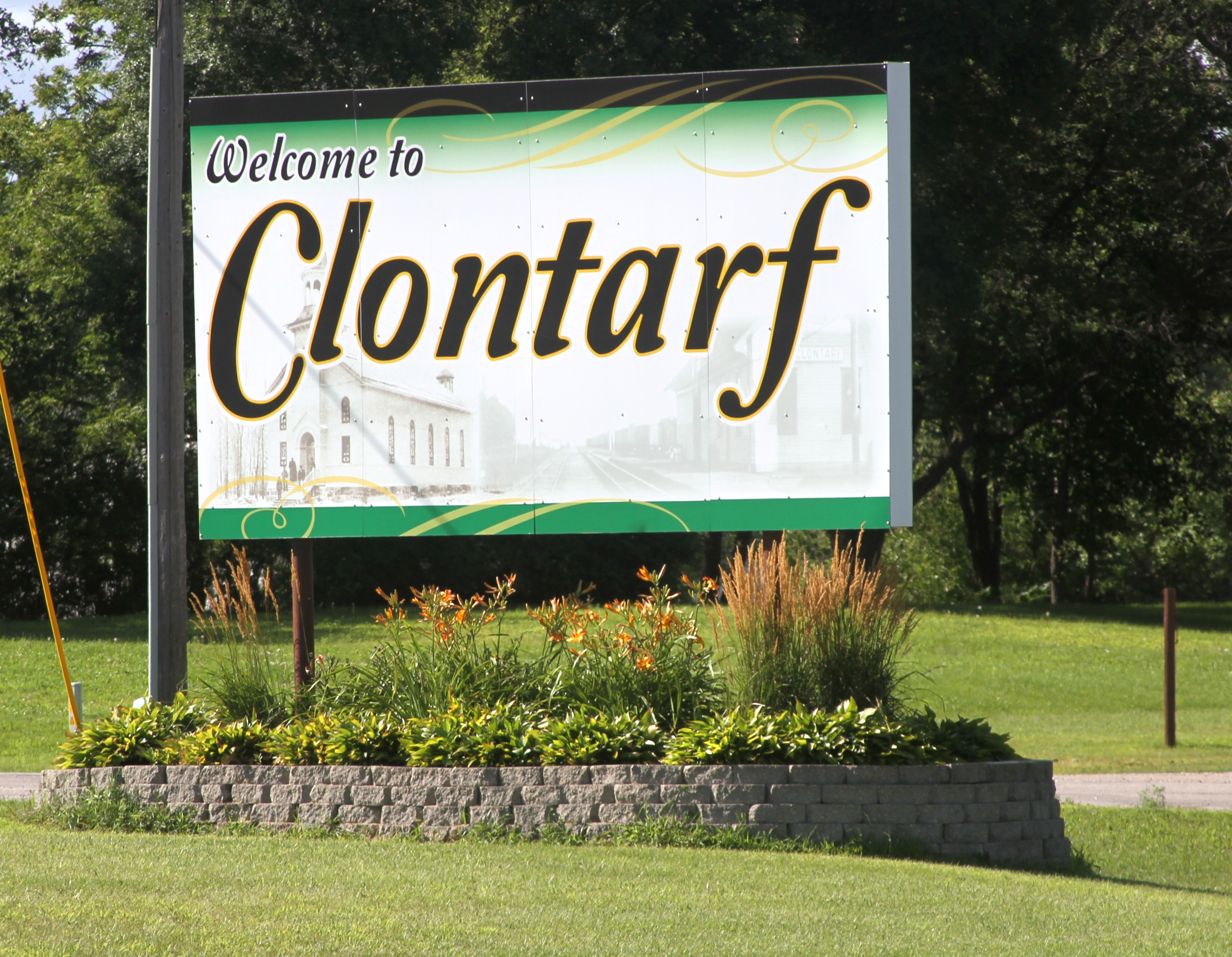
Welcome sign, Clontarf, Minnesota

Clontarf was platted in 1876, and named after Clontarf in Ireland, the native land of many of its early settlers. A post office has been in operation at Clontarf since 1876. The city was founded by Bishop John Ireland as a catholic colony, and a community for Irish-Americans. The city grew quickly and became prosperous due to the influx of Irish immigrants. In 1878, a public school opened, a grain elevator opened, and the completion of St. Malachy Church was completed. The city would deal with grasshopper plagues, grass fires, and failed crops. In response, the agriculture and economy of the area shifted towards hay production, which was more resilient to these issues. Railroad access made Clontarf a hub for hay production, being known as the 'hay capitol of the world' by the 1910s. Clontarf was incorporated as a village in 1904. The church of St. Malachy was merged with St. Francis in Benson.

St. Paul's Industrial School, sometimes called the Clontarf Industrial School, was a Native American residential school that operated in Clontarf from 1877-1898. The school was originally located outside of Saint Paul, but was moved to Clontarf in 1877 by Bishop John Ireland. The school was run by the Catholic church and held both Indigenous students and white orphans.

== Geography ==
According to the United States Census Bureau, the city has a total area of 2.01 square miles (5.21 km^{2}); 1.96 square miles (5.08 km^{2}) is land and 0.05 square miles (0.13 km^{2}) is water.

Minnesota State Highway 9 serves as a main route in the community.

== Demographics ==
Historical population
Census	Pop.	Note	%±
1910	153		—
1920	223		45.8%
1930	180		−19.3%
1940	230		27.8%
1950	206		−10.4%
1960	139		−32.5%
1970	147		5.8%
1980	196		33.3%
1990	172		−12.2%
2000	173		0.6%
2010	164		−5.2%
2020	128		−22.0%
U.S. Decennial Census

=== 2010 census ===
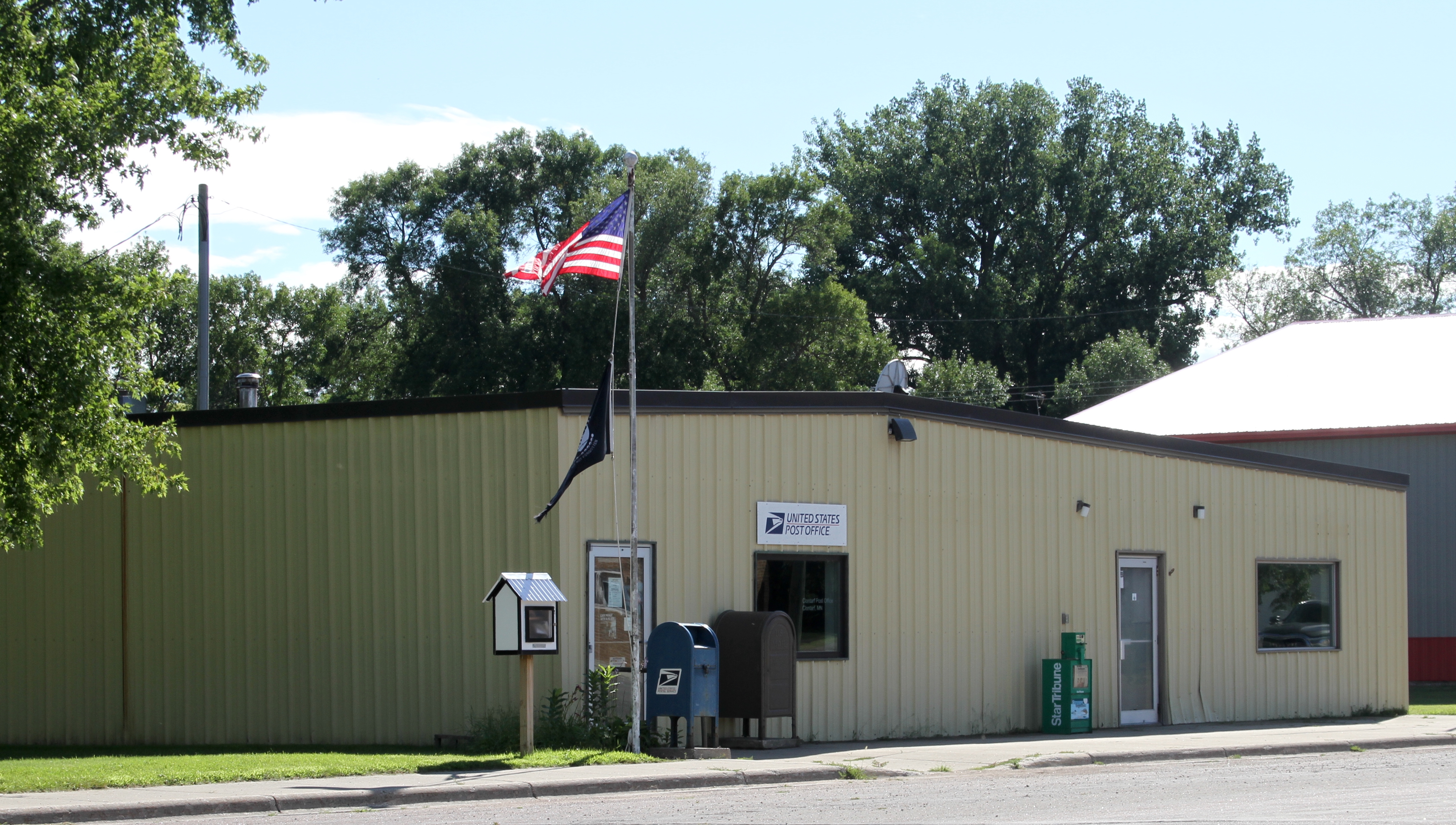
US Post Office, Clontarf, Minnesota

As of the census of 2010, there were 164 people, 64 households, and 46 families living in the city. The population density was 83.7 inhabitants per square mile (32.3/km^{2}). There were 69 housing units at an average density of 35.2 per square mile (13.6/km^{2}). The racial makeup of the city was 99.4% White and 0.6% Asian. Hispanic or Latino of any race were 2.4% of the population.

There were 64 households, of which 31.3% had children under the age of 18 living with them, 60.9% were married couples living together, 3.1% had a female householder with no husband present, 7.8% had a male householder with no wife present, and 28.1% were non-families. 20.3% of all households were made up of individuals, and 4.7% had someone living alone who was 65 years of age or older. The average household size was 2.56 and the average family size was 2.96.

The median age in the city was 42.5 years. 23.2% of residents were under the age of 18; 10.9% were between the ages of 18 and 24; 19.5% were from 25 to 44; 34.1% were from 45 to 64; and 12.2% were 65 years of age or older. The gender makeup of the city was 57.9% male and 42.1% female.

=== 2000 census ===
As of the census of 2000, there were 173 people, 62 households, and 46 families living in the city. The population density was 84.2 inhabitants per square mile (32.5/km^{2}). There were 65 housing units at an average density of 31.6 per square mile (12.2/km^{2}). The racial makeup of the city was 99.42% White and 0.58% Native American. Hispanic or Latino of any race were 3.47% of the population.

There were 62 households, out of which 41.9% had children under the age of 18 living with them, 58.1% were married couples living together, 3.2% had a female householder with no husband present, and 25.8% were non-families. 21.0% of all households were made up of individuals, and 11.3% had someone living alone who was 65 years of age or older. The average household size was 2.76 and the average family size was 3.20.

In the city, the population was spread out, with 33.5% under the age of 18, 4.6% from 18 to 24, 31.2% from 25 to 44, 19.7% from 45 to 64, and 11.0% who were 65 years of age or older. The median age was 34 years. For every 100 females, there were 113.6 males. For every 100 females age 18 and over, there were 98.3 males.

The median income for a household in the city was $55,139, and the median income for a family was $57,321. Males had a median income of $29,750 versus $30,313 for females. The per capita income for the city was $17,048. None of the families and 4.4% of the population were living below the poverty line, including no under eighteens and 15.4% of those over 64.
