= Tyrone, Coshocton County, Ohio =

Former town in Ohio, U.S.

Coordinates: 40°15′10″N 81°58′40″W

Tyrone is a former town in Coshocton County, in the U.S. state of Ohio. The GNIS classifies it as a populated place.

== History ==
A post office was established at Tyrone in 1850, and remained in operation until 1900.
