= Killarney, Georgia =

Unincorporated town in Georgia, US

Coordinates: 31°08′15″N 84°56′29″W

Killarney is a small unincorporated town in Early County, in the U.S. state of Georgia.

== History ==
A post office called Killarney was established in 1900, and remained in operation until 1905. The community was named after Killarney, in Ireland.
