= Avoca, New Zealand =

Locality in Selwyn District, Canterbury Region, New Zealand

Coordinates: 43°9′49″S 171°52′28.5″E

Avoca is a locality in the Canterbury region of New Zealand. It is situated along the Midland Railway Line between Craigieburn and Staircase. There are no permanent residents, but it once supported a small number of railway staff. It is named for Avoca, County Wicklow in Ireland.

== Mount Torlesse Coal Company ==
This company operated coal mines in the adjacent Broken River Valley between ca. 1917 and ca. 1928. It operated a 70 cm horse and steam hauled tramway from an approx. 700-metre-long inclined plane that hauled coal up out of the Broken River valley, thence 2.7 kilometres along a high hill-side to another inclined plane that lowered coal approx 600 metres to bins at Avoca railway station. Coal was then distributed throughout Canterbury. The opening of the Otira Railway Tunnel in 1923 giving access to cheaper coal from Westland probably contributed significantly to the company's demise. The old mine manager's house is now used by the Conservation Department as a field staff training facility.
