= Kilkenny City =

Kilkenny City may refer to:

- Kilkenny, a city in County Kilkenny
- Kilkenny City (Parliament of Ireland constituency)
- Kilkenny City (UK Parliament constituency)
- Kilkenny City A.F.C., an Irish football club
