= Cashel Township, Swift County, Minnesota =

Cashel Township, Minnesota
- Township
- Location within the state of Minnesota Cashel Township, Minnesota (the United States)
- Coordinates: 45°12′18″N 95°32′33″W
- Country: United States
- State: Minnesota
- County: Swift

Area
  - Total: 35.9 sq mi (93.1 km^{2})
  - Land: 35.9 sq mi (93.1 km^{2})
  - Water: 0 sq mi (0.0 km^{2})
- Elevation: 1,024 ft (312 m)

Population (2000)
  - Total: 143
  - Density: 3.9/sq mi (1.5/km^{2})
- Time zone: UTC-6 (Central (CST))
  - Summer (DST): UTC-5 (CDT)
- FIPS code: 27-10216
- GNIS feature ID: 0663761

Cashel Township is a township in Swift County, Minnesota, United States. The population was 143 at the 2000 census.

Cashel Township was organized in 1878, and named after Cashel in Ireland.

== Geography ==
According to the United States Census Bureau, the township has a total area of 35.9 square miles (93 km^{2}), all land.

== Demographics ==
As of the census of 2000, there were 143 people, 54 households, and 44 families residing in the township. The population density was 4.0 inhabitants per square mile (1.5/km^{2}). There were 61 housing units at an average density of 1.7 per square mile (0.66/km^{2}). The racial makeup of the township was 100.00% White. Hispanic or Latino of any race were 1.40% of the population.

There were 54 households, out of which 33.3% had children under the age of 18 living with them, 75.9% were married couples living together, 5.6% had a female householder with no husband present, and 16.7% were non-families. 16.7% of all households were made up of individuals, and 3.7% had someone living alone who was 65 years of age or older. The average household size was 2.65 and the average family size was 2.98.

In the township the population was spread out, with 28.0% under the age of 18, 3.5% from 18 to 24, 28.7% from 25 to 44, 18.2% from 45 to 64, and 21.7% who were 65 years of age or older. The median age was 41 years. For every 100 females, there were 134.4 males. For every 100 females age 18 and over, there were 123.9 males.

The median income for a household in the township was $46,250, and the median income for a family was $48,333. Males had a median income of $22,361 versus $21,250 for females. The per capita income for the township was $23,303. There were 11.5% of families and 11.4% of the population living below the poverty line, including 25.7% of under eighteens and none of those over 64.
