= Belfast Commando =

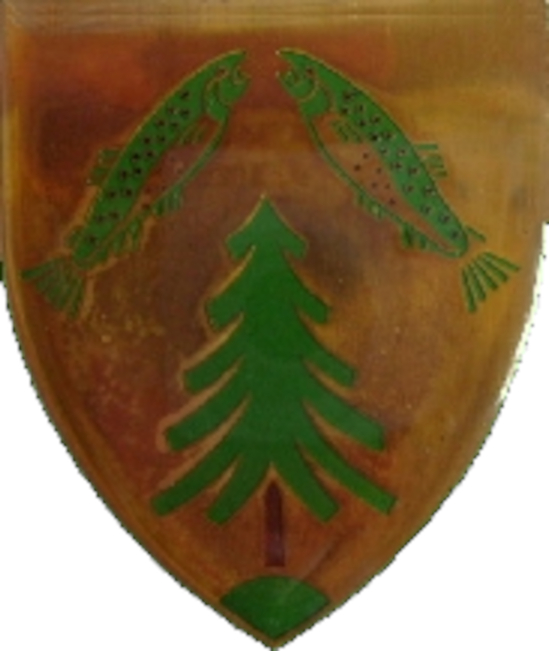
- Belfast Commando emblem
- Country: South Africa
- Allegiance: (South African Republic) Zuid Afrikaanse Republiek; Union of South Africa; Republic of South Africa; Republic of South Africa
- Branch: South African Army; South African Army
- Type: Infantry
- Role: Light Infantry
- Size: One Battalion
- Part of: South African Infantry Corps; Army Territorial Reserve, Group 28
- Garrison/HQ: Belfast, South Africa

Belfast Commando was a light infantry regiment of the South African Army. It formed part of the South African Army Infantry Formation as well as the South African Territorial Reserve.

== History ==
=== Origin ===
This commando was established on the farm Tweefontein near Belfast in the Eastern Transvaal (now Mpumalanga) in 1890. It was named after the capital city of Northern Ireland.

=== Operations ===
==== With the Zuid Afrikaanse Republiek ====
This commandos registered battle honours include:

- Sekoekoei in 1876,
- Eerste Vryheids Oorlog of 1880–81,
- Modjadji of 1890,
- Maguba of 1895,
- Mpefu of 1898,
- Anglo Boer War of 1899-1902

==== Battle Honours ====
Battle Honours
Awarded to Belfast Commando
Unknown: Sekoekoei_1876

Please see the Template:BattleHonour for help

Unknown: Eerste_Vryheids_Oorlog_1880_81

Please see the Template:BattleHonour for help

Unknown: Modjadji_1890

Please see the Template:BattleHonour for help

Unknown: Maguba_1895

Please see the Template:BattleHonour for help

Unknown: Mpefu_1898

Please see the Template:BattleHonour for help

Unknown: Anglo_Boer_War_1899_1902

Please see the Template:BattleHonour for help

==== With the UDF ====
By 1902 all Commando remnants were under British military control and disarmed.

By 1912, however previous Commando members could join shooting associations.

By 1940, such commandos were under control of the National Reserve of Volunteers.

These commandos were formally reactivated by 1948.

==== With the SADF ====
During the SADF period, this commando was responsible for area protection and fell under the command of Group 28 at Middleburg, part of Eastern Transvaal Command.

==== With the SANDF ====
===== Disbandment =====
This unit, along with all other Commando units was disbanded after a decision by South African President Thabo Mbeki to disband all Commando Units. The Commando system was phased out between 2003 and 2008 "because of the role it played in the apartheid era", according to the Minister of Safety and Security Charles Nqakula.

== Unit Insignia ==
This units first emblem was the crowned crane. The shoulder flash displayed was authorised in 1980.

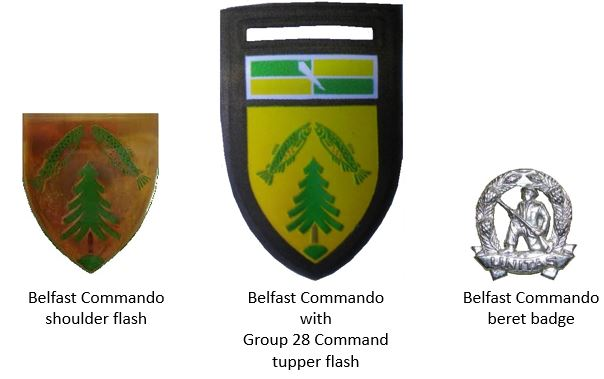
SADF era Belfast Commando insignia

== Leadership ==
Leadership
From	Honorary Colonels	To	Ribbon
	No known incumbents		
From	Commanding Officer	To	Ribbon
	No known incumbents		
From	Regimental Sergeant Major	To	Ribbon
	No known incumbents		

== See also ==
- South African Commando System
