= Tyrone, Ontario =

Tyrone
- Unincorporated community
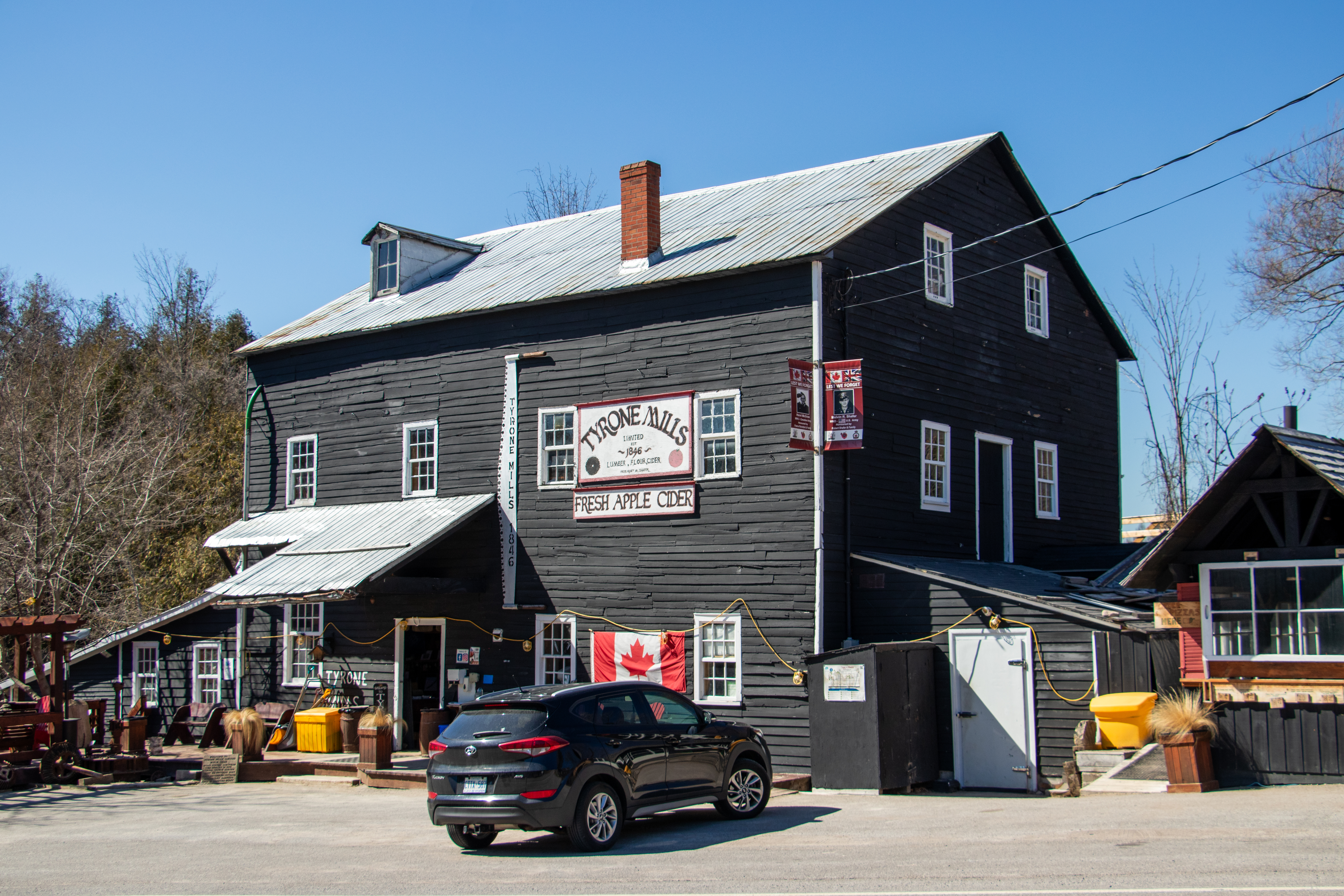
- Tyrone Mills
- Interactive map of Tyrone
- Coordinates: 44°0′35″N 78°42′49″W
- Country: Canada
- Province: Ontario
- Regional municipality: Durham
- Municipality: Clarington
- Time zone: UTC-5 (EST)
  - Summer (DST): UTC-4 (EDT)
- Area codes: 905 and 289

Tyrone is a community in Ontario, Canada, incorporated in the municipality of Clarington. It was named after County Tyrone in Ireland. Tyrone is located about 12 km north of the town of Bowmanville.

== History ==
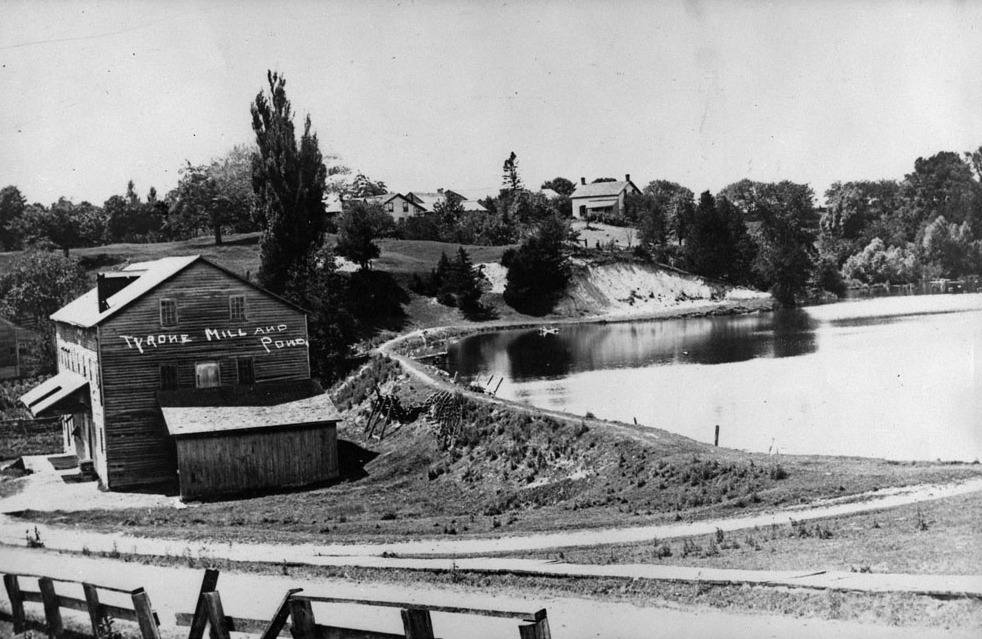
Tyrone Mills and area, circa 1913

After Darlington township was surveyed in 1792, settlement in the area around the current village of Tyrone began in about 1810. By 1840, there were a number of settlers in the area; most were either Irish or from Devon and Cornwall. The two groups met for a lacrosse match; the Irish team won, and so were given the privilege of naming the newly formed village.

In 1867, Robert McLaughlin built two cutters on his family farm just to the west of Tyrone. Shortly after he founded the McLaughlin Carriage Works, which grew to be the largest carriage maker in the British Empire.

In 1880, there were about 300 people living in the village. There were three stores and a mill.

== Attractions ==
The Tyrone mill, erected in 1846, continues to grind grain and mill lumber using water power. In recent years it is a tourist stop, selling apple cider, local preserves, and freshly baked bread and doughnuts. There is also a blacksmith shop.

== Climate ==
Climate data for Tyrone
Month	Jan	Feb	Mar	Apr	May	Jun	Jul	Aug	Sep	Oct	Nov	Dec	Year
Record high °C (°F)	11.5 (52.7)	11.5 (52.7)	22.5 (72.5)	29.5 (85.1)	31.5 (88.7)	34.5 (94.1)	35 (95)	33.3 (91.9)	32.5 (90.5)	27.8 (82.0)	20 (68)	18 (64)	35 (95)
Mean daily maximum °C (°F)	−3.1 (26.4)	−2.1 (28.2)	3.1 (37.6)	10.7 (51.3)	18.1 (64.6)	23 (73)	25.7 (78.3)	24.6 (76.3)	20 (68)	13 (55)	5.9 (42.6)	−0.1 (31.8)	11.6 (52.9)
Daily mean °C (°F)	−7.7 (18.1)	−6.7 (19.9)	−1.6 (29.1)	5.6 (42.1)	12.3 (54.1)	17.1 (62.8)	19.9 (67.8)	18.9 (66.0)	14.5 (58.1)	8 (46)	2.1 (35.8)	−4.1 (24.6)	6.5 (43.7)
Mean daily minimum °C (°F)	−12.3 (9.9)	−11.3 (11.7)	−6.3 (20.7)	0.5 (32.9)	6.5 (43.7)	11.2 (52.2)	14 (57)	13.2 (55.8)	9 (48)	3 (37)	−1.7 (28.9)	−8.1 (17.4)	1.5 (34.7)
Record low °C (°F)	−33 (−27)	−30.6 (−23.1)	−27 (−17)	−17.2 (1.0)	−3.9 (25.0)	−0.6 (30.9)	3.3 (37.9)	1.1 (34.0)	−3 (27)	−9.4 (15.1)	−17.2 (1.0)	−31.5 (−24.7)	−33 (−27)
Average precipitation mm (inches)	80.3 (3.16)	59.5 (2.34)	72.1 (2.84)	79.2 (3.12)	75.7 (2.98)	80 (3.1)	76.1 (3.00)	88.6 (3.49)	93.7 (3.69)	77.5 (3.05)	91.8 (3.61)	78.4 (3.09)	952.8 (37.51)
Source: Environment Canada
