= Antrim, Nova Scotia =

Community in Nova Scotia, Canada

Antrim
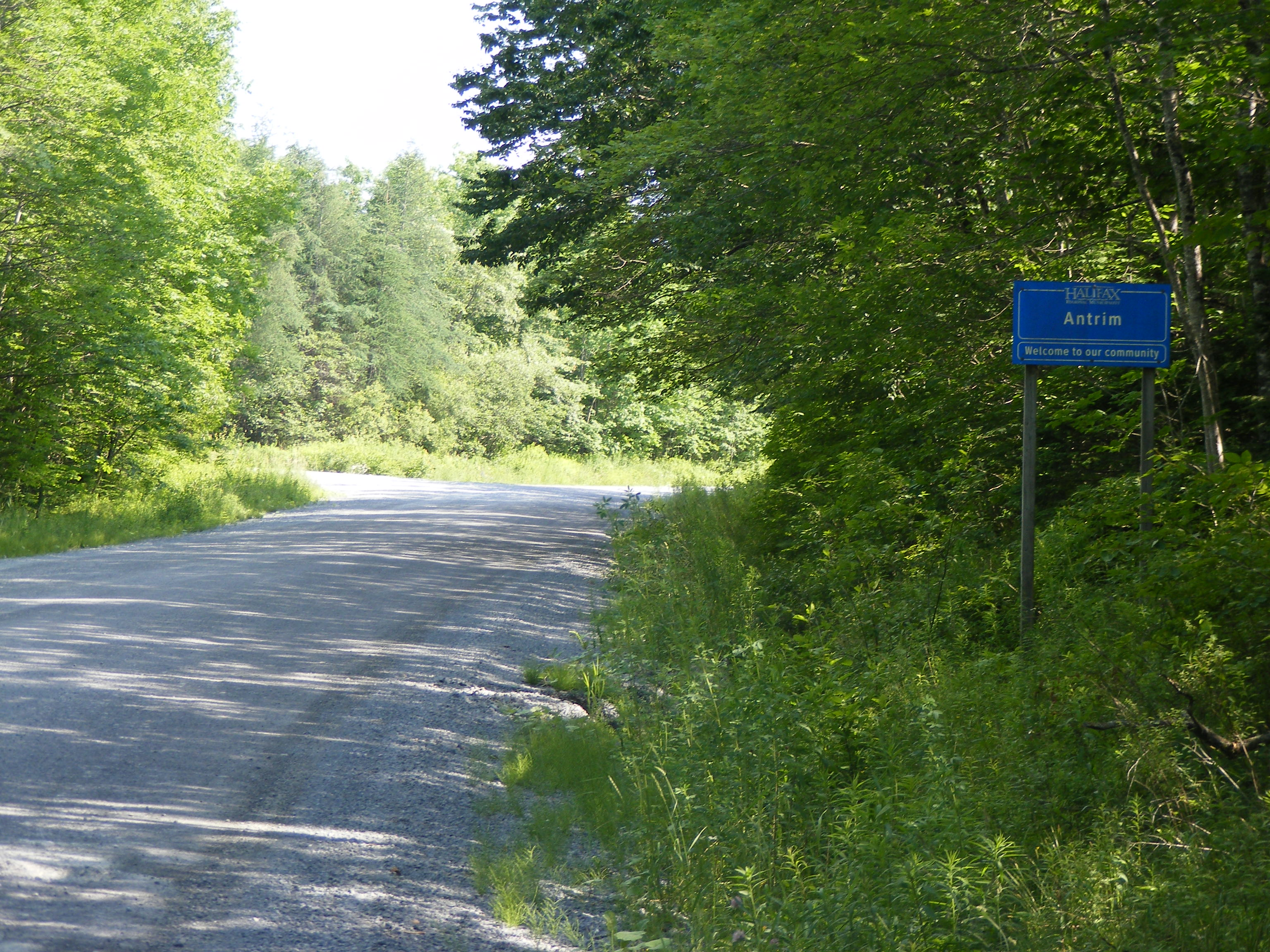

- Location within Nova Scotia
- Coordinates: 44°58′17″N 63°22′57″W
- Country: Canada
- Province: Nova Scotia
- Municipality: Halifax Regional Municipality
- Time zone: UTC-4 (AST)
  - Summer (DST): UTC-3 (ADT)
- Canadian Postal Code: B0N 2H0
- Area code: 902
- Telephone Exchange: 384

Antrim is a rural community in the Northwestern part of the Halifax Regional Municipality in the Musquodoboit Valley on the Antrim Road off Route 212.

According to the majority of residents, Antrim borders Carrolls Corner where the pavement on Antrim Road meets the gravel section. It was first settled by the Kerrs, McMichael and McMullin families who came from Antrim in Northern Ireland and it is named for that town or county. The community's early name was New Antrim.

Antrim is home to the 69 hectare Antrim Demonstration Woodlot, a woodlot under the management of Nova Forest Alliance. It was developed in 1998 as part of Canada's Model Forest Program.

Antrim Farms Ltd. is a large dairy farming operation run by the Schuurmans family.

Antrim was hit by a tornado on July 22, 2021.
