= Kildare, Oklahoma =

- Town
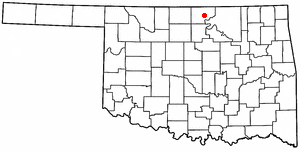
- Location of Kildare, Oklahoma
- Coordinates: 36°48′30″N 97°03′00″W
- Country: United States
- State: Oklahoma
- County: Kay

Area
  - Total: 0.14 sq mi (0.35 km^{2})
  - Land: 0.14 sq mi (0.35 km^{2})
  - Water: 0 sq mi (0.00 km^{2})
- Elevation: 1,122 ft (342 m)

Population (2020)
  - Total: 86
  - Density: 633.6/sq mi (244.64/km^{2})
- Time zone: UTC-6 (Central (CST))
  - Summer (DST): UTC-5 (CDT)
- FIPS code: 40-39800
- GNIS feature ID: 2412833

Kildare is a town in Kay County, Oklahoma, United States. As of the 2020 census, Kildare had a population of 86.

== History ==
According to the Encyclopedia of Oklahoma History and Culture, the Atchison, Topeka and Santa Fe Railroad built a section house, agent's cottage, a tool house and a depot at the future site of Kildare in 1892, a year before the opening of the Cherokee Outlet to settlers.

The railroad said it sold eight thousand tickets to Kildare for September 16, 1893, the opening day of the Cherokee Strip land run. Kildare boomed almost overnight. A post office was established on October 24, 1893. The town was incorporated by the Territorial Legislature on March 2, 1905. However, the lack of water limited its future. The highest population ever recorded in the U. S. census was 216 in 1910. Three times fires destroyed the business district, and fewer businesses rebuilt each time.

It was named after County Kildare in Ireland.

== Geography ==
According to the United States Census Bureau, the town has a total area of 0.2 square miles (0.52 km^{2}), all land.

== Demographics ==
Historical population
| Census | Pop. | Note | %± |
|---|---|---|---|
| 1910 | 216 | | — |
| 1920 | 146 | | −32.4% |
| 1930 | 160 | | 9.6% |
| 1940 | 137 | | −14.4% |
| 1950 | 155 | | 13.1% |
| 1960 | 124 | | −20.0% |
| 1970 | 79 | | −36.3% |
| 1980 | 112 | | 41.8% |
| 1990 | 94 | | −16.1% |
| 2000 | 92 | | −2.1% |
| 2010 | 100 | | 8.7% |
| 2020 | 86 | | −14.0% |
U.S. Decennial Census

=== 2020 census ===
As of the 2020 census, Kildare had a population of 86. The median age was 53.7 years. 10.5% of residents were under the age of 18 and 29.1% of residents were 65 years of age or older. For every 100 females there were 95.5 males, and for every 100 females age 18 and over there were 87.8 males age 18 and over.

0.0% of residents lived in urban areas, while 100.0% lived in rural areas.

There were 37 households in Kildare, of which 45.9% had children under the age of 18 living in them. Of all households, 48.6% were married-couple households, 18.9% were households with a male householder and no spouse or partner present, and 24.3% were households with a female householder and no spouse or partner present. About 13.5% of all households were made up of individuals and 5.4% had someone living alone who was 65 years of age or older.

There were 37 housing units, of which 0.0% were vacant. The homeowner vacancy rate was 0.0% and the rental vacancy rate was 0.0%.

Racial composition as of the 2020 census
| Race | Number | Percent |
|---|---|---|
| White | 71 | 82.6% |
| Black or African American | 0 | 0.0% |
| American Indian and Alaska Native | 10 | 11.6% |
| Asian | 0 | 0.0% |
| Native Hawaiian and Other Pacific Islander | 1 | 1.2% |
| Some other race | 0 | 0.0% |
| Two or more races | 4 | 4.7% |
| Hispanic or Latino (of any race) | 4 | 4.7% |

=== 2000 census ===
As of the 2000 census, there were 92 people, 37 households, and 29 families residing in the town. The population density was 577.2 people per square mile (222.0/km^{2}). The average household size was 2.49 and the average family size was 2.79.

The median income for a household in the town was $16,250, and the median income for a family was $25,313. Males had a median income of $28,750 versus $16,250 for females. The per capita income for the town was $13,798. There were 37.0% of families and 37.3% of the population living below the poverty line, including 44.1% of under eighteens and 16.7% of those over 64.

== See also ==
- List of municipalities in Oklahoma
