= Avoca, Florida =

Unincorporated community in Florida, U.S.

Coordinates: 30°34′41″N 83°01′36″W

Avoca is an unincorporated community in Hamilton County, Florida, United States.

== Geography ==
Avoca is located at latitude 30.578 and longitude -83.027 and its elevation is 118 feet. Surrounding state roads include State Road 150 and State Road 390. The surrounding US Highway is Highway 129.

Avoca was a turpentine/farming community for many years. Farming and plantation operations created the small community and Turpentine maintained it later. In 1916, it was a prosperous community located in Hamilton County Florida around the junction of CR 150 and US HWY 129. Hebron Cemetery supported the community and Church was held at Bakers Mill. Miller's Crossing was a few miles from Avoca. Leonard Ezekiel "L.E." Miller had a substantial plantation farm there and housed the commissary or general store where Boots (Brogans), Jeans, mostly overalls, Georgia knits (socks) and hickory striped shirts were sold and nearly uniform wear in the area. The community had several schools in a four to five mile area.

== Nearby locations ==
Location	Distance (km)
Alapaha	3.3
Rawls	5.7
Jennings	7.4
Bakers Mill	8.4
Jasper	10
Potter, Florida	12
West Lake	12
Melrose	13
Adams	13
Kennedy Still	14
