= Limerick, Georgia =

Unincorporated community in Georgia, U.S.

Coordinates: 31°50′13″N 81°23′09″W

Limerick is an unincorporated community in Liberty County, in the U.S. state of Georgia.

== History ==
A post office called Limerick was established in 1895, and remained in operation until 1900. The community was named after Limerick, in Ireland, the native home of a large share of the early settlers.
