= Tramore, Ontario =

Community in Ontario, Canada

Coordinates: 45.621°N 77.465°W

Location of Tramore in Ontario

Tramore is a community in Renfrew County, Ontario. It was named after the town of Tramore in Ireland.
