= Athlone, California =

Unincorporated community in Merced County, California, United States

Athlone
- Unincorporated community
- Location in California
- Coordinates: 37°12′29″N 120°21′29″W
- Country: United States
- State: California
- County: Merced
- Elevation: 207 ft (63 m)

Athlone is an unincorporated community in Merced County, California, United States. It is located on the Southern Pacific Railroad, 6 miles (9.7 km) west-southwest of Le Grand, at an elevation of 207 feet (63 m).

A post office was operated in Athlone from 1881 to 1905, with a closure during part of 1901, from 1906 to 1909, and from 1914 to 1937.

Athlone was platted in 1873, soon after completion of the railroad through the San Joaquin Valley, and was at first named Plainsburg Station. The town was renamed after an Irish immigrant named James Gilhane opened a saloon called Athlone House, named after the Irish town of Athlone, in County Westmeath. The town had a number of businesses and even a normal school for a brief period around the turn of the twentieth century. However, the main economic activities were cattle ranching and wheat farming. Most of the town was destroyed in 1950 when US 99 was expanded to a freeway. A schoolhouse remained active in Athlone until the early 1940s.

The US Army built the Athlone Auxiliary Field (1942–1945) to train World War II pilots in Athlone.
