= Kildare Township, Swift County, Minnesota =

Kildare Township, Minnesota
- Township
- Location within the state of Minnesota Kildare Township, Minnesota (the United States)
- Coordinates: 45°16′33″N 95°27′0″W
- Country: United States
- State: Minnesota
- County: Swift

Area
  - Total: 35.2 sq mi (91.1 km^{2})
  - Land: 34.8 sq mi (90.2 km^{2})
  - Water: 0.35 sq mi (0.9 km^{2})
- Elevation: 1,063 ft (324 m)

Population (2020)
  - Total: 134
  - Density: 5.4/sq mi (2.1/km^{2})
- Time zone: UTC-6 (Central (CST))
  - Summer (DST): UTC-5 (CDT)
- FIPS code: 27-33092
- GNIS feature ID: 0664628

Kildare Township is a township in Swift County, Minnesota, United States. The population was 134 at the 2020 census.

Kildare Township was organized in 1875, and named after the town and county of Kildare in Ireland.

== Geography ==
According to the United States Census Bureau, the township has a total area of 35.2 square miles (91 km^{2}), of which 34.8 square miles (90 km^{2}) is land and 0.3 square miles (0.78 km^{2}) (1.00%) is water.

== Demographics ==
As of the census of 2000, there were 192 people, 68 households, and 51 families residing in the township. The population density was 5.5 inhabitants per square mile (2.1/km^{2}). There were 71 housing units at an average density of 2.0 per square mile (0.77/km^{2}). The racial makeup of the township was 100.00% White.

There were 68 households, out of which 36.8% had children under the age of 18 living with them, 64.7% were married couples living together, 1.5% had a female householder with no husband present, and 25.0% were non-families. 20.6% of all households were made up of individuals, and 7.4% had someone living alone who was 65 years of age or older. The average household size was 2.82 and the average family size was 3.24.

In the township the population was spread out, with 29.7% under the age of 18, 6.8% from 18 to 24, 26.0% from 25 to 44, 22.4% from 45 to 64, and 15.1% who were 65 years of age or older. The median age was 37 years. For every 100 females, there were 102.1 males. For every 100 females age 18 and over, there were 110.9 males.

The median income for a household in the township was $39,375, and the median income for a family was $47,955. Males had a median income of $30,208 versus $10,625 for females. The per capita income for the township was $18,827. About 5.2% of families and 8.0% of the population were below the poverty line, including none of those under the age of eighteen and 14.3% of those 65 or over.
