= Mount Dungarvan =

Mountain in the state of Canada

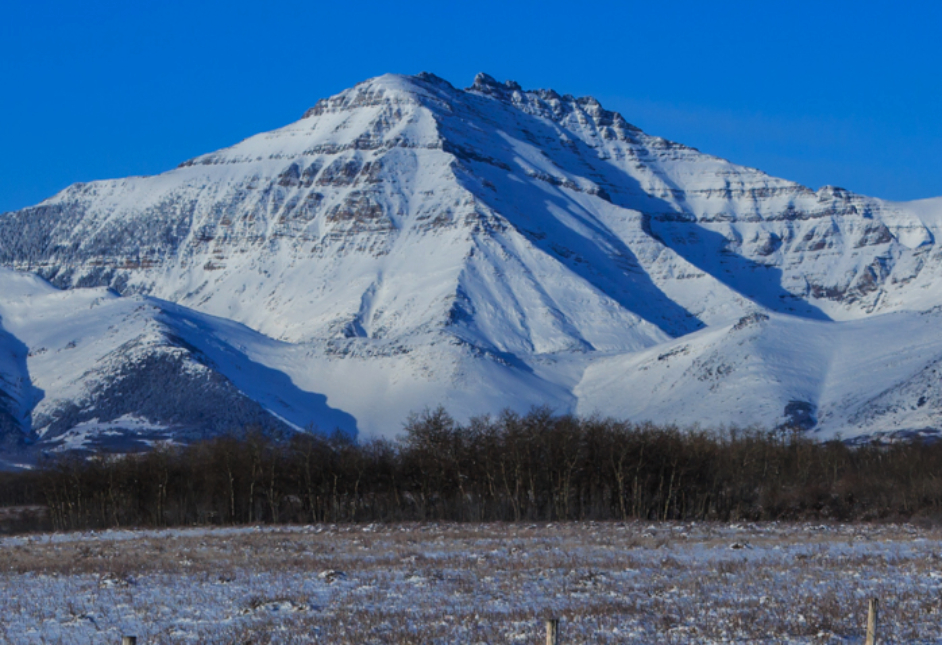
- Mount Dungarvan

Highest point
- Elevation: 2,575 m (8,448 ft)
- Prominence: 243 m (797 ft)
- Parent peak: Cloudy Peak (2591 m)
- Listing: Mountains of Alberta
- Coordinates: 49°09′17″N 113°58′18″W

Naming
- Etymology: Dungarvan, Ireland

Geography
- Location within Alberta Location within Canada
- Interactive map of Mount Dungarvan
- Location: Alberta, Canada
- Parent range: Canadian Rockies
- Topo map: NTS 82H4 Waterton Lakes

Geology
- Rock age: Cambrian

Climbing
- Easiest route: Scramble

Mount Dungarvan is a 2,575-metre (8,448-foot) mountain summit located in Waterton Lakes National Park, in the Canadian Rockies of Alberta, Canada. Its nearest higher peak is Cloudy Peak, 2.8 km (1.7 mi) to the west.

== History ==
The mountain was named in 1943 after the town of Dungarvan in Ireland. Dungarvan is also the Irish term for a rough and broken mountain.

The mountain's name became official in 1943 by the Geographical Names Board of Canada.

== Geology ==
Like other mountains in Waterton Lakes National Park, Mount Dungarvan is composed of sedimentary rock laid down during the Precambrian to Jurassic periods. Formed in shallow seas, this sedimentary rock was pushed east and over the top of younger Cretaceous period rock during the Laramide orogeny. The summit is a series of basalt pinnacles from the Purcell Sill.

== Climate ==
Based on the Köppen climate classification, Mount Dungarvan is located in a subarctic climate with cold, snowy winters, and mild summers. Temperatures can drop below −20 °C (−4 °F) with wind chill factors below −30 °C (−22 °F). Precipitation runoff from the mountain drains into tributaries of Waterton River.

== Gallery ==
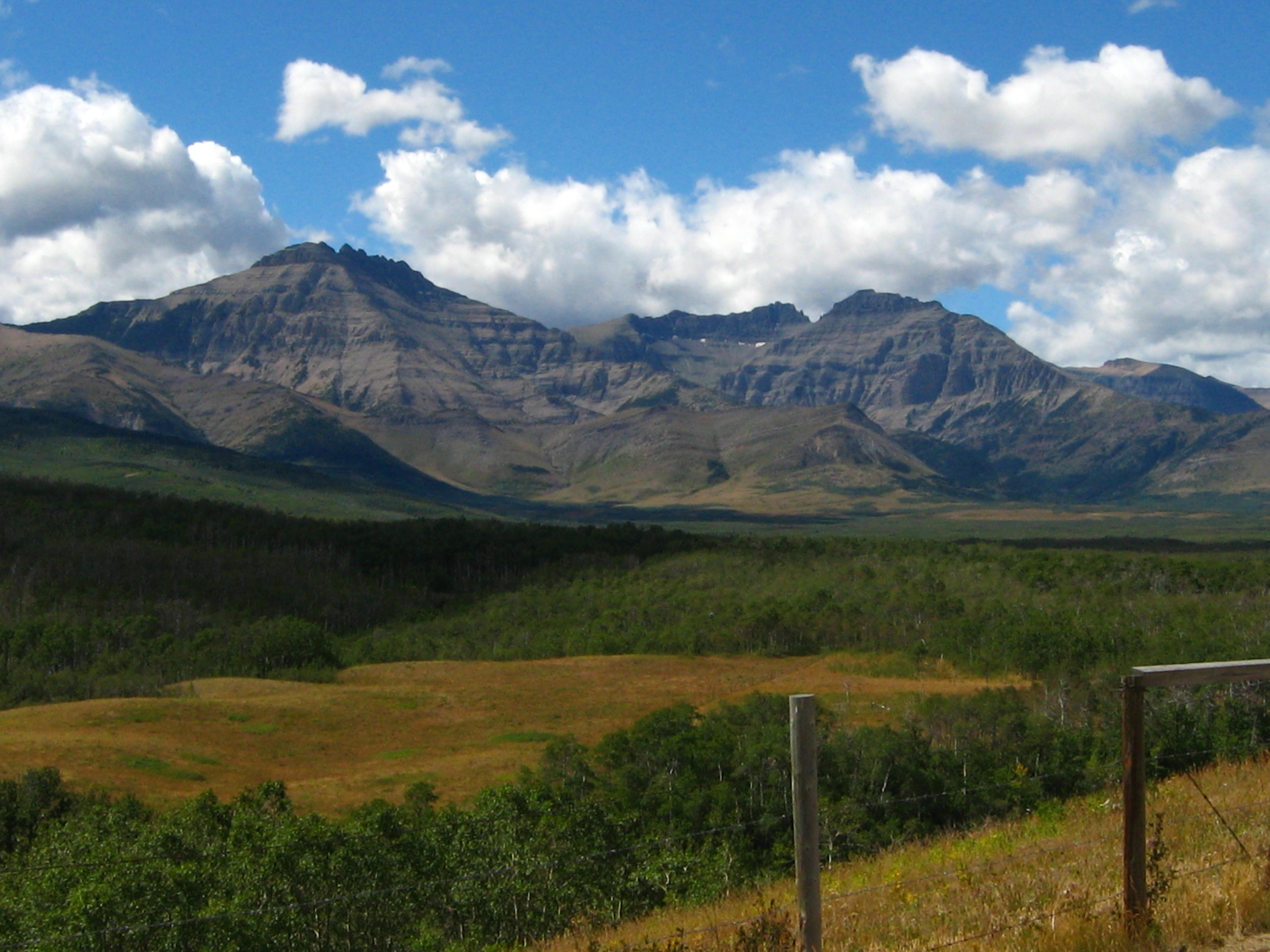
Mount Dungarvan left of centre

== See also ==
- Geography of Alberta
- List of mountains in the Canadian Rockies
