= Erin, Jasper County, Texas =

Unincorporated community in Jasper County, Texas

Coordinates: 30°46′47″N 93°59′49″W

Erin is an unincorporated community in Jasper County, in the U.S. state of Texas.

== History ==
A post office was established at Erin in 1847, and remained in operation until 1923. The community was perhaps named for Erin, a poetic name for Ireland. Erin was formerly a station on the Atchison, Topeka and Santa Fe Railway.
