= Belfast, Missouri =

Unincorporated community in Missouri

Coordinates: 36°51′59″N 94°27′16″W

Belfast is an unincorporated community in Newton County, in the U.S. state of Missouri. The community lies above the south bank of Lost Creek and is approximately four miles west of Neosho. The St. Louis–San Francisco Railway passes the community along Lost Creek valley.

== History ==
Belfast was founded ca. 1880, and named after Belfast, in Ireland, the ancestral home of a share of the first settlers. Until 1887, it was called Iron Switch. A post office called Belfast was established in 1889, and remained in operation until 1901. In 1925, Belfast had 25 inhabitants.
