= Kilkenny, Minnesota =

City in Minnesota, United States

- City
- Location of Kilkenny, Minnesota
- Coordinates: 44°18′55″N 93°34′27″W
- Country: United States
- State: Minnesota
- County: Le Sueur

Government
  - Type: Mayor - Council
  - Mayor: Cameron Hankins (as of 2020)

Area
  - Total: 0.14 sq mi (0.35 km^{2})
  - Land: 0.14 sq mi (0.35 km^{2})
  - Water: 0 sq mi (0.00 km^{2})
- Elevation: 1,056 ft (322 m)

Population (2020)
  - Total: 148
  - Density: 1,108.6/sq mi (428.02/km^{2})
- Time zone: UTC-6 (Central (CST))
  - Summer (DST): UTC-5 (CDT)
- FIPS code: 27-33110
- GNIS feature ID: 2395528
- Website: www.kilkennymn.com

Kilkenny is a city in Le Sueur County, Minnesota, United States. As of the 2020 census, the population was 148, up from 134 as of the 2010 census.

It was twinned with the city and county of Kilkenny in Ireland in 2013.

== Geography ==
Kilkenny city, which borders Kilkenny Township, is located in Le Sueur County. According to the United States Census Bureau, the city has a total area of 0.14 square miles (0.36 km^{2}), all land.

== History ==
A number of Irish people moved to the area in the 1850s. Kilkenny Township and Kilkenny city were named, by these settlers, after County Kilkenny and Kilkenny in Ireland. The city of Kilkenny was incorporated, independent of the township, in June 1883. The area was previously served by the Minneapolis and St. Louis Railway.

== Amenities ==
As of 2026, Kilkenny had a bank and post office. The local Catholic church, named for Saint Canice, is in the Archdiocese of Saint Paul and Minneapolis. Little Irishman's Park, which has a playground and baseball diamond, is located next to Saint Canice's church.

== Demographics ==
Historical population
Census	Pop.	Note	%±
1880	89		—
1900	245		—
1910	208		−15.1%
1920	218		4.8%
1930	227		4.1%
1940	214		−5.7%
1950	174		−18.7%
1960	221		27.0%
1970	182		−17.6%
1980	177		−2.7%
1990	167		−5.6%
2000	148		−11.4%
2010	134		−9.5%
2020	148		10.4%
U.S. Decennial Census

=== 2010 census ===
As of the census of 2010, there were 134 people, 53 households, and 38 families living in the city. The population density was 957.1 inhabitants per square mile (369.5/km^{2}). There were 63 housing units at an average density of 450.0 per square mile (173.7/km^{2}). The racial makeup of the city was 99.3% White and 0.7% from other races. Hispanic or Latino of any race were 0.7% of the population.

There were 53 households, of which 41.5% had children under the age of 18 living with them, 52.8% were married couples living together, 9.4% had a female householder with no husband present, 9.4% had a male householder with no wife present, and 28.3% were non-families. 26.4% of all households were made up of individuals, and 15.1% had someone living alone who was 65 years of age or older. The average household size was 2.53 and the average family size was 3.00.

The median age in the city was 37.5 years. 27.6% of residents were under the age of 18; 10.5% were between the ages of 18 and 24; 20.9% were from 25 to 44; 29.1% were from 45 to 64; and 11.9% were 65 years of age or older. The gender makeup of the city was 52.2% male and 47.8% female.

=== 2000 census ===
As of the census of 2000, there were 148 people, 59 households, and 40 families living in the city. The population density was 1,205.8 inhabitants per square mile (465.6/km^{2}). There were 61 housing units at an average density of 497.0 per square mile (191.9/km^{2}). The racial makeup of the city was 91.89% White, 2.03% Asian, 5.41% from other races, and 0.68% from two or more races. Hispanic or Latino of any race were 5.41% of the population.

There were 59 households, out of which 30.5% had children under the age of 18 living with them, 49.2% were married couples living together, 8.5% had a female householder with no husband present, and 32.2% were non-families. 28.8% of all households were made up of individuals, and 13.6% had someone living alone who was 65 years of age or older. The average household size was 2.51 and the average family size was 3.03.

In the city, the population distribution was as follows: 25.0% were under the age of 18, 9.5% were between 18 and 24, 30.4% were from 25 to 44, 21.6% were from 45 to 64, and 13.5% were 65 years of age or older. The median age was 36 years. For every 100 females, there were 100.0 males, and for every 100 females aged 18 and over, there were 117.6 males.

The median income for a household in the city was $39,583, and the median income for a family was $42,188. Males had a median income of $34,500 versus $20,313 for females. The per capita income for the city was $16,198. There were none of the families and 3.6% of the population living below the poverty line, including no under eighteens and none of those over 64.
