= Belfast, Georgia =

Unincorporated community in Georgia, U.S.

Coordinates: 31°49′28″N 81°17′30″W

Belfast is an unincorporated community in Bryan County, Georgia, United States. It is part of Savannah–Hinesville–Statesboro Combined Statistical Area.

== History ==
A post office called Belfast was established in 1904, and remained in operation until 1916. The community takes its name from Belfast, the capital and largest city in Northern Ireland.
