= Belfast, Nebraska =

Unincorporated community in Nebraska, United States

- Ghost Town
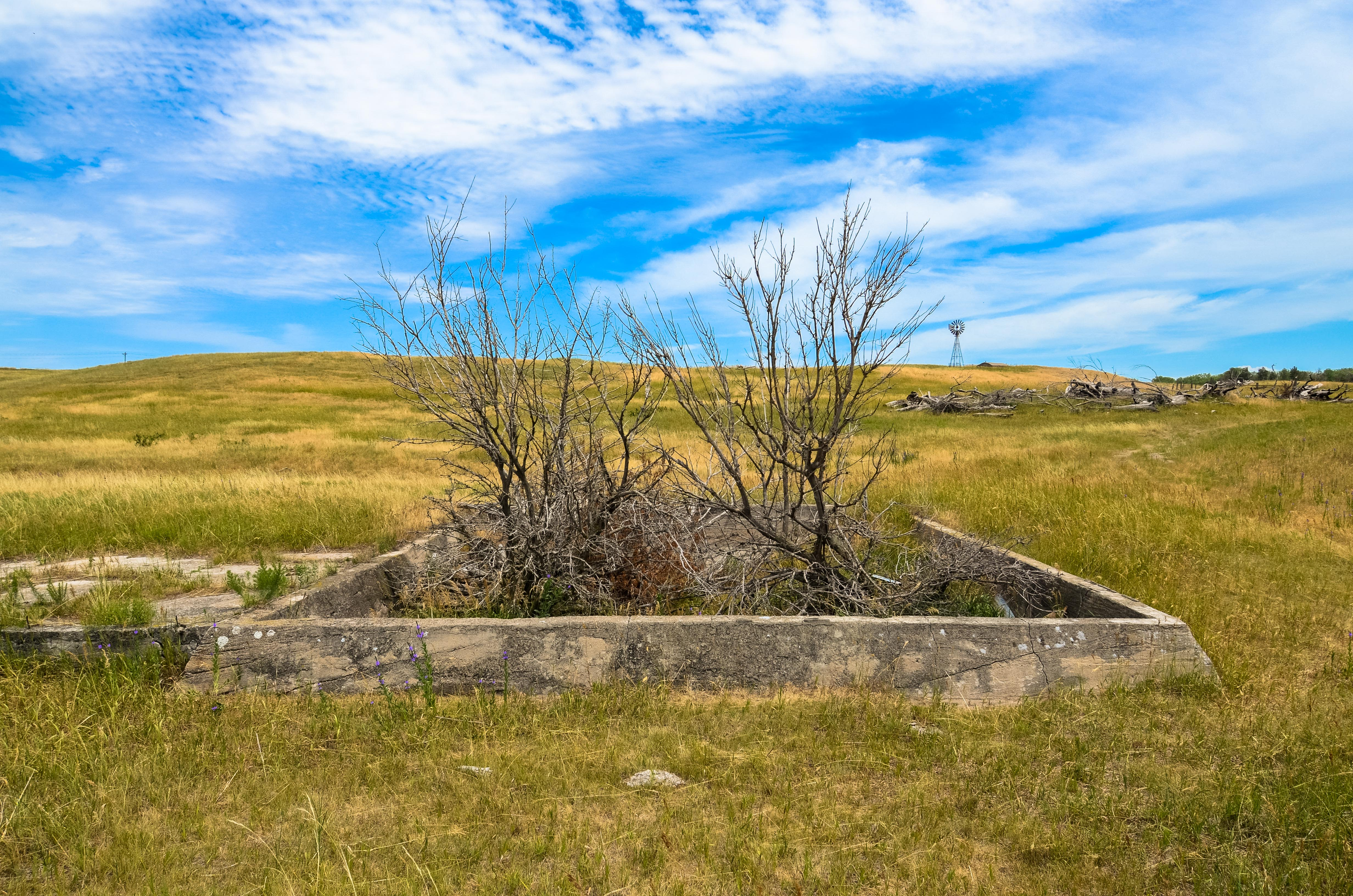

- Location within the state of Nebraska
- Coordinates: 41°38′15″N 98°37′00″W
- Country: United States
- State: Nebraska
- County: Greeley
- Elevation: 2,178 ft (664 m)
- Time zone: UTC-6 (Central (CST))
  - Summer (DST): UTC-5 (CDT)
- ZIP code: 68842
- FIPS code: 31-03800
- GNIS feature ID: 827292

Belfast is a ghost town in Greeley County, Nebraska, in the United States.

== History ==
The railroad was extended to Belfast in the late 19th century. The community takes its name from Belfast, in Northern Ireland.

Belfast had a post office briefly from 1908 until 1909.

While no buildings are still standing at the site, deep holes indicate foundations and cellars. Numerous concrete floors can be seen and large pieces of metal are scattered throughout the site. The railroad grade is very clear to someone looking down from a nearby hill. The area is now used for grazing cattle.
