= Kilkenny Township, Le Sueur County, Minnesota =

Township in Minnesota, United States

Kilkenny Township
- Township
- Location within the state of Minnesota Kilkenny Township (the United States)
- Coordinates: 44°19′15″N 93°35′31″W
- Country: United States
- State: Minnesota
- County: Le Sueur

Area
  - Total: 36.1 sq mi (93.4 km^{2})
  - Land: 33.8 sq mi (87.6 km^{2})
  - Water: 2.2 sq mi (5.8 km^{2})
- Elevation: 1,070 ft (326 m)

Population (2000)
  - Total: 393
  - Density: 12/sq mi (4.5/km^{2})
- Time zone: UTC-6 (Central (CST))
  - Summer (DST): UTC-5 (CDT)
- FIPS code: 27-33128
- GNIS feature ID: 0664630

Kilkenny Township is a township in Le Sueur County, Minnesota, United States. The population was 393 at the 2000 census.

It was named after Kilkenny in Ireland.

== Geography ==
According to the United States Census Bureau, the township has a total area of 36.1 square miles (93 km^{2}), of which 33.8 square miles (88 km^{2}) is land and 2.2 square miles (5.7 km^{2}) (6.21%) is water.

== Demographics ==
As of the census of 2000, there were 393 people, 157 households, and 113 families residing in the township. The population density was 11.6 inhabitants per square mile (4.5/km^{2}). There were 173 housing units at an average density of 5.1 per square mile (2.0/km^{2}). The racial makeup of the township was 97.78% White, and 2.21% from two or more races. Hispanic or Latino of any race were 1.02% of the population.

There were 157 households, out of which 26.8% had children under the age of 18 living with them, 63.7% were married couples living together, 5.7% had a female householder with no husband present, and 27.4% were non-families. 23.6% of all households were made up of individuals, and 10.2% had someone living alone who was 65 years of age or older. The average household size was 2.50 and the average family size was 2.99.

In the township the population was spread out, with 23.7% under the age of 18, 6.6% from 18 to 24, 26.0% from 25 to 44, 30.8% from 45 to 64, and 13.0% who were 65 years of age or older. The median age was 42 years. For every 100 females, there were 104.7 males. For every 100 females age 18 and over, there were 104.1 males.

The median income for a household in the township was $45,625, and the median income for a family was $149,063. Males had a median income of $145,139 versus $22,188 for females. The per capita income for the township was $21,346. About 9.5% of families and 10.0% of the population were below the poverty line, including 5.1% of those under age 18 and 15.8% of those age 65 or over.

== See also ==
- Kilkenny, Minnesota
