= Belfast, Highland County, Ohio =

Unincorporated community in Ohio, U.S.

Coordinates: 39°03′46″N 83°31′57″W

Belfast is an unincorporated community in Highland County, in the U.S. state of Ohio.

== History ==
Belfast was founded in 1834, and named after Belfast, in Northern Ireland. The post office was first established under the name Bell in 1845, the name was changed to Belfast in 1910, and the post office closed in 1944.
