= Belfast, Clermont County, Ohio =

Unincorporated community in Ohio, U.S.

Coordinates: 39°10′28″N 84°8′28″W

Belfast is an unincorporated community in Clermont County, in the U.S. state of Ohio.

== History ==
The community was named after Belfast, Northern Ireland, the native land of a share of the first settlers. A post office called Belfast was established in 1840, and remained in operation until 1907. Besides the post office, Belfast had a country store. Its current mailing address for the area is for Goshen, Ohio 45122.
