= List of county roads in Le Sueur County, Minnesota =

- Standard county road marker

Highway names
- Interstates: Interstate X (I-X)
- US Highways: U.S. Highway X (US X)
- County State-Aid Highways: County State-Aid Highway X (CSAH X)
- County Roads: County Road X (CR X)

System links
- County roads of Minnesota; Le Sueur County

The following is an incomplete list of county-maintained roads in Le Sueur County, Minnesota, United States.

== CR 1–CR 20 ==
County Road 1 runs along the Le Sueur and Rice County line. Le Sueur Avenue (Rice County Road 12) becomes Le Sueur County Road 1, heads north for 1 mile (1.6 km), and terminates at Dodd Road (CR 2).

County Road 2 runs west as a continuation of Dodd Road (Rice County Road 10), through Kilkenny, and after crossing State Highway 13 (MN 13), continues west on 440th Street. At 201st Avenue, County Road 2 heads north on 201st Avenue, until it becomes Dodd Road, briefly runs concurrently with County Road 11, then heads west-southwest to Cleveland, where it terminates at 10th Street South (CR 15). It is about 18 miles (29 km) long.

County Road 3 runs north as a continuation of Waseca County Road 24 on 153rd Avenue, and enters Waterville and the southern segment terminates at the intersection of South Reed Street and Paquin Street West (CR 14) in the center of the community. The northern segment of County Road 3 begins at the northeastern edge of Waterville, at the intersection of Waterville Road with State Highway 13 (MN 13), heads north along Waterville Road and 151st Avenue, through Kilkenny, continues north on Kilkenny Road and 151st Avenue, then on 9th Street Southeast into Montgomery. It is about 14 miles (23 km) long.

County Road 4 runs from County Road 3 into Rice County. It is about 2 miles long.

County Road 5 runs from Cordova north to Clear Lake. It is about 7 miles long.

County Road 6 runs from State Highway 60 (MN 60) and heads north for 1.5 miles (2.4 km) on 175th Avenue, terminating at Ridge Road (CR 14)

County Road 7 runs from Cordova south to County Road 12. It is about 5 miles long.

County Road 8 runs from State Highway 13 (MN 13) to County Road 3. It is about 1 1/4 miles long.

County Road 9 runs from County Road 2 southeast to County Road 7. It is about 6 miles long.

County Road 10 runs from State Highway 13 (MN 13) to Rice County. It is about 3 miles long.

County Road 11 is the longest county road in the county. It runs from Elysian north to Le Center and to State Highway 19 (MN 19). It is about 30 miles long.

County Road 12 runs from County Road 13 southeast to State Highway 13 (MN 13) just above Waterville. It is about 9 miles long.

County Road 13 starts below Cleveland at County Road 15 and ends at County Road 11. It is about 12 miles long.

County Road 14 runs from Elysian to Waterville. It is about 6 miles long.

County Road 15 runs south from County Road 26 through Cleveland into Blue Earth County. It is about 13 miles long.

County Road 16 takes over Blue Earth County Road 2. It run east to County Road 13. It is about 6 miles long.

County Road 18 runs from County Road 21 to County Road 13. It is about 10 miles long.

County Road 19 runs from County Road 18 south to Blue Earth County Road 2. It is about 4 miles long.

County Road 20 runs from 281st Avenue (CR 15) westward on 410th Street, and terminates 4.7 miles (7.6 km) at the intersection of it with Ottawa Road (CR 23).

== CR 21–CR 40 ==
County Road 21 runs from State Highway 99 (MN 99) through Kasota to Blue Earth County. It is about 8 miles long.

County Road 22 runs along the former alignment of MN 112 through Le Sueur from US 169 to MN 99 near Le Center.

County Road 23 runs from County Road 22 through Ottawa and ends at State Highway 99 (MN 99). It is about 7 miles long.

County Road 24 runs from County Road 15 to County Road 11. It is about 4 miles long.

County Road 26 runs from County Road 22 in Le Sueur. It goes through Montgomery into Rice County. It is about 17 miles long.

County Road 28 runs from County Road 22 in Le Sueur. It goes into Rice County. It is about 20 miles long.

County Road 29 runs from County Road 143 into Rice County. It is about 4 miles long.

County Road 30 runs from County Road 26 to State Highway 19 (MN 19). It runs through Heidelberg. It is about 7 miles long.

County Road 31 runs from County Road 28 to State Highway 19 (MN 19) at Union Hill. It is about 4 miles long.

County Road 32 runs from County Road 26 to State Highway 19 (MN 19). It is about 9 miles long.

County Road 33 runs from County Road 26 to County Road 28. It is about 4 miles long.

County Road 34 runs from U.S. Highway 169 to State Highway 19 (MN 19). It is about 2 1/2 miles long.

County Road 35 only runs in Le Sueur from County Road 26 to County Road 22. It is about 1 1/2 miles long.

County Road 36 runs from County Road 23 in Ottawa to County Road 22 in Le Sueur. It is about 6 miles long.

County Road 39 only runs in Le Center. It is about a half a mile long.

County Road 40 only runs in Le Center. It is about a half a mile long.

== CR 41–CR 62 ==
County Road 41 only runs in Kasota. It is about 1/4 of a mile long.

County Road 42 only runs in Kasota. It is about 900 feet long.

County Road 43 only runs in Kasota. It is about 1,000 feet long.

County Road 46 only runs Cleveland. It is about 1/4 of a mile long.

County Road 47 only runs Cleveland. It is about 1/4 of a mile long.

County Road 48 only runs Cleveland. It is about 200 ft long.

County Road 50 only runs in Elysian. It is about 1/2 of a mile long.

County Road 52 runs from County Road 22 to County Road 152. It is about 1 mile long.

County Road 56 only runs in Montgomery. It is about 1/2 of a mile long.

County Road 57 only runs in Montgomery. It is about 1/2 of a mile long.

County Road 58 only runs in New Prague. It is about 1/2 of a mile long.

County Road 61 runs from County Road 36 to County Road 22.

== CR 101 and up ==
County Road 101 runs from Kasota Township Road 140 to County Road 19. It is about 4 miles long.

County Road 102 runs from State Highway 99 (MN 99) to State Highway 22 (MN 22) at Kasota. It is about 2 miles long.

County Road 103 runs from County Road 19 to County Road 15. It is 6.8 miles long.

County Road 104 runs from County Road 16 to County Road 18. It is 5 miles long.

County Road 105 runs from County Road 18 to County Road 15. It is 3.6 miles long.

County Road 106 runs from County Road 110 to County Road 18. It is 7.4 miles long.

County Road 107 runs from County Road 21 to County Road 18. It is 1.8 miles long.

County Road 108 runs from State Highway 99 (MN 99) to County Road 110. It is 4.4 miles long.

County Road 109 runs from County Road 110 to County Road 22.

County Road 110 runs from County Road 23, intersects State Highway 99, and ends at County Road 5. It is 14.3 miles long.

County Road 112 runs from County Road 2, intersects State Highway 99 and County Road 22 which ends at County Road 26. It is 8.1 miles long.

County Road 113 runs from County Road 110, it intersects MN 99 and County Road 22 which ends at County Road 26, It is 5 miles long.

County Road 114 runs from County Road 2, intersects State Highway 99 in Le Center, and ends at County Road 26.

County Road 115 runs from County Road 36, intersects County Road 22, and ends at Sharon Township Roads 66 and 54.

County Road 116 runs from Le Sueur and ends 6.8 miles to the east.

County Road 117 runs from Le Sueur to County Road 28. It is 2.5 miles long.

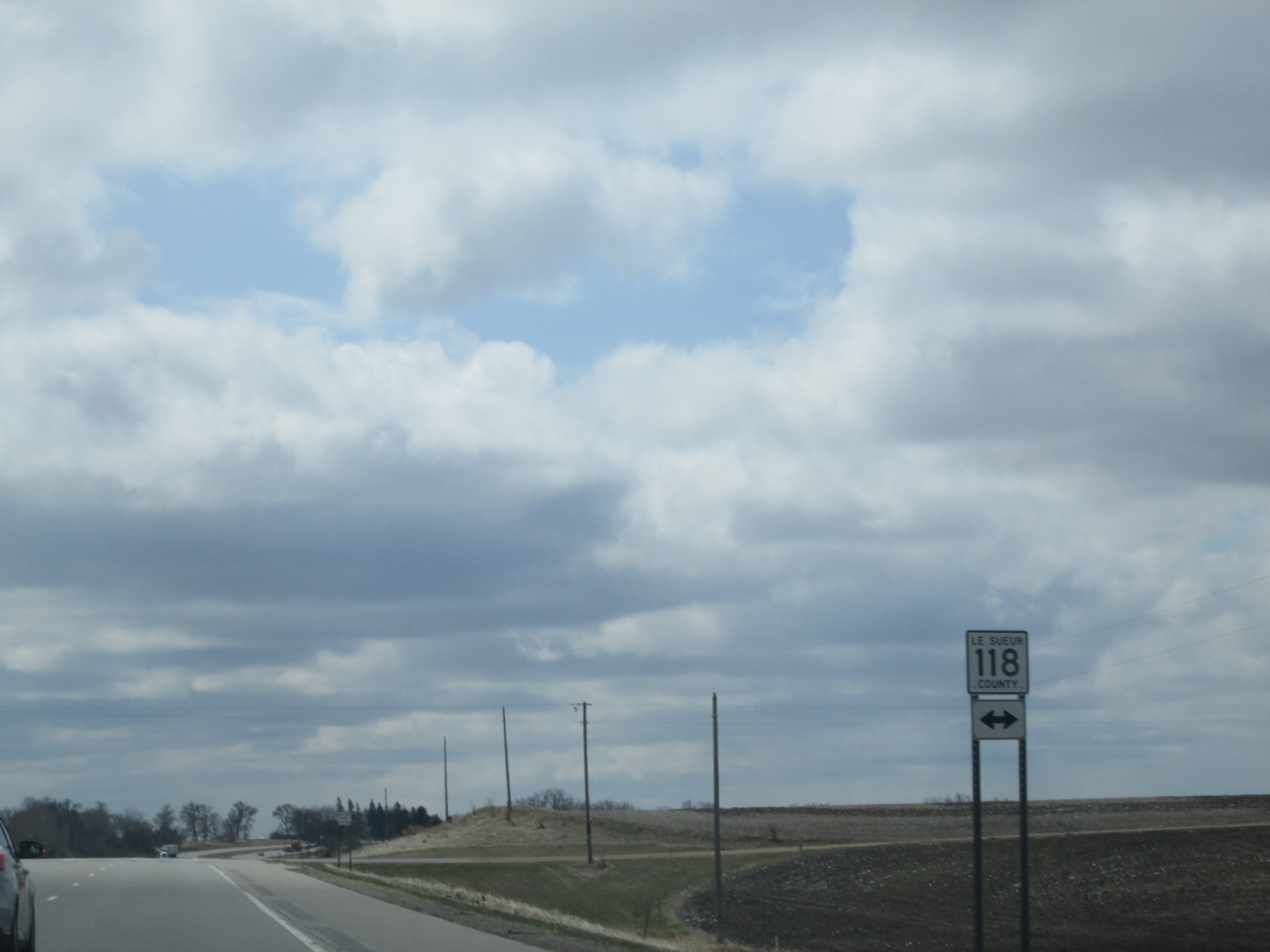
Intersection of CR 118 and US 169 in Tyrone Township.

County Road 118 runs from U.S. Highway 169 to County Road 28. It is 7.8 miles long.

County Road 119 runs from County Road 28 to State Highway 19. It is 3 miles long.

County Road 120 runs from County Road 118 to County Road 32. It is 2 miles long.

County Road 121 runs from County Road 26 to State Highway 19. It is 8.5 miles long.

County Road 122 runs from County Road 32 to County Road 30. It is 4.6 miles long.

County Road 123 runs from County Road 32 to County Road 26. It is 2.5 miles long.

County Road 124 runs from County Road 5. It is 2.5 miles long.

County Road 125 runs from County Road 30. It is 3.1 miles long.

County Road 126 runs from County Road 11 and 24 to County Road 5. It is 2 miles long.

County Road 128 runs from County Road 11 to County Road 7 and 2. It is 2.5 miles long.

County Road 131 runs from State Highway 13 (MN 13) in Waterville to County Road 132. It is 2.5 miles long.

County Road 132 runs from State Highway 13 to County Road 131. It is 2 miles long.

County Road 136 runs from State Highway 13 to Lake Volney. It is 5.8 miles long.

County Road 138 runs from County Road 136 to Rice County. It is 3 miles long.

County Road 139 runs from County Road 3 to County Road 137. It is 2 miles long.

County Road 140 runs from State Highway 99 to State Highway 13. It is 1.8 miles long.

== Route List ==
Number	Length (mi)	Length (km)	Southern or western terminus	Northern or eastern terminus	Local names	Formed	Removed	Notes
CSAH 1	1.0	1.6	—	—		—	—	
CSAH 2	18.0	29.0	—	—		—	—	
CSAH 3	14.0	22.5	—	—		—	—	
CSAH 4	2.0	3.2	—	—		—	—	
CSAH 5	7.0	11.3	—	—		—	—	
CSAH 6	1.5	2.4	—	—		—	—	
CSAH 7	5.0	8.0	—	—		—	—	
CSAH 8	1.3	2.1	—	—		—	—	
CSAH 9	6.0	9.7	—	—		—	—	
CSAH 10	3.0	4.8	—	—		—	—	
CSAH 11	30.0	48.3	—	—		—	—	
CSAH 12	9.0	14.5	—	—		—	—	
CSAH 13	12.0	19.3	—	—		—	—	
CSAH 14	6.0	9.7	—	—		—	—	
CSAH 15	13.0	20.9	—	—		—	—	
CSAH 16	6.0	9.7	—	—		—	—	
CSAH 18	10.0	16.1	—	—		—	—	
CSAH 19	4.0	6.4	—	—		—	—	
CSAH 20	4.7	7.6	—	—		—	—	
CSAH 21	8.0	12.9	—	—		—	—	
CSAH 23	7.0	11.3	—	—		—	—	
CSAH 24	4.0	6.4	—	—		—	—	
CSAH 26	17.0	27.4	—	—		—	—	
CSAH 28	20.0	32.2	—	—		—	—	
CSAH 29	4.0	6.4	—	—		—	—	
CSAH 30	7.0	11.3	—	—		—	—	
CSAH 31	4.0	6.4	—	—		—	—	
CSAH 32	9.0	14.5	—	—		—	—	
CSAH 33	4.0	6.4	—	—		—	—	
CSAH 34	2.5	4.0	—	—		—	—	
CSAH 35	1.5	2.4	—	—		—	—	
CSAH 36	6.0	9.7	—	—		—	—	
CSAH 39	0.5	0.80	—	—		—	—	
CSAH 40	0.5	0.80	—	—		—	—	
CSAH 41	0.3	0.48	—	—		—	—	
CSAH 42	0.2	0.32	—	—		—	—	
CSAH 43	0.2	0.32	—	—		—	—	
CSAH 46	0.3	0.48	—	—		—	—	
CSAH 47	0.3	0.48	—	—		—	—	
CSAH 48	0.05	0.080	—	—		—	—	
CSAH 50	0.4	0.64	—	—		—	—	
CSAH 52	1.0	1.6	—	—		—	—	
CSAH 56	0.3	0.48	—	—		—	—	
CSAH 57	0.3	0.48	—	—		—	—	
CSAH 58	0.3	0.48	—	—		—	—	
CSAH 61	—	—	—	—		—	—	
CR 101	4.0	6.4	—	—		—	—	
CR 102	2.0	3.2	—	—		—	—	
CR 103	6.8	10.9	—	—		—	—	
CR 104	5.0	8.0	—	—		—	—	
CR 105	3.6	5.8	—	—		—	—	
CR 106	7.4	11.9	—	—		—	—	
CR 107	1.8	2.9	—	—		—	—	
CR 108	4.4	7.1	—	—		—	—	
CR 109	—	—	—	—		—	—	
CR 110	14.3	23.0	—	—		—	—	
CR 112	8.1	13.0	—	—		—	—	
CR 113	5.0	8.0	—	—		—	—	
CR 114	—	—	—	—		—	—	
CR 115	—	—	—	—		—	—	
CR 116	6.8	10.9	—	—		—	—	
CR 117	2.5	4.0	—	—		—	—	
CR 118	7.8	12.6	—	—		—	—	
CR 119	3.0	4.8	—	—		—	—	
CR 120	2.0	3.2	—	—		—	—	
CR 121	8.5	13.7	—	—		—	—	
CR 122	4.6	7.4	—	—		—	—	
CR 123	2.5	4.0	—	—		—	—	
CR 124	2.5	4.0	—	—		—	—	
CR 125	3.1	5.0	—	—		—	—	
CR 126	2.0	3.2	—	—		—	—	
CR 128	2.5	4.0	—	—		—	—	
CR 131	2.5	4.0	—	—		—	—	
CR 132	2.0	3.2	—	—		—	—	
CR 136	5.8	9.3	—	—		—	—	
CR 138	3.0	4.8	—	—		—	—	
CR 139	2.0	3.2	—	—		—	—	
CR 140	1.8	2.9	—	—		—	—	

== See also ==
- County Road
- Le Sueur County
- List of Minnesota state highways
