= Marysburg, Minnesota =

Unincorporated community in Minnesota, US

- Unincorporated community
- Location within Minnesota Location within the United States
- Coordinates: 44°14′25″N 93°49′01″W
- Country: United States
- State: Minnesota
- Counties: Blue Earth; Le Sueur
- Townships: Jamestown; Washington
- Elevation: 1,050 ft (320 m)
- Time zone: UTC-6 (Central (CST))
  - Summer (DST): UTC-5 (CDT)
- ZIP code: 56063
- Area code: 507
- GNIS feature ID: 654821

Marysburg is an unincorporated community in Blue Earth and Le Sueur counties in the U.S. state of Minnesota.

The center of Marysburg is generally considered near the intersection of 243rd Street (County 16) and John Street. The junction of Le Sueur County Road 15 and Blue Earth County Road 26 is nearby.

Marysburg is located within Jamestown Township in Blue Earth County; and also located within Washington Township in Le Sueur County. From 1858 to 1903, the community had a post office. Marysburg is located within ZIP code 56063 based in Madison Lake.

Nearby places include Madison Lake, Elysian, Cleveland, Mankato, and Kasota.

Marysburg, a community at the south edge of Washington Township, in section 15, platted January 24, 1859, was named by its first settler, John L. Meagher, an immigrant from Ireland, who was its postmaster during many years, and was also the probate judge for Le Sueur County. The community is also at the north edge of Jamestown Township. Marysburg was originally settled by immigrants from both Ireland and Germany.
