= Lake Emily =

Lake Emily may refer to the following bodies and water and one ghost town:

== Lakes ==
=== United States ===
- Lake Emily, Mendocino County, California
- Lake Emily (Le Sueur County, Minnesota), Le Sueur County, Minnesota
- Lake Emily (McLeod County, Minnesota), McLeod County, Minnesota
- Lake Emily (Portage County, Wisconsin)
- Lake Emily (Dodge County, Wisconsin)

=== New Zealand ===
- Lake Emily (New Zealand)

== Ghost towns ==
- Lake Emily, Wisconsin
