= Kasota =

Kasota may refer to:

- Kasota, Minnesota, U.S.
- Kasota Lake, a lake in Kandiyohi County, Minnesota
- Kasota Township, Le Sueur County, Minnesota
- Kasota limestone, a dolomitic limestone
