= Dodd Road Discontiguous District =

- U.S. National Register of Historic Places
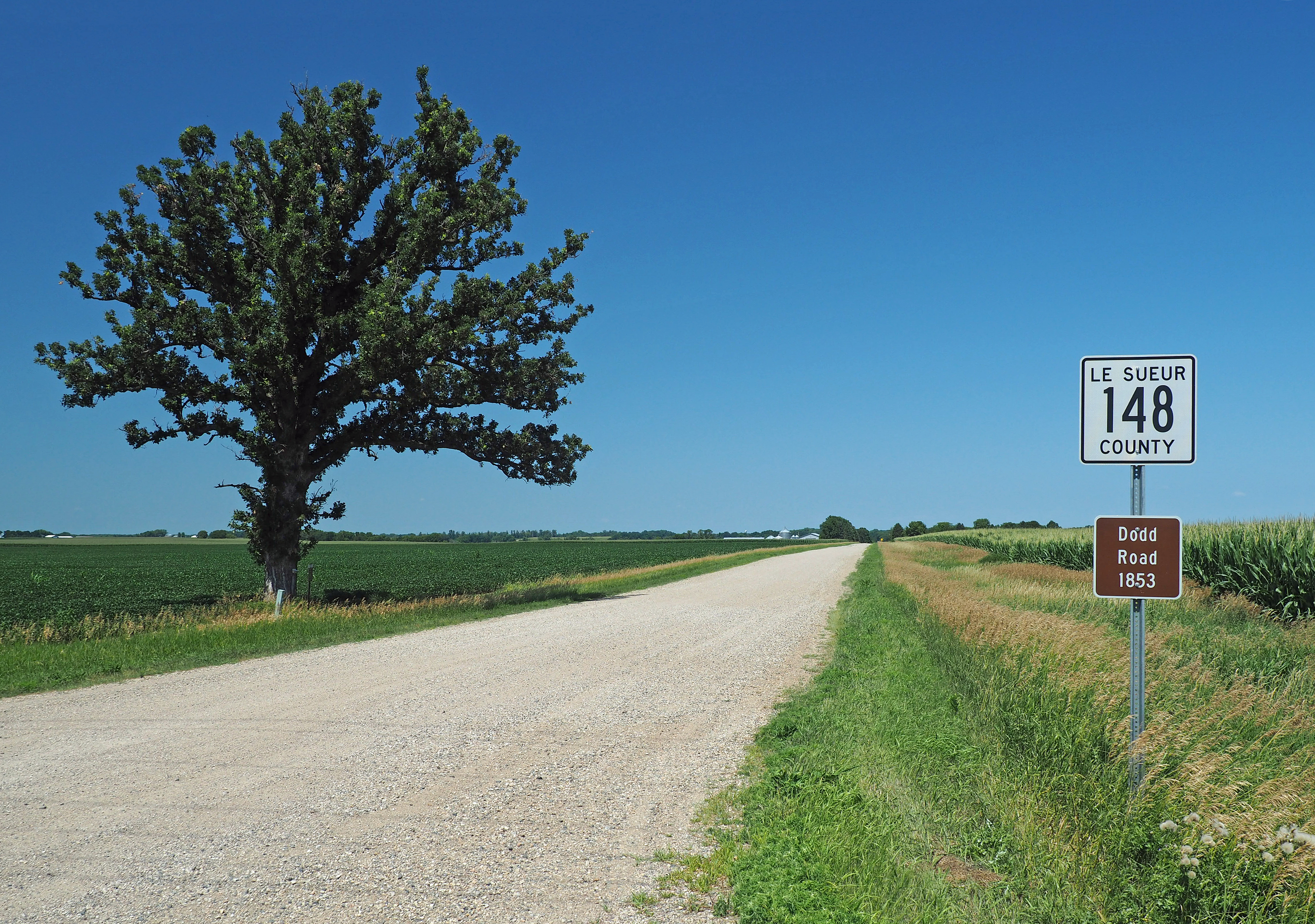
- The segment of Dodd Road near Cleveland, Minnesota

- Location within Minnesota
- Nearest city: Forest Township, Rice County, Minnesota
- Coordinates: 44.327548°N 93.629823°W
- Area: 104 acres (42 ha)
- Built: 1853
- Built by: William B. Dodd
- NRHP reference No.: 03000520
- Added to NRHP: June 12, 2003

Dodd Road Discontiguous District is a set of three road segments in Minnesota's Le Sueur and Rice counties, which were listed on the National Register of Historic Places in 2003. They preserve segments of Dodd Road, a private road built by William B. Dodd. It was a privately funded road built between Mendota and St. Peter in 1853, and was a key transportation artery in early south-central Minnesota.

Its builder, William B. Dodd, was the founder of the town of St. Peter, Minnesota, as well as a ferry boat operator, land speculator, and a militia captain. Dodd and the other founders of the town knew that steamboat service on the Minnesota River was intermittent, and they figured that a road connection to St. Paul would help their village to flourish. The road-building party started from Mendota in April 1853 and followed high ridges in the land, and reached St. Peter in 109 days. Dodd Road helped to open up territory to settlers immigrating to Minnesota. Dodd later went to New Ulm to help protect settlers in the Dakota War of 1862, and was killed in an ambush. Two years later, in 1864, the Minnesota Central Railroad was built from St. Paul to Faribault and points beyond, which lessened the significance of the road.

Historian Scott Anfinson saw William Dodd's grave in St. Peter, read the inscription of "Builder of the Dodd Road", and decided to research the history of the road. Much of the original route of Dodd Road has been paved and is still signed in West St. Paul, Mendota Heights, Rosemount, Apple Valley, and Lakeville. Three unpaved rural segments were found to have enough resemblance to their original 1853 appearance to merit listing on the National Register. In Le Sueur County, Minnesota, it includes two segments: County Road 148 west of Cleveland, and County Road 136 from MN 13 to Cordova. These are in the vicinities of Cleveland and Kilkenny. In Rice County, Minnesota, it includes former County Road 61 (Circle Lake Trail, Falls Trail, Garfield Avenue, and Groveland Trail) between Millersburg and Shieldsville. This is a 6.8-mile (10.9 km) segment.

The listing includes three contributing structures on 104 acres (42 ha).
