= Greenland, Minnesota =

Unincorporated community in Minnesota, US

- Unincorporated community
- Location within Minnesota Location within the United States
- Coordinates: 44°12′24″N 93°43′39″W
- Country: United States
- State: Minnesota
- County: Le Sueur
- Township: Elysian
- Elevation: 1,037 ft (316 m)
- Time zone: UTC-6 (Central (CST))
  - Summer (DST): UTC-5 (CDT)
- ZIP code: 56028
- Area code: 507
- GNIS feature ID: 654735

Greenland is an unincorporated community in Elysian Township, Le Sueur County, Minnesota, United States.

The community is located along 231st Avenue near its junction with Greenland Road. Highway 60 (MN 60) is nearby.

Greenland had a post office from 1883 to 1914, and a station on the former Chicago Great Western Railroad.

Nearby places include Elysian and Madison Lake.
