= Jamestown Township, Blue Earth County, Minnesota =

Township in Minnesota, United States

Jamestown Township
- Township
- Location within the state of Minnesota Jamestown Township (the United States)
- Coordinates: 44°13′13″N 93°49′40″W
- Country: United States
- State: Minnesota
- County: Blue Earth

Area
  - Total: 17.5 sq mi (45.4 km^{2})
  - Land: 15.3 sq mi (39.7 km^{2})
  - Water: 2.2 sq mi (5.7 km^{2})
- Elevation: 1,020 ft (310 m)

Population (2000)
  - Total: 628
  - Density: 41/sq mi (15.8/km^{2})
- Time zone: UTC-6 (Central (CST))
  - Summer (DST): UTC-5 (CDT)
- ZIP code: 56063
- Area code: 507
- FIPS code: 27-31688
- GNIS feature ID: 0664571

Jamestown Township is a township in Blue Earth County, Minnesota, United States. The population was 628 as of the 2000 census.

== History ==
Jamestown Township was organized in 1858, and named after Jamestown, Virginia.

== Geography ==
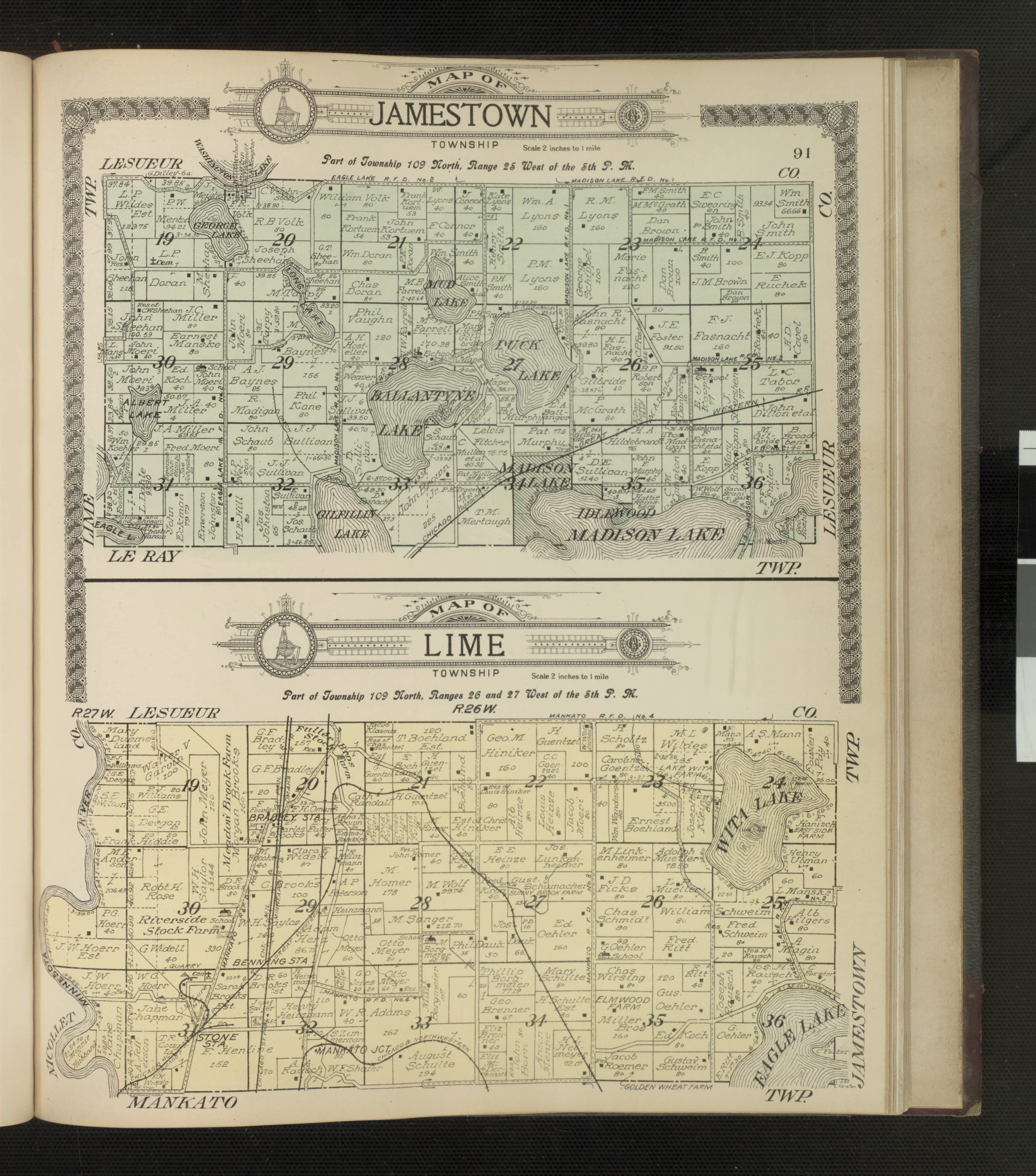
Jamestown and Lime Township Plat Maps from the Standard Atlas, Blue Earth County, Minnesota

According to the United States Census Bureau, the township has a total area of 17.5 square miles (45 km^{2}), of which 15.3 square miles (40 km^{2}) is land and 2.2 square miles (5.7 km^{2}) (12.54%) is water.

The vast majority of the city of Madison Lake is within the township geographically but is a separate entity.

=== Major highway ===
- Minnesota State Highway 60

=== Lakes ===
- Albert Lake
- Ballantyne Lake
- Duck Lake
- Eagle Lake (east edge)
- George Lake
- Gilfillin Lake (northeast three-quarters)
- Lake Washington
- Long Lake
- Madison Lake (northwest quarter)
- Mud Lake

=== Adjacent townships ===
- Washington Township, Le Sueur County (north)
- Elysian Township, Le Sueur County (east)
- Janesville Township, Waseca County (southeast)
- Le Ray Township (south)
- Mankato Township (southwest)
- Lime Township (west)
- Kasota Township, Le Sueur County (northwest)

=== Cemeteries ===
The township includes the following cemeteries: Calvary and Sugar Grove.

== Demographics ==
As of the census of 2000, there were 628 people, 231 households, and 182 families residing in the township. The population density was 40.9 inhabitants per square mile (15.8/km^{2}). There were 354 housing units at an average density of 23.1/sq mi (8.9/km^{2}). The racial makeup of the township was 99.68% White, and 0.32% from two or more races. Hispanic or Latino of any race were 0.64% of the population.

There were 231 households, out of which 34.2% had children under the age of 18 living with them, 72.7% were married couples living together, 3.0% had a female householder with no husband present, and 21.2% were non-families. 17.7% of all households were made up of individuals, and 6.1% had someone living alone who was 65 years of age or older. The average household size was 2.72 and the average family size was 3.09.

In the township the population was spread out, with 26.3% under the age of 18, 6.5% from 18 to 24, 25.3% from 25 to 44, 30.4% from 45 to 64, and 11.5% who were 65 years of age or older. The median age was 40 years. For every 100 females, there were 103.2 males. For every 100 females age 18 and over, there were 103.1 males.

The median income for a household in the township was $56,875, and the median income for a family was $62,188. Males had a median income of $36,071 versus $27,353 for females. The per capita income for the township was $26,014. About 2.8% of families and 3.6% of the population were below the poverty line, including 2.5% of those under age 18 and none of those age 65 or over.
