= Little Cannon River =

Little Cannon River may refer to:

- Little Cannon River (Sabre Lake)
- Little Cannon River (Cannon River)

== See also ==
- Cannon River (disambiguation)
