= Henderson Station, Minnesota =

Unincorporated community in Minnesota, US

Henderson Station, Minnesota East Henderson
- Unincorporated community
- Location within Minnesota Location within the United States
- Coordinates: 44°31′33″N 93°53′02″W
- Country: United States
- State: Minnesota
- County: Le Sueur
- Township: Tyrone
- Elevation: 745 ft (227 m)
- Time zone: UTC-6 (Central (CST))
  - Summer (DST): UTC-5 (CDT)
- ZIP code: 56044 and 56058
- Area code: 507
- GNIS feature ID: 644864

Henderson Station is an unincorporated community in Tyrone Township, Le Sueur County, Minnesota, United States. The community is also known as East Henderson. It is 1.3 miles (2.1 km) east of Henderson, and six miles north of Le Sueur.

The community is located along Henderson Station Road–Le Sueur County Road 34. Highway 19 (MN 19) and U.S. 169 are nearby.

The community of Henderson Station was originally established in the 1850s as Clarksville, located on the east side of the Minnesota River, opposite the city of Henderson in adjacent Sibley County. The community was organized in 1855, platted in 1877, incorporated in 1883, but has since returned to being an unincorporated community in section 7 within Tyrone Township.

Henderson Station had a ferry from 1856 to 1877, a general store, and a grain elevator, which closed in 1960.

It had a station on the former Chicago, St. Paul, Minneapolis and Omaha Railway in section 6 of Tyrone Township.

Ney Nature Center is nearby.

The Henderson Station Road was the setting for scenes in Purple Rain.
