= Cannon River =

Cannon River may refer to:

- Cannon River (Minnesota), United States, a tributary of Mississippi River
- Cannon River (Queensland), Australia, a tributary of the Langlo River

== See also ==
- Little Cannon River (disambiguation)
