= Lake Sanborn =

Lake in the state of Minnesota, United States

- Location within Minnesota
- Location: Le Sueur County, Minnesota
- Coordinates: 44°28′21″N 93°32′41″W
- Type: lake

Lake Sanborn is a lake in Le Sueur County, in the U.S. state of Minnesota.

Lake Sanborn was named for Edwin Sanborn, a pioneer who settled there in 1857.

== See also ==
- List of lakes in Minnesota
