= Dog Lake (Minnesota) =

Lake in the state of Minnesota, United States

- Location within Minnesota
- Location: North America
- Coordinates: 44.2906512°N 93.8505135°W
- Basin countries: United States
- Surface elevation: 1,017 ft (310 m)

Dog Lake is a lake in Le Sueur County, Minnesota
