= Sheas Lake =

Lake in the state of Minnesota, United States

- Location within Minnesota
- Location: Le Sueur County, Minnesota
- Coordinates: 44°28′15″N 93°43′13″W
- Type: lake

Sheas Lake is a lake in Le Sueur County, in the U.S. state of Minnesota.

Sheas Lake was named for Timothy Shea, a pioneer who settled there.
