= School Lake (Le Sueur County, Minnesota) =

Lake in the state of Minnesota, United States

- Location within Minnesota
- Location: Le Sueur County, Minnesota
- Coordinates: 44°27′58″N 93°39′45″W
- Type: lake

School Lake is a lake in Le Sueur County, in the U.S. state of Minnesota.

School Lake is so-called because it was located in school section 36.

== See also ==
- List of lakes in Minnesota
