= Greenleaf Lake (Le Sueur County, Minnesota) =

Lake in the state of Minnesota, United States

- Location within Minnesota
- Location: Le Sueur County, Minnesota
- Coordinates: 44°23′53″N 93°37′37″W
- Type: lake

Greenleaf Lake is a lake in Le Sueur County, in the U.S. state of Minnesota.

Greenleaf Lake was named for the greenery of the forest at the lake.

== See also ==
- List of lakes in Minnesota
