= Cleveland Township, Le Sueur County, Minnesota =

Township in Minnesota, United States

Cleveland Township
- Township
- Location within the state of Minnesota Cleveland Township (the United States)
- Coordinates: 44°18′43″N 93°49′42″W
- Country: United States
- State: Minnesota
- County: Le Sueur

Area
  - Total: 37.1 sq mi (96.2 km^{2})
  - Land: 33.4 sq mi (86.5 km^{2})
  - Water: 3.7 sq mi (9.7 km^{2})
- Elevation: 1,050 ft (320 m)

Population (2000)
  - Total: 615
  - Density: 18/sq mi (7.1/km^{2})
- Time zone: UTC-6 (Central (CST))
  - Summer (DST): UTC-5 (CDT)
- ZIP code: 56017
- Area code: 507
- FIPS code: 27-11890
- GNIS feature ID: 0663821

Cleveland Township is a township in Le Sueur County, Minnesota, United States. The population was 615 at the 2000 census.

== History ==
Cleveland Township was organized in 1858, and named after Cleveland, Ohio.

== Geography ==
According to the United States Census Bureau, the township has a total area of 37.2 square miles (96 km^{2}), of which 33.4 square miles (87 km^{2}) is land and 3.7 square miles (9.6 km^{2}) (10.07%) is water.

== Demographics ==
As of the census of 2000, there were 615 people, 218 households, and 173 families residing in the township. The population density was 18.4 inhabitants per square mile (7.1/km^{2}). There were 301 housing units at an average density of 9.0 per square mile (3.5/km^{2}). The racial makeup of the township was 96.10% White, 2.44% Asian, 0.33% from other races, and 1.14% from two or more races. Hispanic or Latino of any race were 0.49% of the population.

There were 218 households, out of which 34.9% had children under the age of 18 living with them, 71.1% were married couples living together, 4.6% had a female householder with no husband present, and 20.6% were non-families. 16.1% of all households were made up of individuals, and 6.0% had someone living alone who was 65 years of age or older. The average household size was 2.82 and the average family size was 3.14.

In the township the population was spread out, with 25.7% under the age of 18, 6.8% from 18 to 24, 26.0% from 25 to 44, 29.9% from 45 to 64, and 11.5% who were 65 years of age or older. The median age was 41 years. For every 100 females, there were 114.3 males. For every 100 females age 18 and over, there were 111.6 males.

The median income for a household in the township was $50,972, and the median income for a family was $51,250. Males had a median income of $31,900 versus $22,019 for females. The per capita income for the township was $21,314. About 0.6% of families and 1.6% of the population were below the poverty line, including none of those under the age of eighteen or sixty-five or over.
