= Sasse Lake =

Lake in the state of Minnesota, United States

- Location within Minnesota
- Location: Le Sueur County, Minnesota
- Coordinates: 44°15′32″N 93°41′34″W
- Type: lake

Sasse Lake is a lake in Le Sueur County, in the U.S. state of Minnesota.

Sasse Lake was named for William Frederick Sasse, pioneer settlers.
