= Savidge Lake =

Lake in the state of Minnesota, United States

- Location within Minnesota
- Location: Le Sueur County, Minnesota
- Coordinates: 44°19′36″N 93°52′0″W
- Type: lake

Savidge Lake is a lake in Le Sueur County, in the U.S. state of Minnesota.

Savidge Lake was named for a local settler.
