= Little Cannon River (Sabre Lake) =

River in Le Sueur County, Minnesota, United States

Little Cannon River (southcentral Minnesota)
- Location within Minnesota

Location
- Country: United States
- State: Minnesota
- County: Le Sueur County

Physical characteristics
- Source
  - location: Kilkenny
  - coordinates: 44.2838524°N 93.5371693°W
  - elevation: 1,025 feet (312 m)
- Mouth
  - location: Cordova
  - coordinates: 44.3085758°N 93.6266170°W
  - elevation: 1,013 feet (309 m)
- Length: 5.7-mile-long (9.2 km)

Basin features
- River system: Cannon River

The Little Cannon River is a small, 5.7-mile-long (9.2 km) river in Minnesota, United States. It is located in its entirety in Le Sueur County. It joins the Cannon River in Sabre Lake.

== See also ==
- List of rivers of Minnesota
