= Cordova, Minnesota =

Unincorporated community in Minnesota, United States

- Unincorporated community
- Location within Minnesota Location within the United States
- Coordinates: 44°20′11″N 93°40′18″W
- Country: United States
- State: Minnesota
- County: Le Sueur
- Township: Cordova
- Elevation: 1,050 ft (320 m)
- Time zone: UTC-6 (Central (CST))
  - Summer (DST): UTC-5 (CDT)
- ZIP code: 56057
- Area code: 507
- GNIS feature ID: 641495

Cordova is an unincorporated community in Cordova Township, Le Sueur County, Minnesota, United States.

The community is located along Le Sueur County Road 2, near its junction with Le Sueur County Road 5 at Gorman Lake.

County Roads 7 and 11 are also in the immediate area. The Little Cannon River is nearby.

Cordova had a post office from 1857 to 1907. It was platted on September 28, 1867, and incorporated on February 27, 1878, but has since returned to being an unincorporated community within Cordova Township.

Nearby places include Le Center, Waterville, Kilkenny, Montgomery, Lexington, Cleveland, and Elysian.

Historical population
| Census | Pop. | Note | %± |
|---|---|---|---|
| 1880 | 140 | | — |
U.S. Decennial Census
