= Cordova Township, Le Sueur County, Minnesota =

Township in Minnesota, United States

Cordova Township
- Township
- Location within the state of Minnesota Cordova Township (the United States)
- Coordinates: 44°18′57″N 93°42′45″W
- Country: United States
- State: Minnesota
- County: Le Sueur

Area
  - Total: 36.2 sq mi (93.8 km^{2})
  - Land: 34.7 sq mi (90.0 km^{2})
  - Water: 1.5 sq mi (3.8 km^{2})
- Elevation: 1,033 ft (315 m)

Population (2000)
  - Total: 517
  - Density: 15/sq mi (5.7/km^{2})
- Time zone: UTC-6 (Central (CST))
  - Summer (DST): UTC-5 (CDT)
- FIPS code: 27-13204
- GNIS feature ID: 0663869

Cordova Township is a township in Le Sueur County, Minnesota, United States. The population was 517 at the 2000 census.

The unincorporated community of Cordova is located within Cordova Township.

== History ==
Cordova Township was organized in 1858, and named, directly or indirectly after Cordova, in Spain.

== Geography ==
According to the United States Census Bureau, the township has a total area of 36.2 square miles (94 km^{2}), of which 34.7 square miles (90 km^{2}) is land and 1.5 square miles (3.9 km^{2}) (4.03%) is water.

== Demographics ==
As of the census of 2000, there were 517 people, 179 households, and 148 families residing in the township. The population density was 14.9 inhabitants per square mile (5.8/km^{2}). There were 228 housing units at an average density of 6.6 per square mile (2.5/km^{2}). The racial makeup of the township was 97.49% White, 0.19% Native American, 1.35% Asian, 0.97% from other races. Hispanic or Latino of any race were 1.35% of the population.

There were 179 households, out of which 36.3% had children under the age of 18 living with them, 73.2% were married couples living together, 2.8% had a female householder with no husband present, and 16.8% were non-families. 12.8% of all households were made up of individuals, and 6.1% had someone living alone who was 65 years of age or older. The average household size was 2.89 and the average family size was 3.16.

In the township the population was spread out, with 27.3% under the age of 18, 7.5% from 18 to 24, 27.7% from 25 to 44, 25.1% from 45 to 64, and 12.4% who were 65 years of age or older. The median age was 38 years. For every 100 females, there were 113.6 males. For every 100 females age 18 and over, there were 118.6 males.

The median income for a household in the township was $37,361, and the median income for a family was $46,094. Males had a median income of $28,750 versus $21,000 for females. The per capita income for the township was $15,964. About 6.0% of families and 5.5% of the population were below the poverty line, including 4.5% of those under age 18 and 7.2% of those age 65 or over.
