= Tyler Lake =

Lake in the state of Minnesota, United States

- Location within Minnesota
- Location: Le Sueur County, Minnesota
- Coordinates: 44°24′44″N 93°42′40″W
- Type: lake

Tyler Lake is a lake in Le Sueur County, in the U.S. state of Minnesota.

Tyler Lake was named after William L. Tyler, a pioneer who settled at the lake in 1858.
