= Lake Pepin (Le Sueur County, Minnesota) =

Lake in the state of Minnesota, United States

- Location within Minnesota
- Location: Le Sueur County, Minnesota
- Coordinates: 44°28′24″N 93°35′32″W
- Type: lake

Lake Pepin is a lake in Le Sueur County, in the U.S. state of Minnesota.

The lake took its name from Lake Pepin on the Mississippi River.

== See also ==
- List of lakes in Minnesota
