= Lake Henry (Le Sueur County, Minnesota) =

Lake in the state of Minnesota, United States

- Location within Minnesota
- Location: Le Sueur County, Minnesota
- Coordinates: 44°17′20″N 93°48′56″W
- Type: lake

Lake Henry is a lake in Le Sueur County, in the U.S. state of Minnesota. It covers 360 acres and has 3 miles of shoreline. The average depth is about 4 to 5 ft with a maximum depth of about 6.5 ft.

Lake Henry was named for a local settler.

== See also ==
- List of lakes in Minnesota
