= Lanesburgh Township, Le Sueur County, Minnesota =

Township in Minnesota, United States

Lanesburgh Township
- Township
- Location within the state of Minnesota Lanesburgh Township (the United States)
- Coordinates: 44°29′52″N 93°35′3″W
- Country: United States
- State: Minnesota
- County: Le Sueur

Area
  - Total: 34.4 sq mi (89.2 km^{2})
  - Land: 32.9 sq mi (85.3 km^{2})
  - Water: 1.5 sq mi (3.9 km^{2})
- Elevation: 1,050 ft (320 m)

Population (2000)
  - Total: 2,074
  - Density: 63/sq mi (24.3/km^{2})
- Time zone: UTC-6 (Central (CST))
  - Summer (DST): UTC-5 (CDT)
- FIPS code: 27-35468
- GNIS feature ID: 0664722

Lanesburgh Township is a township in Le Sueur County, Minnesota, United States. The population was 2,074 at the 2000 census.

Lanesburgh Township was named for Charles L. Lane, a pioneer settler.

== Geography ==
According to the United States Census Bureau, the township has a total area of 34.5 square miles (89 km^{2}), of which 32.9 square miles (85 km^{2}) is land and 1.5 square miles (3.9 km^{2}) (4.41%) is water.

== Demographics ==
As of the census of 2000, there were 2,074 people, 628 households, and 545 families residing in the township. The population density was 63.0 inhabitants per square mile (24.3/km^{2}). There were 637 housing units at an average density of 19.3 per square mile (7.5/km^{2}). The racial makeup of the township was 98.99% White, 0.05% African American, 0.05% Native American, 0.14% Asian, 0.29% from other races, and 0.48% from two or more races. Hispanic or Latino of any race were 0.58% of the population.

There were 628 households, out of which 53.0% had children under the age of 18 living with them, 81.5% were married couples living together, 3.3% had a female householder with no husband present, and 13.2% were non-families. 9.7% of all households were made up of individuals, and 4.0% had someone living alone who was 65 years of age or older. The average household size was 3.28 and the average family size was 3.52.

In the township the population was spread out, with 35.2% under the age of 18, 5.7% from 18 to 24, 34.6% from 25 to 44, 17.9% from 45 to 64, and 6.5% who were 65 years of age or older. The median age was 33 years. For every 100 females, there were 100.2 males. For every 100 females age 18 and over, there were 103.2 males.

The median income for a household in the township was $62,986, and the median income for a family was $65,083. Males had a median income of $39,769 versus $26,555 for females. The per capita income for the township was $20,782. About 2.7% of families and 3.4% of the population were below the poverty line, including 2.0% of those under age 18 and 14.2% of those age 65 or over.
