= Sleepy Eye Lake (Le Sueur County, Minnesota) =

Lake in the state of Minnesota, United States

- Location within Minnesota
- Location: Le Sueur County, Minnesota
- Coordinates: 44°20′0″N 93°42′12″W
- Type: lake

Sleepy Eye Lake is a lake in Le Sueur County, in the U.S. state of Minnesota.

Sleepy Eye Lake was named for Chief Sleepy Eye.

== See also ==
- List of lakes in Minnesota
