= Kasota Lake =

Lake in the state of Minnesota, United States

- Location within Minnesota
- Location: Kandiyohi County, Minnesota
- Coordinates: 45°4′39″N 94°53′44″W
- Type: lake

Kasota Lake is a lake in Kandiyohi County, in the U.S. state of Minnesota.

Kasota is a name derived from the Dakota language meaning "cleared place".

== See also ==
- List of lakes in Minnesota
