= Lake Emily (Portage County, Wisconsin) =

Lake in the state of Wisconsin, United States

- Location within Wisconsin Location within the United States
- Location: Portage County, Wisconsin
- Coordinates: 44°28′13″N 89°20′16″W
- Type: lake
- Etymology: Emily Cole
- Basin countries: United States
- Surface elevation: 1,089 ft (332 m)

Lake Emily is a lake in the U.S. state of Wisconsin.

A variant name is "Emily Lake". Lake Emily was named after Emily Cole, the wife of a pioneer settler.
