= Lake Volney =

Lake in the state of Minnesota, United States

- Location within Minnesota
- Location: Le Sueur County, Minnesota
- Coordinates: 44°22′6″N 93°38′28″W
- Type: lake

Lake Volney is a lake in Le Sueur County, in the U.S. state of Minnesota.

Lake Volney was named for Volney J. Brockway, an early settler.
