= Tyrone Township, Le Sueur County, Minnesota =

Township in Minnesota, United States

Tyrone Township
- Township
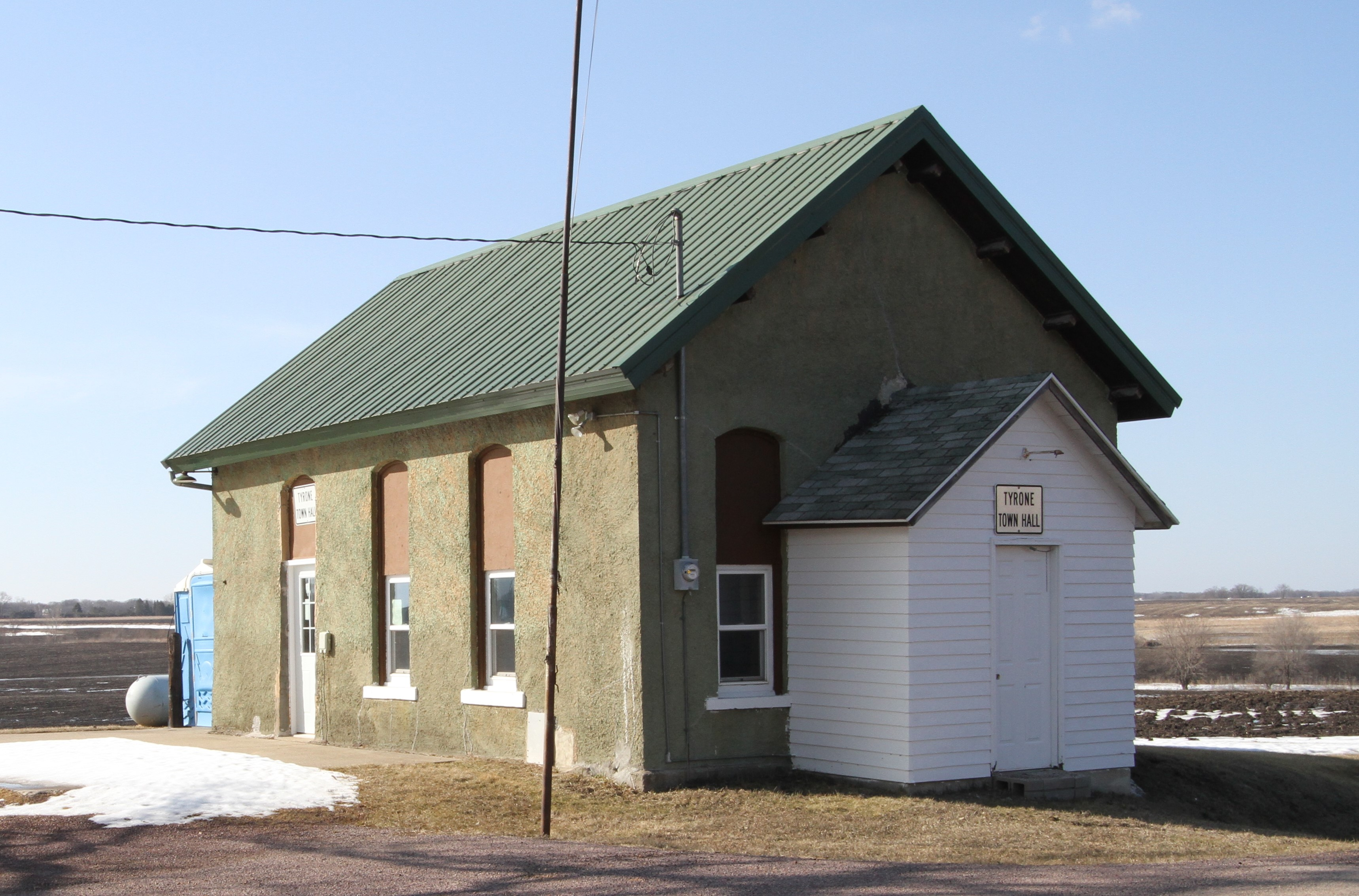
- Tyrone Township Hall

- Location within the state of Minnesota Tyrone Township (the United States)
- Coordinates: 44°29′38″N 93°50′30″W
- Country: United States
- State: Minnesota
- County: Le Sueur

Area
  - Total: 36.2 sq mi (93.7 km^{2})
  - Land: 36.1 sq mi (93.4 km^{2})
  - Water: 0.12 sq mi (0.3 km^{2})
- Elevation: 961 ft (293 m)

Population (2000)
  - Total: 564
  - Density: 16/sq mi (6/km^{2})
- Time zone: UTC-6 (Central (CST))
  - Summer (DST): UTC-5 (CDT)
- FIPS code: 27-66100
- GNIS feature ID: 0665833

Tyrone Township is a township in Le Sueur County, Minnesota, United States. The population was 564 for the 2000 census.

Organized in 1858, it was named after County Tyrone in Ireland.

== Geography ==
According to the United States Census Bureau, the township has a total area of 36.2 square miles (93.7 km^{2}), of which 36.1 square miles (93.4 km^{2}) is land and 0.1 square mile (0.3 km^{2}) (0.33%) is water.

== Demographics ==
As of the census of 2000, there were 564 people, 212 households, and 171 families residing in the township. The population density was 15.6 people per square mile (6.0/km^{2}). There were 215 housing units at an average density of 6.0/sq mi (2.3/km^{2}). The racial makeup of the township was 98.58% White, 0.35% African American, 0.18% from other races, and 0.89% from two or more races. Hispanic or Latino of any race were 1.42% of the population.

There were 212 households, out of which 32.5% had children under the age of 18 living with them, 77.4% were married couples living together, 2.8% had a female householder with no husband present, and 19.3% were non-families. 16.0% of all households were made up of individuals, and 4.2% had someone living alone who was 65 years of age or older. The average household size was 2.66 and the average family size was 2.99.

In the township the population was spread out, with 25.4% under the age of 18, 6.0% from 18 to 24, 26.6% from 25 to 44, 28.0% from 45 to 64, and 14.0% who were 65 years of age or older. The median age was 41 years. For every 100 females, there were 97.2 males. For every 100 females age 18 and over, there were 107.4 males.

The median income for a household in the township was $60,556, and the median income for a family was $63,750. Males had a median income of $42,917 versus $27,143 for females. The per capita income for the township was $22,470. About 2.3% of families and 4.7% of the population were below the poverty line, including 8.8% of those under age 18 and none of those age 65 or over.
