= Sharon Township, Le Sueur County, Minnesota =

Township in Minnesota, United States

Sharon Township
- Township
- Location within the state of Minnesota Sharon Township (the United States)
- Coordinates: 44°24′57″N 93°50′22″W
- Country: United States
- State: Minnesota
- County: Le Sueur

Area
  - Total: 35.9 sq mi (92.9 km^{2})
  - Land: 35.8 sq mi (92.6 km^{2})
  - Water: 0.15 sq mi (0.4 km^{2})
- Elevation: 991 ft (302 m)

Population (2000)
  - Total: 658
  - Density: 18/sq mi (7.1/km^{2})
- Time zone: UTC-6 (Central (CST))
  - Summer (DST): UTC-5 (CDT)
- FIPS code: 27-59386
- GNIS feature ID: 0665584

Sharon Township is a township in Le Sueur County, Minnesota, United States. The population was 658 at the 2000 census.

Sharon Township was organized in 1858, and named for the Sharon plain, in present-day Israel.

== Geography ==
According to the United States Census Bureau, the township has a total area of 35.9 square miles (92.9 km^{2}), of which 35.8 square miles (92.6 km^{2}) is land and 0.1 square mile (0.4 km^{2}) (0.39%) is water.

== Demographics ==
As of the census of 2000, there were 658 people, 231 households, and 195 families residing in the township. The population density was 18.4 people per square mile (7.1/km^{2}). There were 239 housing units at an average density of 6.7/sq mi (2.6/km^{2}). The racial makeup of the township was 97.42% White, 1.37% Native American, 0.15% Asian, and 1.06% from two or more races. Hispanic or Latino of any race were 0.30% of the population.

There were 231 households, out of which 38.5% had children under the age of 18 living with them, 78.4% were married couples living together, 3.9% had a female householder with no husband present, and 15.2% were non-families. 13.4% of all households were made up of individuals, and 4.8% had someone living alone who was 65 years of age or older. The average household size was 2.85 and the average family size was 3.10.

In the township the population was spread out, with 30.5% under the age of 18, 4.9% from 18 to 24, 28.1% from 25 to 44, 25.7% from 45 to 64, and 10.8% who were 65 years of age or older. The median age was 38 years. For every 100 females, there were 106.3 males. For every 100 females age 18 and over, there were 107.7 males.

The median income for a household in the township was $52,841, and the median income for a family was $57,083. Males had a median income of $32,375 versus $24,688 for females. The per capita income for the township was $21,314. About 3.4% of families and 6.6% of the population were below the poverty line, including 12.6% of those under age 18 and none of those age 65 or over.
