= Lake Emily (Le Sueur County, Minnesota) =

Lake in the state of Minnesota, United States

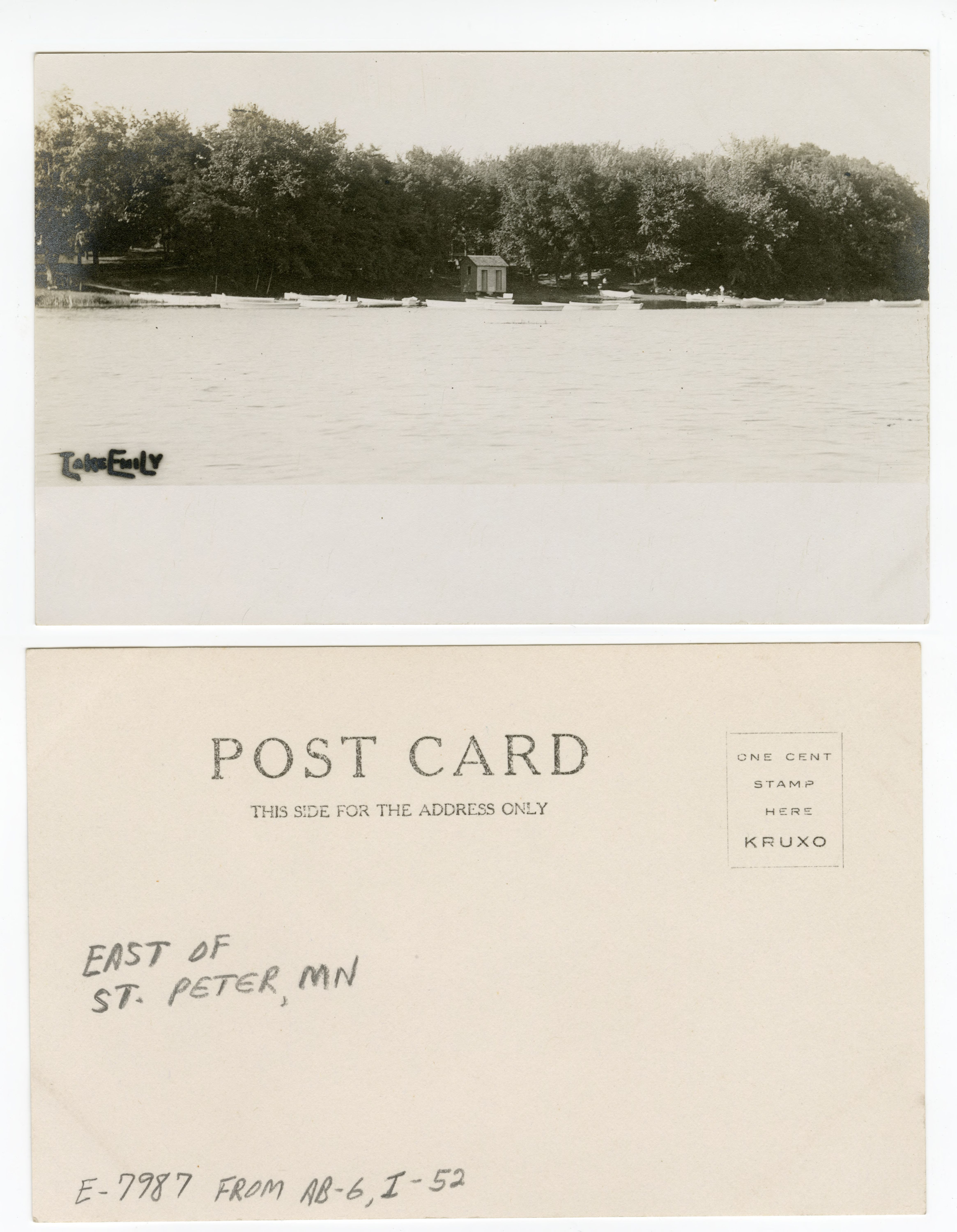

- Location within Minnesota
- Location: Le Sueur County, Minnesota
- Coordinates: 44.3094°N 93.9200°W
- Basin countries: United States
- Surface area: 235 acres (0.95 km^{2})
- Max. depth: 11 ft (3.4 m)
- Surface elevation: 971 ft (296 m)
- Islands: 2
- Settlements: 0

Lake Emily is a lake in Le Sueur County, Minnesota, United States.
