= Heidelberg, Minnesota =

City in Minnesota, United States

- City
- Location of Heidelberg, Minnesota
- Coordinates: 44°30′01″N 93°37′42″W
- Country: United States
- State: Minnesota
- County: Le Sueur
- Platted: December 4, 1878
- Incorporated: June 26, 1894

Government
  - Mayor: Lori Weldon

Area
  - Total: 0.524 sq mi (1.356 km^{2})
  - Land: 0.524 sq mi (1.356 km^{2})
  - Water: 0 sq mi (0.000 km^{2})
- Elevation: 1,053 ft (321 m)

Population (2020)
  - Total: 137
  - Estimate (2022): 132
  - Density: 261.6/sq mi (101.01/km^{2})
- Time zone: UTC−6 (Central (CST))
  - Summer (DST): UTC−5 (CDT)
- ZIP Code: 56071
- Area code: 952
- FIPS code: 27-28214
- GNIS feature ID: 2394346
- Sales tax: 7.375%
- Website: cityofheidelbergmn.com

Heidelberg is a city in Le Sueur County, Minnesota, United States. The population was 137 at the 2020 census.

== Geography ==
According to the United States Census Bureau, the city has a total area of 0.524 square miles (1.36 km^{2}), all land.

County Highway 28 serves as a main route in the community. Minnesota State Highway 13 passes nearby.

== History ==
Heidelberg was platted on December 4, 1878, and named by its original German settlers (Frank Heil and Frederick Ihrig) after Heidelberg, in Germany. A post office operated in the community from 1872 until 1903. Heidelberg was incorporated on June 26, 1894.

== Demographics ==
Historical population
Census	Pop.	Note	%±
1900	114		—
1910	111		−2.6%
1920	73		−34.2%
1930	56		−23.3%
1940	71		26.8%
1950	61		−14.1%
1960	44		−27.9%
1970	72		63.6%
1980	102		41.7%
1990	73		−28.4%
2000	72		−1.4%
2010	122		69.4%
2020	137		12.3%
2022 (est.)	132		−3.6%
U.S. Decennial Census; 2020 Census

The median income for a household in the city as of 2009 was $69,686. The per capita income for the city was $25,398. None of the population or the families were below the poverty line.

=== 2010 census ===
As of the 2010 census, there were 122 people, 41 households, and 34 families residing in the city. The population density was 230.2 inhabitants per square mile (88.9/km^{2}). There were 47 housing units at an average density of 88.7 per square mile (34.2/km^{2}). The racial makeup of the city was 100.0% White. Hispanic or Latino of any race were 1.6% of the population.

There were 41 households, of which 51.2% had children under the age of 18 living with them, 75.6% were married couples living together, 4.9% had a female householder with no husband present, 2.4% had a male householder with no wife present, and 17.1% were non-families. 12.2% of all households were made up of individuals, and 4.9% had someone living alone who was 65 years of age or older. The average household size was 2.98 and the average family size was 3.32.

The median age in the city was 40.3 years. 33.6% of residents were under the age of 18; 2.4% were between the ages of 18 and 24; 27.9% were from 25 to 44; 25.4% were from 45 to 64; and 10.7% were 65 years of age or older. The gender makeup of the city was 55.7% male and 44.3% female.
