= Elysian Township, Le Sueur County, Minnesota =

Township in Minnesota, United States

Elysian Township
- Township
- Location within the state of Minnesota Elysian Township (the United States)
- Coordinates: 44°14′48″N 93°41′53″W
- Country: United States
- State: Minnesota
- County: Le Sueur

Area
  - Total: 35.3 sq mi (91.5 km^{2})
  - Land: 30.3 sq mi (78.5 km^{2})
  - Water: 5.0 sq mi (13.0 km^{2})
- Elevation: 1,024 ft (312 m)

Population (2000)
  - Total: 985
  - Density: 32/sq mi (12.5/km^{2})
- Time zone: UTC-6 (Central (CST))
  - Summer (DST): UTC-5 (CDT)
- ZIP code: 56028
- Area code: 507
- FIPS code: 27-19178
- GNIS feature ID: 0664092

Elysian Township is a township in Le Sueur County, Minnesota, United States. The population was 985 at the 2000 census.

Elysian Township was organized in 1858, and named after Elysian.

== Geography ==
According to the United States Census Bureau, the township has a total area of 35.3 square miles (91 km^{2}), of which 30.3 square miles (78 km^{2}) is land and 5.0 square miles (13 km^{2}) (14.23%) is water.

== Demographics ==
As of the census of 2000, there were 985 people, 387 households, and 289 families residing in the township. The population density was 32.5 inhabitants per square mile (12.5/km^{2}). There were 726 housing units at an average density of 24.0 per square mile (9.3/km^{2}). The racial makeup of the township was 99.09% White, 0.41% Native American, 0.10% Asian, and 0.41% from two or more races. Hispanic or Latino of any race were 0.61% of the population.

There were 387 households, out of which 27.6% had children under the age of 18 living with them, 69.8% were married couples living together, 2.3% had a female householder with no husband present, and 25.3% were non-families. 19.9% of all households were made up of individuals, and 5.9% had someone living alone who was 65 years of age or older. The average household size was 2.55 and the average family size was 2.92.

In the township the population was spread out, with 23.2% under the age of 18, 6.6% from 18 to 24, 26.3% from 25 to 44, 30.5% from 45 to 64, and 13.4% who were 65 years of age or older. The median age was 42 years. For every 100 females, there were 110.5 males. For every 100 females age 18 and over, there were 116.6 males.

The median income for a household in the township was $51,176, and the median income for a family was $55,938. Males had a median income of $35,375 versus $24,038 for females. The per capita income for the township was $22,265. About 2.9% of families and 3.8% of the population were below the poverty line, including none of those under age 18 and 10.3% of those age 65 or over.
