= Washington Township, Le Sueur County, Minnesota =

Township in Minnesota, United States

Washington Township
- Township
- Location within the state of Minnesota Washington Township (the United States)
- Coordinates: 44°15′46″N 93°51′3″W
- Country: United States
- State: Minnesota
- County: Le Sueur

Area
  - Total: 15.3 sq mi (39.5 km^{2})
  - Land: 12.0 sq mi (31.2 km^{2})
  - Water: 3.2 sq mi (8.3 km^{2})
- Elevation: 1,060 ft (323 m)

Population (2000)
  - Total: 797
  - Density: 66/sq mi (25.6/km^{2})
- Time zone: UTC-6 (Central (CST))
  - Summer (DST): UTC-5 (CDT)
- FIPS code: 27-68350
- GNIS feature ID: 0665923

Washington Township is a township in Le Sueur County, Minnesota, United States. The population was 797 at the 2000 census.

Washington Township was organized in 1858, taking its name from Lake Washington.

== Geography ==
According to the United States Census Bureau, the township has a total area of 15.2 square miles (39.5 km^{2}), of which 12.0 square miles (31.2 km^{2}) is land and 3.2 square miles (8.3 km^{2}) (21.05%) is water.

== Demographics ==
As of the census of 2000, there were 797 people, 324 households, and 238 families residing in the township. The population density was 66.2 inhabitants per square mile (25.6/km^{2}). There were 482 housing units at an average density of 40.1 per square mile (15.5/km^{2}). The racial makeup of the township was 98.75% White, 0.13% African American, 0.50% Asian, 0.25% from other races, and 0.38% from two or more races. Hispanic or Latino of any race were 0.13% of the population.

There were 324 households, out of which 28.7% had children under the age of 18 living with them, 69.8% were married couples living together, 0.9% had a female householder with no husband present, and 26.5% were non-families. 22.5% of all households were made up of individuals, and 7.1% had someone living alone who was 65 years of age or older. The average household size was 2.46 and the average family size was 2.89.

In the township the population was spread out, with 23.1% under the age of 18, 4.9% from 18 to 24, 24.2% from 25 to 44, 34.0% from 45 to 64, and 13.8% who were 65 years of age or older. The median age was 44 years. For every 100 females, there were 101.8 males. For every 100 females age 18 and over, there were 112.8 males.

The median income for a household in the township was $69,188, and the median income for a family was $76,146. Males had a median income of $42,692 versus $26,458 for females. The per capita income for the township was $37,717. None of the families and 0.9% of the population were living below the poverty line, including no under eighteens and none of those over 64.
