= Kasota, Minnesota =

City in Minnesota, United States

- City
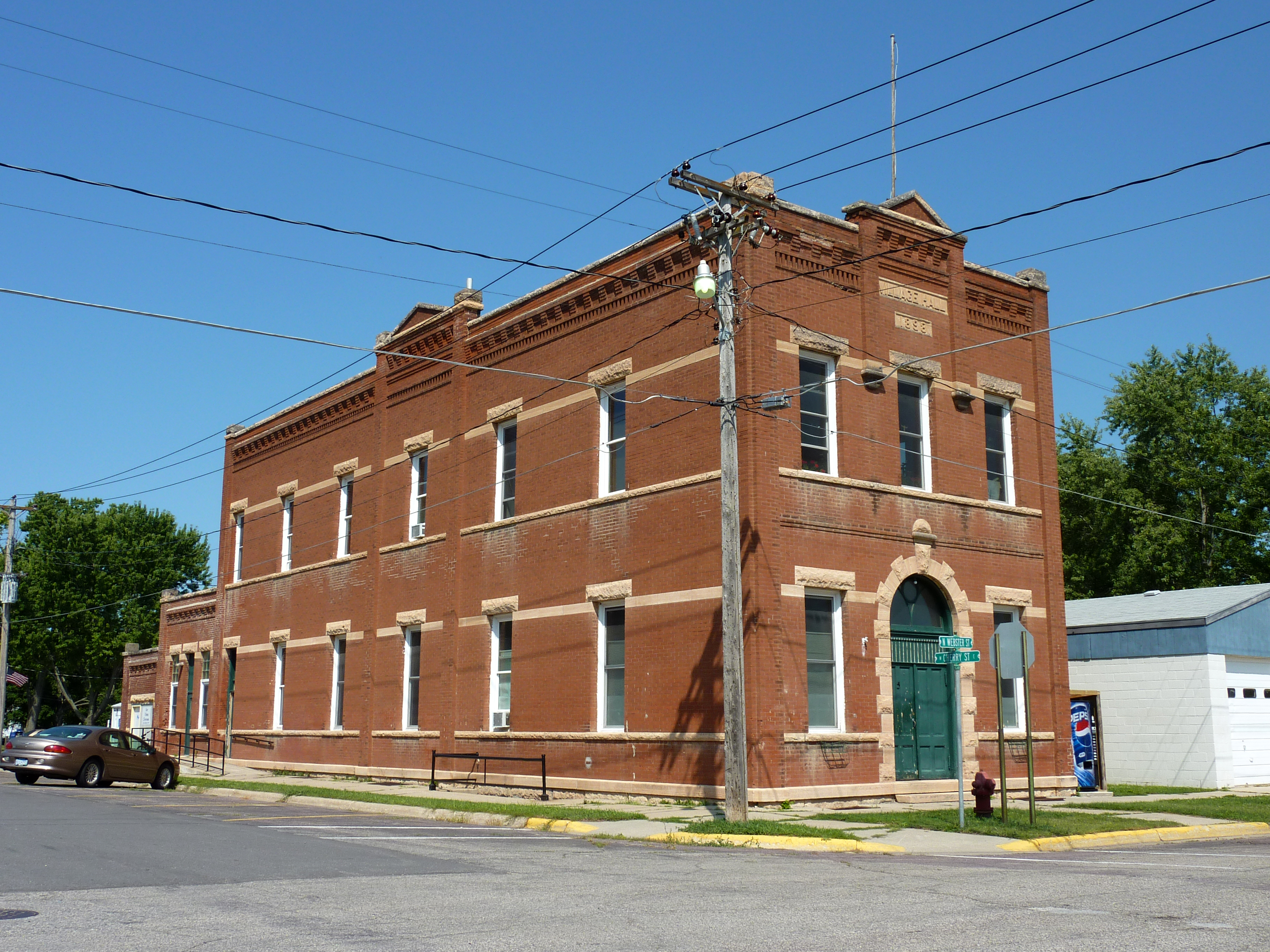
- Kasota Village Hall is on the National Register of Historic Places

- Location of Kasota, Minnesota
- Coordinates: 44°17′30″N 93°58′07″W
- Country: United States
- State: Minnesota
- County: Le Sueur

Government
  - Type: Mayor - Council
  - Mayor: Betty Ingalls

Area
  - Total: 1.28 sq mi (3.32 km^{2})
  - Land: 1.24 sq mi (3.22 km^{2})
  - Water: 0.039 sq mi (0.10 km^{2})
- Elevation: 801 ft (244 m)

Population (2020)
  - Total: 714
  - Density: 574.7/sq mi (221.91/km^{2})
- Time zone: UTC-6 (Central (CST))
  - Summer (DST): UTC-5 (CDT)
- ZIP code: 56050
- Area code: 507
- FIPS code: 27-32462
- GNIS feature ID: 2395494
- Website: kasotamn.govoffice2.com

Kasota is a city within the larger Kasota Township, Le Sueur County, Minnesota, United States. The population was 714 at the 2020 census.

== Geography ==
Kasota is about halfway between Mankato and St. Peter on the eastern side of the Minnesota River. According to the United States Census Bureau, the city has an area of 1.00 square mile (2.59 km^{2}), all land. The city center is about two miles north of the Kasota Prairie, designated as a Scientific and Natural Area by the state Department of Natural Resources.

Minnesota State Highway 22 serves as a main route in the community. U.S. Route 169 is nearby, on the western side of the Minnesota River.

== History ==
Kasota was platted in 1855. "Kasota" is a name derived from the Dakota language word for "cleared off".

On July 1, 1892, the Sontag Brothers, John Sontag and George Contant, and their partner in crime, Chris Evans, tried to rob a train between St. Peter and Kasota along the Minnesota River. The bandits acquired nothing of value, but their activities came under the review of Pinkerton detectives, and both were apprehended in June 1893.

=== The stone industry ===
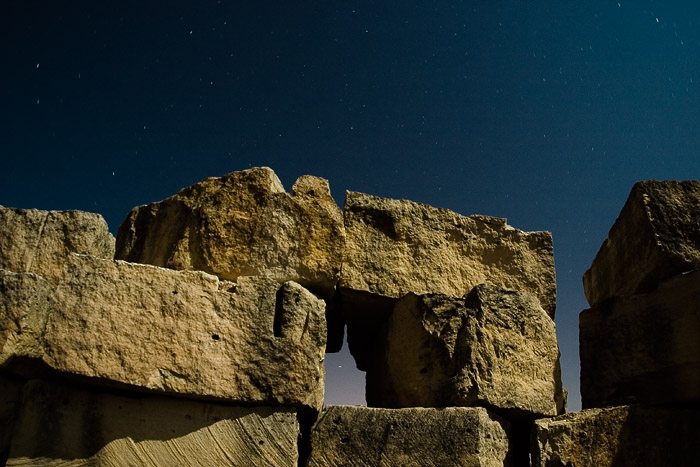
Kasota limestone

During the 1880s, the stone industry experienced an unexpected boom. During this time, C.W. Babcock took over his father's stone business. He began applying modern quarrying methods, and in 1889 formed a partnership with Tyrrell Swan Willcox, an immigrant from Rugby, England, who was instrumental in promoting the use of polished Kasota limestone for interior and exterior residential use. Much of the industry's boom was caused by the railroads' expansion westward, which required large quantities of stone for trestles and culverts.

Babcock also was the first to begin quarrying Kasota limestone in and around the city of Kasota. The Babcock Company was the chief stone company during the city's early history, and the relationship between the company and the city was often contentions. At one point, the Babcock Company decided to blast within the city limits. This led to the creation of the park on County Road 21 in the town center, after the company was forced to fill in the quarry near the homes of city residents.

In the early 1980s, the Babcock Company went bankrupt. The Vetter Stone Company bought the Babcock quarries, further expanding the business, which now operates just outside the Mankato city limits. The Vetters were former employees of the Babcock Company who left to start their own company in the 1950s. The former Babcock Company plant in Kasota is now occupied by Door Engineering, which manufactures industrial doors. Much of the former Kasota quarry is occupied by Unimin Corporation, which mines silica sand for hydraulic fracturing ("fracking").

Kasota stone was selected as the primary stone for building the National Museum of the American Indian and the Eiteljorg Museum of American Indians and Western Art in Indianapolis.

=== Namesakes ===
Kasota (Dakota for "a cleared place") was the name of a wooden Great Lakes iron ore steamer, built in 1884. The Kasota sank after colliding with the passenger steamer The City of Detroit on the Detroit River on July 18, 1890. The Kasota was salvaged and rebuilt in 1892 but sank again after springing a leak during a storm off Grand Marais, Michigan, on September 19, 1903.

The USS Kasota was a naval tugboat, launched in 1944 and struck from the Navy list in 1961. It is believed that the Kasota (also known as the "Mighty Deuces") was the last wooden hull tug in the Navy at the time.

== Demographics ==
Historical population
Census	Pop.	Note	%±
1880	156		—
1890	655		319.9%
1900	764		16.6%
1910	700		−8.4%
1920	686		−2.0%
1930	593		−13.6%
1940	604		1.9%
1950	600		−0.7%
1960	649		8.2%
1970	732		12.8%
1980	739		1.0%
1990	655		−11.4%
2000	680		3.8%
2010	675		−0.7%
2020	714		5.8%
U.S. Decennial Census; 2020 Census

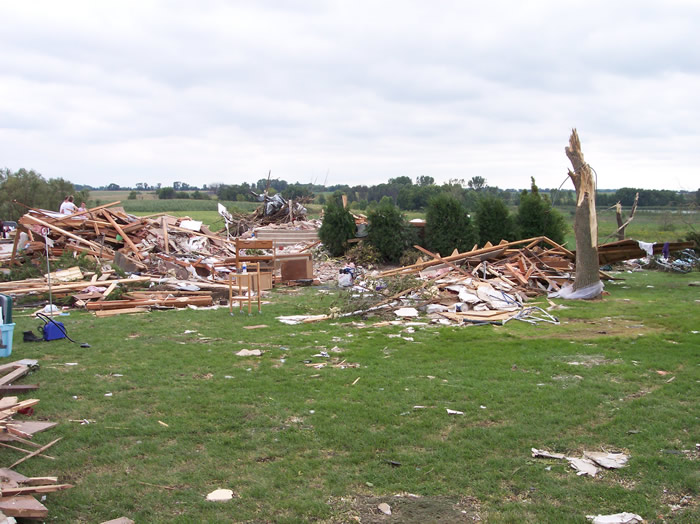
Damage from the 2006 Dakota–Minnesota tornado outbreak in Kasota

=== 2010 census ===
As of the census of 2010, there were 675 people, 293 households, and 175 families residing in the city. The population density was 675.0 inhabitants per square mile (260.6/km^{2}). There were 305 housing units at an average density of 305.0 per square mile (117.8/km^{2}). The racial makeup of the city was 94.7% White, 1.2% African American, 0.6% Native American, 0.7% Asian, 0.9% from other races, and 1.9% from two or more races. Hispanic or Latino of any race were 2.2% of the population.

There were 293 households, of which 29.0% had children under the age of 18 living with them, 43.0% were married couples living together, 10.6% had a female householder with no husband present, 6.1% had a male householder with no wife present, and 40.3% were non-families. 31.7% of all households were made up of individuals, and 7.2% had someone living alone who was 65 years of age or older. The average household size was 2.30 and the average family size was 2.84.

The median age in the city was 36.9 years. 21.8% of residents were under the age of 18; 7.9% were between the ages of 18 and 24; 29% were from 25 to 44; 30.6% were from 45 to 64; and 10.8% were 65 years of age or older. The gender makeup of the city was 49.2% male and 50.8% female.

=== 2000 census ===
As of the census of 2000, there were 680 people, 275 households, and 196 families residing in the city. The population density was 673.4 inhabitants per square mile (260.0/km^{2}). There were 279 housing units at an average density of 276.3 per square mile (106.7/km^{2}). The racial makeup of the city was 95.59% White, 0.74% African American, 2.06% Native American, 0.15% Asian, 0.15% from other races, and 1.32% from two or more races. Hispanic or Latino of any race were 0.88% of the population.

There were 275 households, out of which 34.2% had children under the age of 18 living with them, 49.5% were married couples living together, 15.3% had a female householder with no husband present, and 28.4% were non-families. 21.1% of all households were made up of individuals, and 8.4% had someone living alone who was 65 years of age or older. The average household size was 2.46 and the average family size was 2.81.

In the city, the population was spread out, with 26.2% under the age of 18, 9.0% from 18 to 24, 27.9% from 25 to 44, 27.4% from 45 to 64, and 9.6% who were 65 years of age or older. The median age was 36 years. For every 100 females, there were 101.8 males. For every 100 females age 18 and over, there were 94.6 males.

The median income for a household in the city was $39,097, and the median income for a family was $43,750. Males had a median income of $30,300 versus $21,711 for females. The per capita income for the city was $17,503. About 6.6% of families and 7.8% of the population were below the poverty line, including 10.6% of those under age 18 and 16.9% of those age 65 or over.

== Gallery ==
Post Office

Community Center and Fire Department

Former bank building

1889 Town Hall
