= Le Sueur County, Minnesota =

County in Minnesota, United States

- County
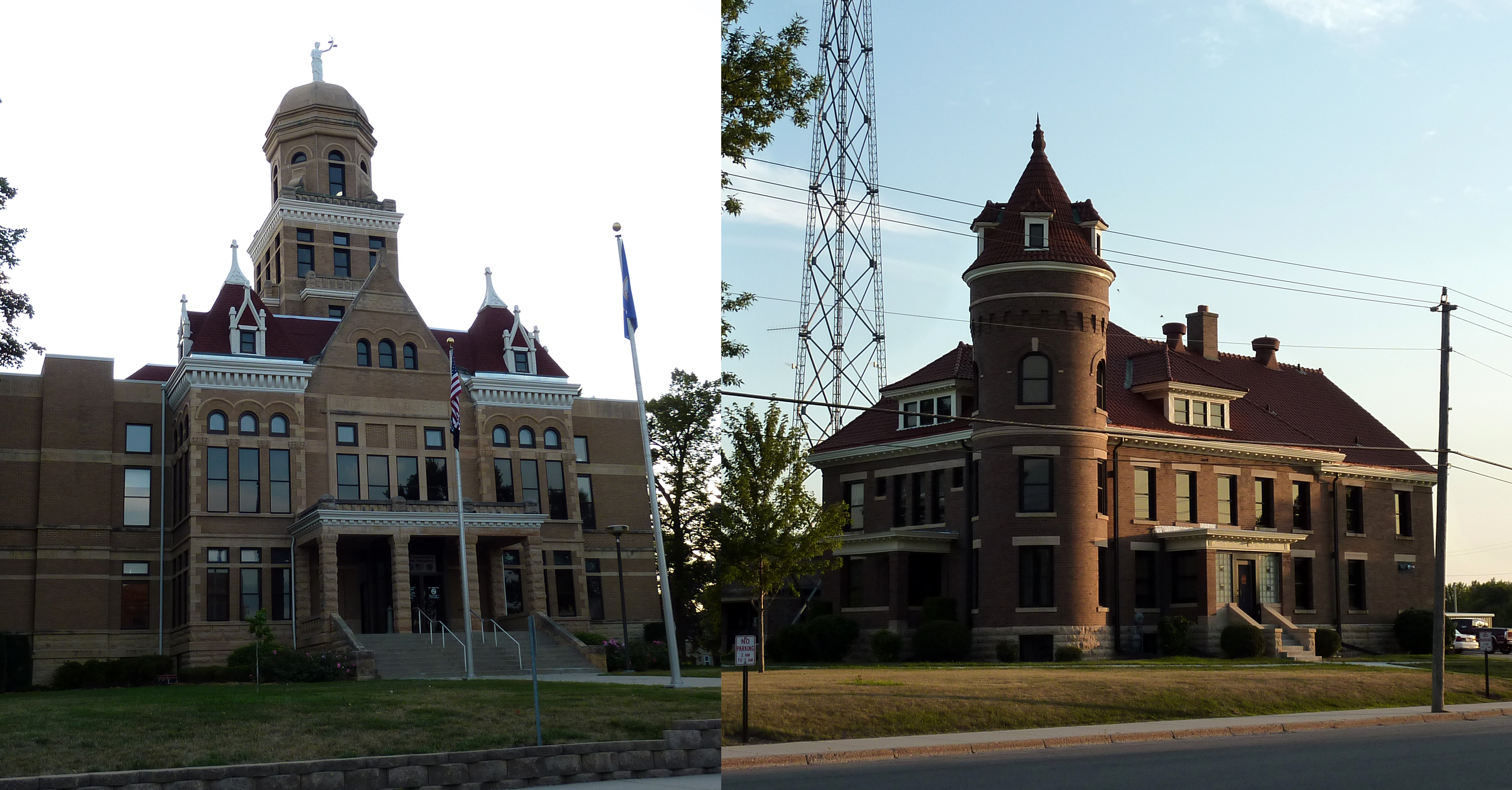
- Le Sueur County Courthouse and Jail

- Location within the U.S. state of Minnesota
- Coordinates: 44°22′N 93°44′W
- Country: United States
- State: Minnesota
- Founded: March 5, 1853
- Named for: Pierre-Charles Le Sueur
- Seat: Le Center
- Largest city: Le Sueur

Area
  - Total: 474 sq mi (1,230 km^{2})
  - Land: 449 sq mi (1,160 km^{2})
  - Water: 25 sq mi (65 km^{2}) 5.3%

Population (2020)
  - Total: 28,674
  - Estimate (2025): 29,453 ▲
  - Density: 63.9/sq mi (24.7/km^{2})
- Time zone: UTC−6 (Central)
  - Summer (DST): UTC−5 (CDT)
- Congressional district: 2nd
- Website: www.lesueurcounty.gov

Le Sueur County (/ləsʊər/ lə-SOOR) is a county located in the south central portion of the U.S. state of Minnesota. As of the 2020 census, the population was 28,674. Its county seat is Le Center.

Le Sueur County is part of the Minneapolis-St. Paul-Bloomington, MN-WI Metropolitan Statistical Area.

== History ==
The Minnesota Territory legislature established several counties in 1853. This county was created on March 5 of that year. It was named for French explorer Pierre-Charles Le Sueur, who visited the area in 1700.

The settlement of Le Sueur (actually two competing settlements, Le Sueur and Le Sueur City) had sprung up on the east bank of the Minnesota River, both being platted in 1852. The legislature named the combined area as the first county seat. However, its remoteness from most of the county meant hardship for most of the area's residents since the county was covered with dense hardwood forest and existing roads were impassable when wet.

Several efforts were made to acquire a more central location. In the early 1870s, Cleveland (established in 1857, inland from the river in the SW part of the county) held a referendum to become the county seat. The referendum passed, but was challenged due to voting irregularities. In 1875 another referendum made Cleveland the county seat (1875-1876). In 1876, another referendum approved moving the seat to the newly created town of Le Sueur Center; the seat was promptly moved there. In the 1870s, businessmen from Waterville gained ownership of a quarter-section of land near the county's center, cleared the timber, and platted the city of Le Sueur Center (1876). The seat was moved there after a county referendum approved it. The county seat has remained in Le Sueur Center (renamed Le Center in 1930) since 1876.

The first railroad entered the county in 1867. This began the era of greater access and mobility. The first purpose-built courthouse in Le Sueur Center was constructed in 1896–7. It has been extensively remodeled and enlarged two times since.

Soils of Le Sueur County

== Geography ==
The Minnesota River flows northeastward along the west border of Le Sueur County, on its way to discharge into the Mississippi. The terrain consists of low rolling hills, dotted with lakes and ponds. The soil is rich and black. The terrain slopes to the north and east, with its highest point near the midpoint of its east border, at 1,145 ft (349 m) ASL. The county has an area of 474 square miles (1,230 km^{2}), of which 449 square miles (1,160 km^{2}) is land and 25 square miles (65 km^{2}) (5.3%) is water. Le Sueur is one of seven Minnesota savanna region counties where no forest soils exist and one of 17 counties where savanna soils dominate.

Soils of Sakatah Lake State Park area

=== Lakes ===
The following lakes are partially or completely within Le Sueur County:

- Borer Lake
- Bossuot Lake
- Clear Lake
- Decker Lake
- Diamond Lake
- Dietz Lake
- Dog Lake
- Dora Lake
- Eggert Lake
- Ely Lake
- Emily Lake
- Fish Lake
- German Lake
- Goldsmith Lake
- Goose Lake (Cordova Township)
- Goose Lake (Waterville Township)
- Gorman Lake
- Greenleaf Lake
- Harkridge Lake
- Horseshoe Lake (part)
- Huoy Lake
- Lake Emily
- Lake Francis
- Lake Henry
- Lake Jefferson
- Lake Mabel
- Lake Pepin
- Lake Sanborn
- Lake Tustin
- Lake Volney
- Lake Washington
- Mareks Lake
- Mary Lake
- Mud Lake (Cordova Township)
- Mud Lake (Lanesburgh Township)
- Mud Lake (Lexington Township)
- North Goldsmith Lake
- Perch Lake
- Rays Lake
- Rice Lake
- Roemhildts Lake
- Round Lake
- Sabre Lake
- Sakatah Lake (part)
- Sanborn Lake
- Sasse Lake
- Savidge Lake
- School Lake
- Scotch Lake
- Shanghai Lake
- Sheas Lake
- Silver Lake (Cleveland Township)
- Silver Lake (Elysian Township)
- Sleepy Eye Lake
- Steele Lake
- Sunfish Lake
- Tetonka Lake (headwaters of Cannon River)
- Thomas Lake
- Tyler Lake

=== Protected areas ===
The following protected areas are within Le Sueur County:

- Bardel State Wildlife Management Area
- Chadderdon State Wildlife Management Area
- Chamberlain Woods Scientific and Natural Area
- Diamond Lake State Wildlife Management Area
- Minnesota Valley National Wildlife Refuge (part)
- Ottawa State Wildlife Management Area
- Paddy Marsh State Wildlife Management Area
- Saint Thomas State Wildlife Management Area
- Sakatah Lake State Park (part)
- Seven Mile Creek State Park (part)
- Shanghai State Wildlife Area
- Sheas Lake State Wildlife Area

=== Major highways ===
- US Highway 169
- Minnesota State Highway 13
- Minnesota State Highway 19
- Minnesota State Highway 21
- Minnesota State Highway 22
- Minnesota State Highway 60
- Minnesota State Highway 93
- Minnesota State Highway 99
- List of county roads

=== Adjacent counties ===
- Scott County - north
- Rice County - east
- Waseca County - south
- Blue Earth County - southwest
- Nicollet County - west
- Sibley County - northwest

== Demographics ==
Historical population
Census	Pop.	Note	%±
1860	5,318		—
1870	11,607		118.3%
1880	16,303		40.5%
1890	19,057		16.9%
1900	20,234		6.2%
1910	18,609		−8.0%
1920	17,870		−4.0%
1930	17,990		0.7%
1940	19,227		6.9%
1950	19,088		−0.7%
1960	19,906		4.3%
1970	21,331		7.2%
1980	23,434		9.9%
1990	23,929		2.1%
2000	25,426		6.3%
2010	27,703		9.0%
2020	28,674		3.5%
2025 (est.)	29,453	▲	2.7%
U.S. Decennial Census; 1790-1960 1900-1990; 1990-2000 2010-2020

=== Racial and ethnic composition ===
Le Sueur County, Minnesota – Racial and ethnic composition Note: the US Census treats Hispanic/Latino as an ethnic category. This table excludes Latinos from the racial categories and assigns them to a separate category. Hispanics/Latinos may be of any race.
Race / Ethnicity (NH = Non-Hispanic)	Pop 1980	Pop 1990	Pop 2000	Pop 2010	Pop 2020	% 1980	% 1990	% 2000	% 2010	% 2020
White alone (NH)	23,236	22,987	24,097	25,691	25,463	99.16%	98.92%	94.77%	92.74%	88.80%
Black or African American alone (NH)	6	13	38	88	262	0.03%	0.06%	0.15%	0.32%	0.91%
Native American or Alaska Native alone (NH)	34	50	65	72	67	0.15%	0.22%	0.26%	0.26%	0.23%
Asian alone (NH)	61	62	76	159	134	0.26%	0.27%	0.30%	0.57%	0.47%
Native Hawaiian or Pacific Islander alone (NH)	x	x	10	5	20	x	x	0.04%	0.02%	0.07%
Other race alone (NH)	11	4	3	17	58	0.05%	0.02%	0.01%	0.06%	0.20%
Mixed race or Multiracial (NH)	x	x	140	227	798	x	x	0.55%	0.82%	2.78%
Hispanic or Latino (any race)	86	123	997	1,444	1,872	0.37%	0.53%	3.92%	5.21%	6.53%
Total	23,434	23,239	25,426	27,703	28,674	100.00%	100.00%	100.00%	100.00%	100.00%

=== 2020 census ===
As of the 2020 census, the county had a population of 28,674. The median age was 41.5 years. 23.8% of residents were under the age of 18 and 18.2% of residents were 65 years of age or older. For every 100 females there were 103.3 males, and for every 100 females age 18 and over there were 102.6 males age 18 and over.

The racial makeup of the county was 90.6% White, 0.9% Black or African American, 0.4% American Indian and Alaska Native, 0.5% Asian, 0.1% Native Hawaiian and Pacific Islander, 2.4% from some other race, and 5.1% from two or more races. Hispanic or Latino residents of any race comprised 6.5% of the population.

14.2% of residents lived in urban areas, while 85.8% lived in rural areas.

There were 11,287 households in the county, of which 30.2% had children under the age of 18 living in them. Of all households, 55.9% were married-couple households, 17.6% were households with a male householder and no spouse or partner present, and 18.5% were households with a female householder and no spouse or partner present. About 25.0% of all households were made up of individuals and 11.0% had someone living alone who was 65 years of age or older.

There were 12,811 housing units, of which 11.9% were vacant. Among occupied housing units, 81.9% were owner-occupied and 18.1% were renter-occupied. The homeowner vacancy rate was 1.2% and the rental vacancy rate was 8.3%.

=== 2000 census ===
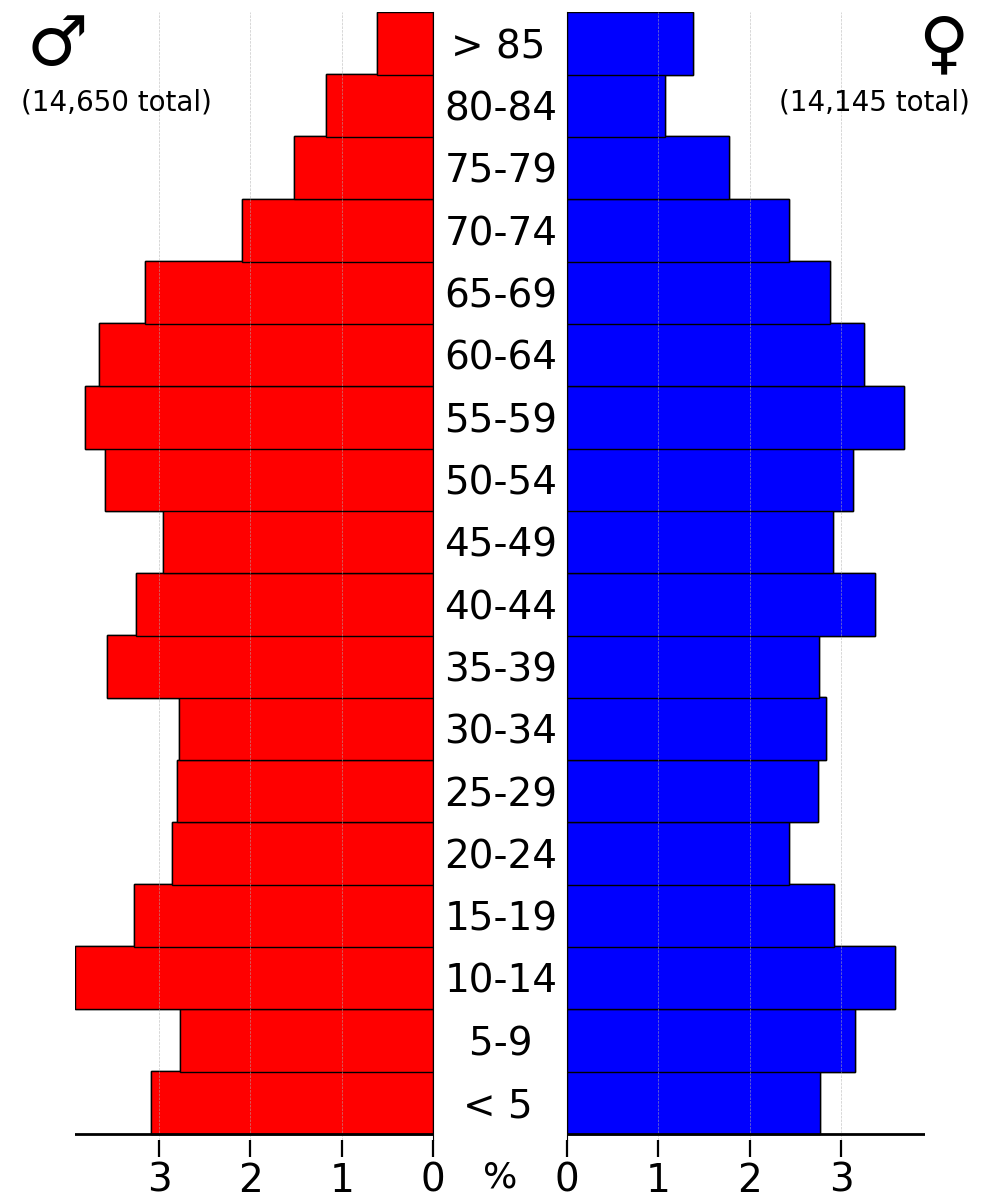
2022 US Census population pyramid for Le Sueur County, from ACS 5-year estimates

As of the census of 2000, the county had 25,426 people, 9,630 households, and 6,923 families. The population density was 56.6 per square mile (21.9/km^{2}). There were 10,858 housing units at an average density of 24.2 per square mile (9.3/km^{2}). The county's racial makeup was 96.56% White, 0.15% Black or African American, 0.26% Native American, 0.30% Asian, 0.04% Pacific Islander, 2.02% from other races, and 0.67% from two or more races. 3.92% of the population were Hispanic or Latino of any race. 44.9% were of German, 9.0% Czech, 9.0% Norwegian and 8.2% Irish ancestry. 94.0% spoke English, 3.5% Spanish and 1.7% Czech as their first language.

There were 9,630 households, of which 34.40% had children under the age of 18 living with them, 61.40% were married couples living together, 6.80% had a female householder with no husband present, and 28.10% were non-families. 23.70% of all households were made up of individuals, and 10.90% had someone living alone who was 65 years of age or older. The average household size was 2.61 and the average family size was 3.10.

27.40% of the county's population was under age 18, 7.50% was from age 18 to 24, 27.80% was from age 25 to 44, 23.20% was from age 45 to 64, and 14.10% were age 65 or older. The median age was 37 years. For every 100 females there were 100.30 males. For every 100 females age 18 and over, there were 99.70 males.

The country's median household income was $45,933, and the median family income was $53,000. Males had a median income of $34,196 versus $24,214 for females. The county's per capita income was $20,151. About 4.80% of families and 6.90% of the population were below the poverty line, including 7.50% of those under age 18 and 10.40% of those age 65 or over.

== Communities ==
=== Cities ===
- Cleveland
- Elysian (partial)
- Heidelberg
- Kasota
- Le Center (county seat)
- Le Sueur (partial)
- Kilkenny
- Mankato (partial)
- Montgomery
- New Prague (partial)
- Waterville

=== Unincorporated communities ===
- Cordova
- Greenland
- Henderson Station
- Lexington
- Marysburg (partial)
- Ottawa
- St. Henry
- St. Thomas
- Union Hill (partial)

=== Former communities ===
- Okaman

=== Townships ===
- Cleveland Township
- Cordova Township
- Derrynane Township
- Elysian Township
- Kasota Township
- Kilkenny Township
- Lanesburgh Township
- Lexington Township
- Montgomery Township
- Ottawa Township
- Sharon Township
- Tyrone Township
- Washington Township
- Waterville Township

== Politics ==
Le Sueur County residents usually vote Republican. The last Democrat to win an absolute majority in the county was Jimmy Carter in 1976, although Bill Clinton did carry the county by narrow pluralities in 1992 and 1996 due to high third-party performance. Democratic candidate Michael Dukakis also came close to flipping the county in 1988, only losing it by 5 votes. In 2020, Donald Trump performed better than any Republican in the county since Warren G. Harding in 1920, and he broke this record again in 2024, receiving 66% of the county's vote in the latter election.

United States presidential election results for Le Sueur County, Minnesota
Year	Republican		Democratic		Third party(ies)	
Year	No.	%	No.	%	No.	%
1892	1,465	39.73%	1,821	49.39%	401	10.88%
1896	2,235	51.16%	2,003	45.85%	131	3.00%
1900	1,941	49.02%	1,858	46.92%	161	4.07%
1904	2,086	59.19%	1,251	35.50%	187	5.31%
1908	1,819	47.86%	1,699	44.70%	283	7.45%
1912	886	24.93%	1,488	41.87%	1,180	33.20%
1916	1,430	43.89%	1,723	52.89%	105	3.22%
1920	4,059	66.22%	1,853	30.23%	218	3.56%
1924	2,475	38.19%	1,199	18.50%	2,807	43.31%
1928	3,401	42.23%	4,615	57.30%	38	0.47%
1932	2,121	26.19%	5,878	72.57%	101	1.25%
1936	2,849	32.14%	5,077	57.27%	939	10.59%
1940	5,543	59.52%	3,750	40.27%	20	0.21%
1944	4,560	57.24%	3,358	42.15%	49	0.62%
1948	3,858	43.70%	4,890	55.39%	80	0.91%
1952	5,776	63.19%	3,348	36.63%	16	0.18%
1956	5,026	58.45%	3,556	41.35%	17	0.20%
1960	4,426	45.77%	5,234	54.13%	10	0.10%
1964	3,191	34.22%	6,117	65.60%	17	0.18%
1968	4,189	43.72%	5,094	53.17%	298	3.11%
1972	5,388	52.50%	4,725	46.04%	149	1.45%
1976	4,565	40.11%	6,556	57.60%	260	2.28%
1980	5,478	47.12%	5,161	44.40%	986	8.48%
1984	6,033	54.10%	5,070	45.47%	48	0.43%
1988	5,415	49.57%	5,410	49.52%	100	0.92%
1992	3,858	32.27%	4,662	39.00%	3,434	28.73%
1996	3,902	34.81%	5,457	48.68%	1,850	16.50%
2000	6,138	49.78%	5,361	43.48%	832	6.75%
2004	7,746	53.70%	6,466	44.83%	212	1.47%
2008	7,636	50.88%	6,994	46.60%	379	2.53%
2012	7,715	52.15%	6,753	45.64%	327	2.21%
2016	9,182	61.33%	4,623	30.88%	1,166	7.79%
2020	10,775	64.07%	5,672	33.73%	371	2.21%
2024	11,503	65.85%	5,636	32.26%	330	1.89%

== See also ==
- National Register of Historic Places listings in Le Sueur County, Minnesota
