= Kasota Township, Le Sueur County, Minnesota =

Township in Minnesota, United States

Kasota Township
- Township
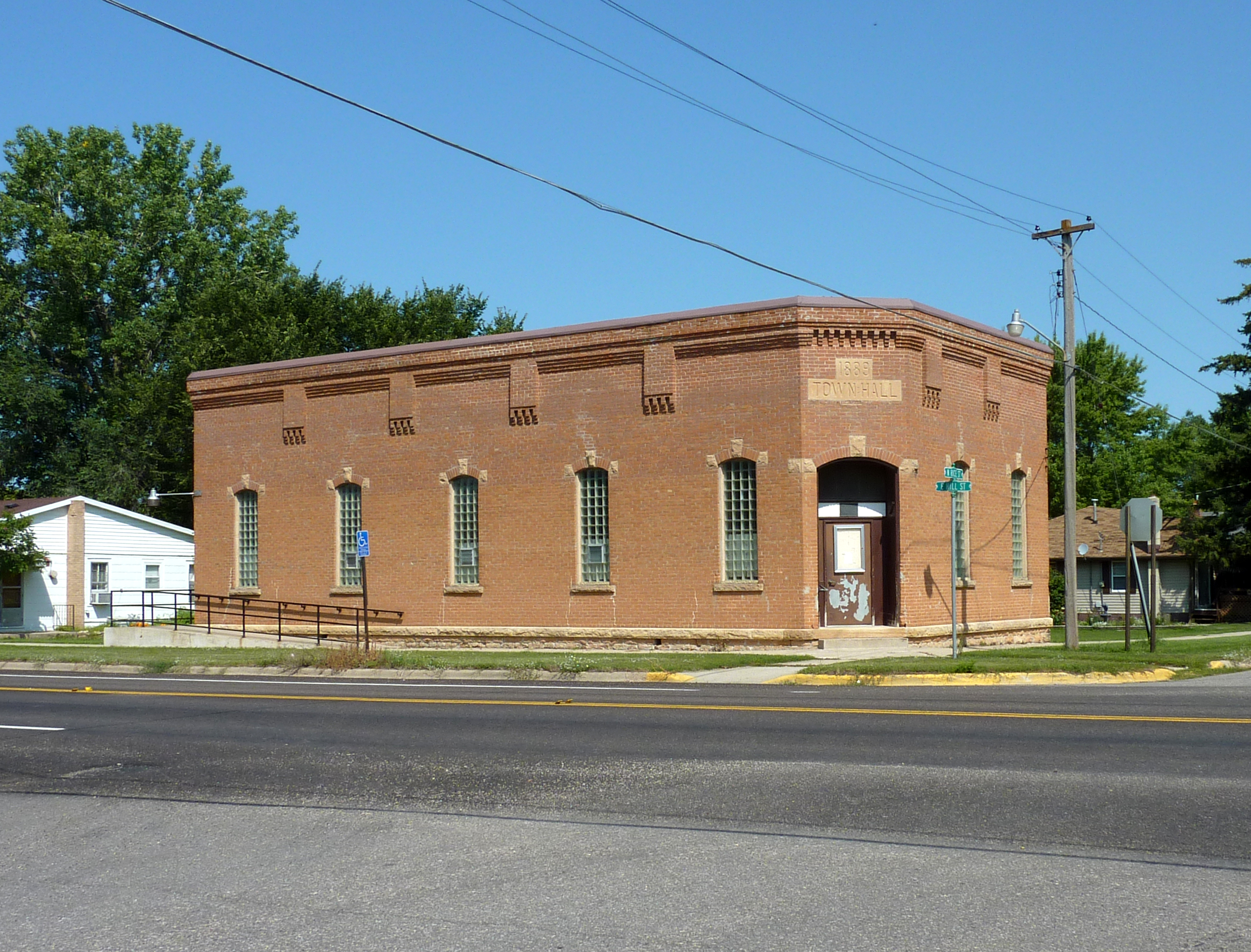
- Town hall

- Location within the state of Minnesota Kasota Township (the United States)
- Coordinates: 44°17′35″N 93°56′31″W
- Country: United States
- State: Minnesota
- County: Le Sueur

Area
  - Total: 39.2 sq mi (101.6 km^{2})
  - Land: 37.6 sq mi (97.3 km^{2})
  - Water: 1.7 sq mi (4.3 km^{2})
- Elevation: 906 ft (276 m)

Population (2000)
  - Total: 1,487
  - Density: 40/sq mi (15.3/km^{2})
- Time zone: UTC-6 (Central (CST))
  - Summer (DST): UTC-5 (CDT)
- ZIP code: 56050
- Area code: 507
- FIPS code: 27-32480
- GNIS feature ID: 0664601

Kasota Township is a township in Le Sueur County, Minnesota, United States. The population was 1,487 at the 2000 census.

Kasota Township was organized in 1858.

== Geography ==
According to the United States Census Bureau, the township has an area of 39.2 square miles (102 km^{2}), of which 37.6 square miles (97 km^{2}) is land and 1.7 square miles (4.4 km^{2}) (4.23%) is water.

== Demographics ==
As of the census of 2000, the township had 1,487 people, 563 households, and 449 families. The population density was 39.6 inhabitants per square mile (15.3/km^{2}). There were 642 housing units at an average density of 17.1/sq mi (6.6/km^{2}). The township's racial makeup was 99.26% White, 0.20% Asian, 0.07% from other races, and 0.47% from two or more races. Hispanic or Latino of any race were 1.01% of the population.

There were 563 households, of which 32.1% had children under the age of 18 living with them, 72.8% were married couples living together, 3.7% had a female householder with no husband present, and 20.2% were non-families. 16.9% of all households were made up of individuals, and 5.2% had someone living alone who was 65 years of age or older. The average household size was 2.64 and the average family size was 2.96.

24.3% of the township's population was under age 18, 7.2% was from age 18 to 24, 28.0% was from age 25 to 44, 30.3% was from age 45 to 64, and 10.2% was age 65 or older. The median age was 40 years. For every 100 females, there were 111.5 males. For every 100 females age 18 and over, there were 114.1 males.

The township's median household income was $57,650, and the median family income was $61,154. Males had a median income of $37,500 versus $23,952 for females. The township's per capita income was $25,575. About 3.6% of families and 5.4% of the population were below the poverty line, including 6.0% of those under age 18 and 4.6% of those age 65 or over.
