= Cleveland, Minnesota =

City in Minnesota, United States

- City
- Motto: "Friendly People, Our Greatest Asset"
- Location of Cleveland, Minnesota
- Coordinates: 44°19′25″N 93°50′07″W
- Country: United States
- State: Minnesota
- County: Le Sueur
- Established: 1854

Government
  - Type: Mayor - Council
  - Mayor: Don McCabe

Area
  - Total: 0.55 sq mi (1.42 km^{2})
  - Land: 0.55 sq mi (1.42 km^{2})
  - Water: 0 sq mi (0.00 km^{2})
- Elevation: 1,043 ft (318 m)

Population (2020)
  - Total: 747
  - Density: 1,364.7/sq mi (526.91/km^{2})
- Time zone: UTC-6 (Central (CST))
  - Summer (DST): UTC-5 (CDT)
- ZIP code: 56017
- Area code: 507
- FIPS code: 27-11872
- GNIS feature ID: 2393560
- Website: www.clevelandmn.govoffice2.com

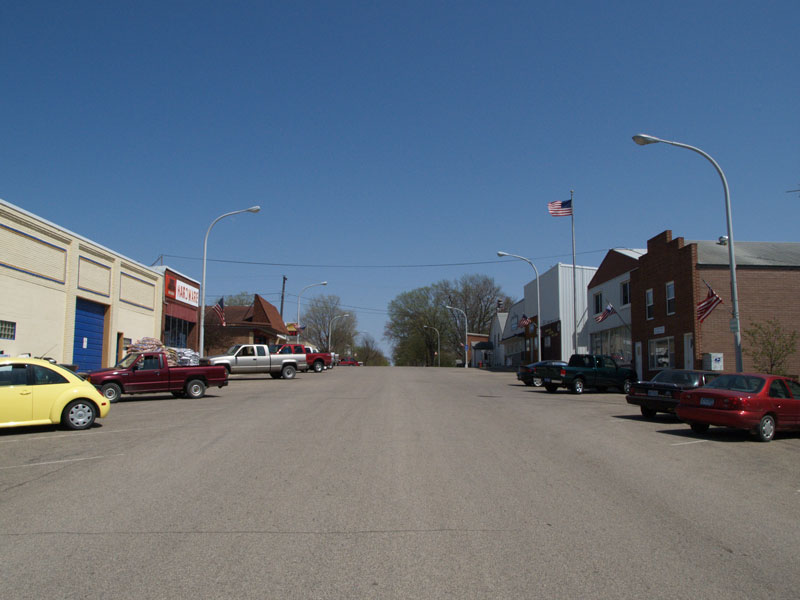
Downtown Cleveland, Minnesota

Cleveland is a city in Le Sueur County, Minnesota, United States. The population was 719 at the 2010 census and 747 at the 2020 census.

== History ==
Cleveland was established as a village in 1854, and incorporated as a city in 1904. The community was named after Cleveland, Ohio.

Under its original founders, Cleveland was a temperance town and thus voted no licensing of saloons in the town.

In 1859, Cleveland and nearby Le Sueur began a heated rivalry over the role of the Le Sueur county seat. The rivalry continued with only minor bloodshed until 1875, when a group of Cleveland citizens organized a militia to take the county seat by force. The militia retrieved the county seat from Le Sueur. After more than year of holding the county seat, Le Center agreed to take the seat where remains today.

== Geography ==
According to the United States Census Bureau, the city has a total area of 0.60 square miles (1.55 km^{2}), all land.

== Demographics ==
Historical population
Census	Pop.	Note	%±
1880	156		—
1890	132		−15.4%
1910	212		—
1920	269		26.9%
1930	290		7.8%
1940	313		7.9%
1950	325		3.8%
1960	389		19.7%
1970	492		26.5%
1980	699		42.1%
1990	699		0.0%
2000	673		−3.7%
2010	719		6.8%
2020	747		3.9%
U.S. Decennial Census 2020

=== 2020 Census ===
As of the Census of 2020, the city had 747 people, 273 households, and 177 families. The population density was 1,358.18 inhabitants per square mile (524.40/km^{2}). There were 295 housing units at an average density of 536.36 per square mile (207.09/km^{2}). The city's racial makeup was 91.83% White, 0.40% African American, 0.13% Native American, 0.80% Asian, 2.14% from other races, and 4.68% from two or more races. Hispanic or Latino of any race were 3.61% of the population.

There were 273 households, of which 38.8% had children under the age of 18 living with them, 59.0% were married couples living together, 25.3% had a female householder with no husband present, 9.2% had a male householder with no wife present and 29.4% were non-families. 38.7% of all households were made up of individuals, and 7.7% had someone living alone who was 65 years of age or older. The average household size was 2.92 and the average family size was 3.47.

32.5% of the city's population was under age 18, 8.9% was from age 18 to 24, 35.3% was from age 15 to 44, and 14.6% was age 65 or older. The median age was 32.3 years. For every 100 females, there were 96.8 males.

The city's median household income was $68,125, and the median family income was $80,313. About 4.9% of the population were below the poverty line, including 8.9% of those under age 18 and 1.7% of those age 65 or over.

=== 2010 census ===
As of the census of 2010, the city had 719 people, 278 households, and 205 families. The population density was 1,198.3 inhabitants per square mile (462.7/km^{2}). There were 298 housing units at an average density of 496.7 per square mile (191.8/km^{2}). The city's racial makeup was 98.7% White, 0.1% Asian, 1.0% from other races, and 0.1% from two or more races. Hispanic or Latino of any race were 1.5% of the population.

There were 278 households, of which 37.4% had children under the age of 18 living with them, 56.1% were married couples living together, 11.9% had a female householder with no husband present, 5.8% had a male householder with no wife present, and 26.3% were non-families. 20.9% of all households were made up of individuals, and 8.3% had someone living alone who was 65 years of age or older. The average household size was 2.59 and the average family size was 2.95.

The city's median age was 39.7 years. 27.5% of the city's population was under age 18; 6.3% was from age 18 to 24; 24.9% was from age 25 to 44; 29.7% was from age 45 to 64; and 11.4% was age 65 or older. The city's gender makeup was 49.9% male and 50.1% female.

=== 2000 census ===
As of the census of 2000, the city had 673 people, 252 households, and 177 families. The population density was 1,125.6 inhabitants per square mile (434.6/km^{2}). There were 259 housing units at an average density of 433.2 per square mile (167.3/km^{2}). The city's racial makeup was 98.96% White, 0.15% African American, 0.30% Native American, 0.15% Asian, 0.30% from other races, and 0.15% from two or more races. Hispanic or Latino of any race were 1.63% of the population.

There were 252 households, of which 39.7% had children under the age of 18 living with them, 59.9% were married couples living together, 9.1% had a female householder with no husband present, and 29.4% were non-families. 25.0% of all households were made up of individuals, and 11.1% had someone living alone who was 65 years of age or older. The average household size was 2.67 and the average family size was 3.25.

29.9% of the city's population was under age 18, 7.3% was from age 18 to 24, 27.2% was from age 25 to 44, 23.9% was from age 45 to 64, and 11.7% was age 65 or older. The median age was 36 years. For every 100 females, there were 97.9 males. For every 100 females age 18 and over, there were 95.9 males.

The city's median household income was $46,458, and the median family income was $52,763. Males had a median income of $30,885 versus $24,167 for females. The city's per capita income was $17,424. About 5.2% of families and 7.4% of the population were below the poverty line, including 11.3% of those under age 18 and 4.8% of those age 65 or over.

== Education ==
Cleveland Public Schools are part of the Cleveland Public School District. Cleveland Elementary School and Cleveland Secondary School are in the district and serve grades prekindergarten to twelfth grade. Brian J. Phillips is the Superintendent. The Mission of the Cleveland Public School District #391 is: Inspire, Learn, Grow, Achieve- a community where students and relationships matter.

== Infrastructure ==
=== Transportation ===
Minnesota State Highway 99 serves as a main route in the community.
