= Elysian, Minnesota =

City in Minnesota, United States

- City
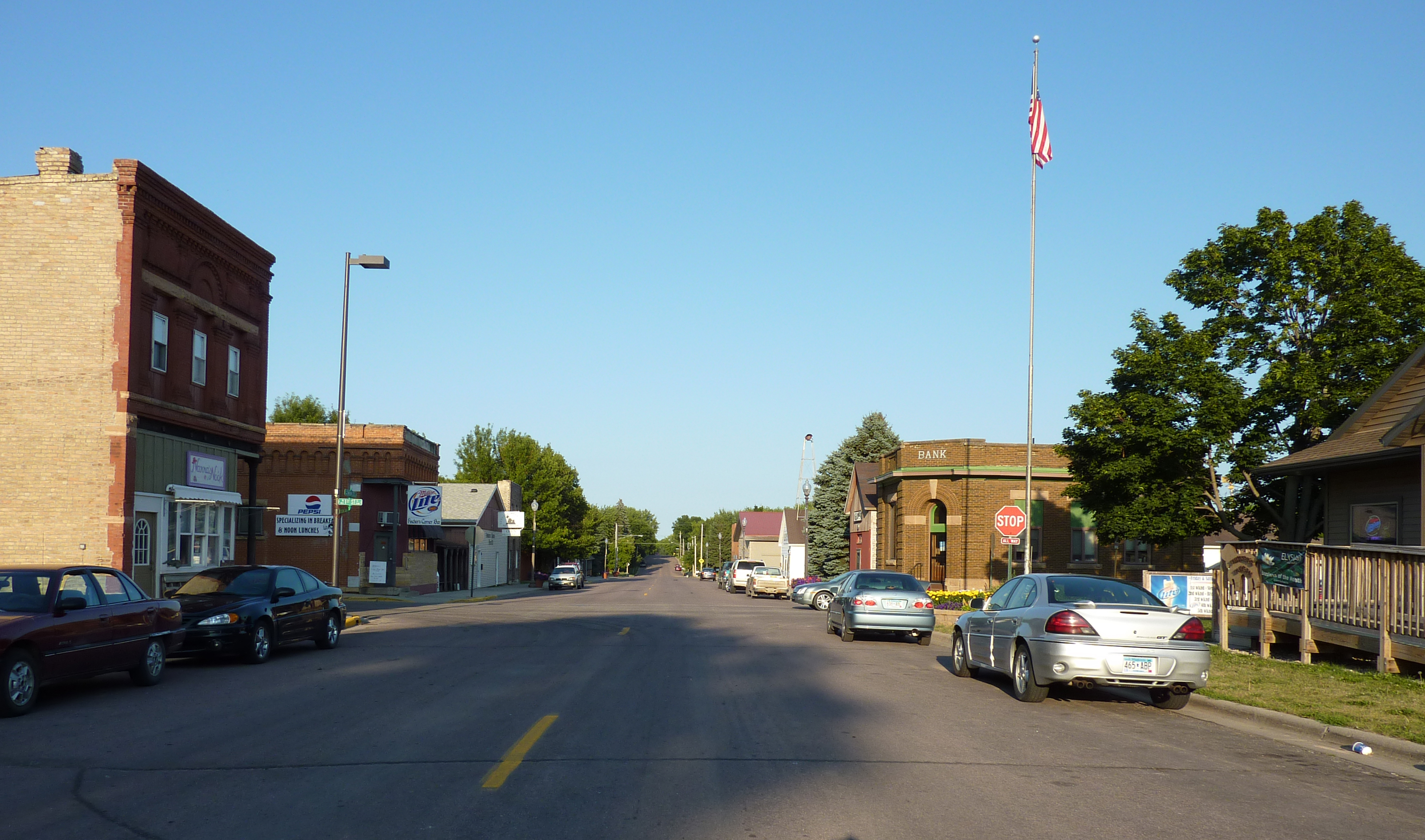
- Downtown Elysian

- Location Elysian
- Coordinates: 44°12′24″N 93°40′35″W
- Country: United States
- State: Minnesota
- Counties: Le Sueur, Waseca

Government
  - Type: Mayor – Council

Area
  - Total: 1.44 sq mi (3.73 km^{2})
  - Land: 1.18 sq mi (3.05 km^{2})
  - Water: 0.26 sq mi (0.68 km^{2})
- Elevation: 1,027 ft (313 m)

Population (2020)
  - Total: 708
  - Density: 600.8/sq mi (231.97/km^{2})
- Time zone: UTC-6 (Central (CST))
  - Summer (DST): UTC-5 (CDT)
- ZIP code: 56028
- Area code: 507
- FIPS code: 27-19160
- GNIS feature ID: 2394684
- Website: elysianmn.com

Elysian (/ɛˈliːzjən/ el-EE-zyən) is a city in Le Sueur and Waseca counties in the U.S. state of Minnesota. The population was 708 at the 2020 Census. The city is distinct from Elysian Township.

== History ==
Elysian was platted in 1856, and named for Elysium in Greek mythology. Elysian was incorporated in 1884.

== Geography ==
Elysian is about 70 miles south-southwest of Minneapolis. Minnesota Highway 60 serves as a main route in the community. According to the United States Census Bureau, the city has an area of 1.21 square miles (3.13 km^{2}); 1.18 square miles (3.06 km^{2}) is land and 0.03 square miles (0.08 km^{2}) is water.

== Demographics ==
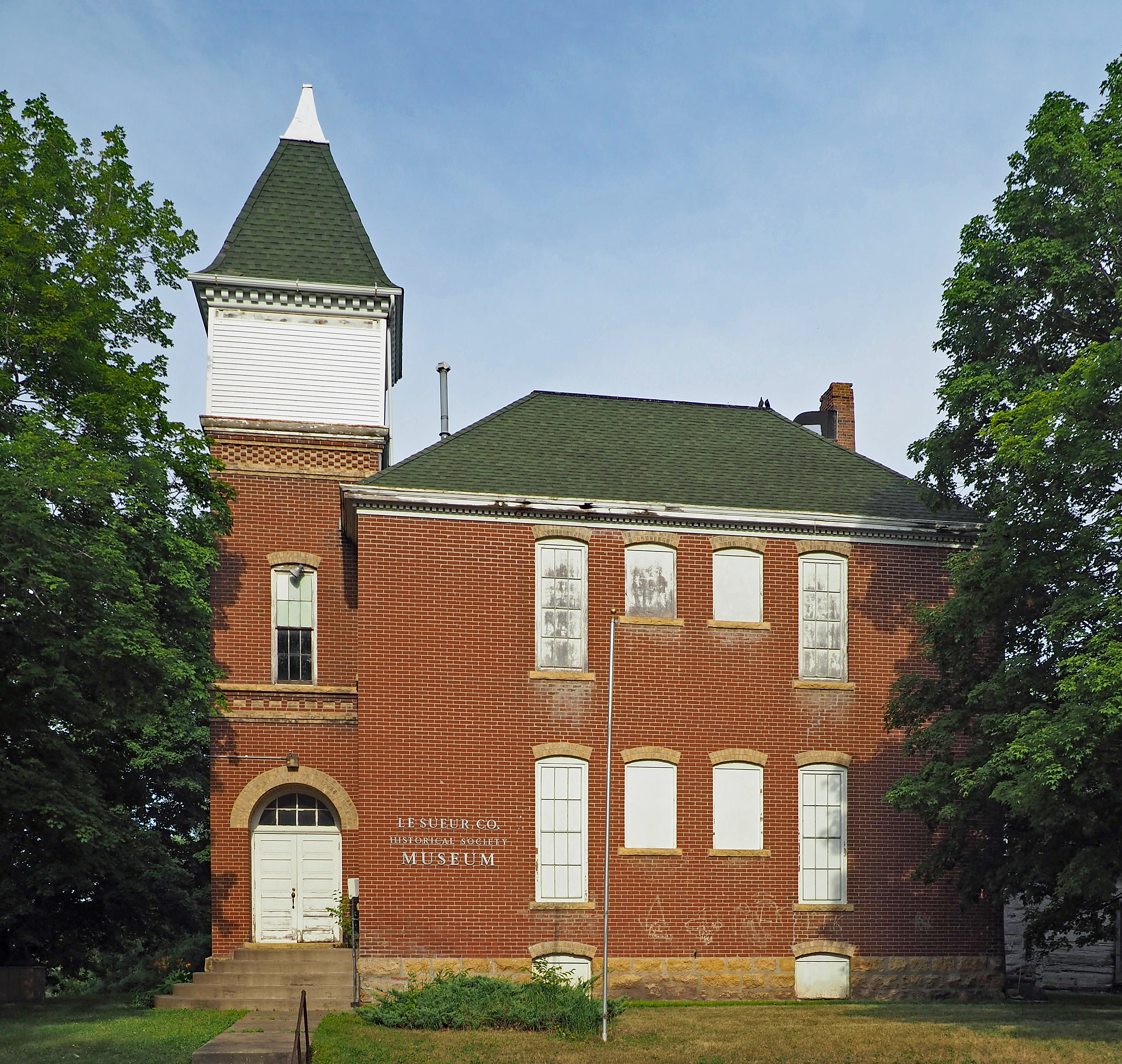
The old Elysian Public School building, now owned by the Le Sueur County Historical Society, is listed on the National Register of Historic Places.

Historical population
Census	Pop.	Note	%±
1880	167		—
1890	348		108.4%
1900	459		31.9%
1910	345		−24.8%
1920	354		2.6%
1930	388		9.6%
1940	382		−1.5%
1950	402		5.2%
1960	382		−5.0%
1970	445		16.5%
1980	454		2.0%
1990	445		−2.0%
2000	486		9.2%
2010	652		34.2%
2020	708		8.6%
U.S. Decennial Census

=== 2020 census ===
As of the Census of 2020, there were 708 people, 295 households, and 197 families living in the city. The population density was 590 inhabitants per square mile (227.8/km^{2}). There were 393 housing units at an average density of 327.5 units per square mile (126.4 units/km^{2}). The racial makeup of the city was 92.93% White, 1.12% African American, 0.70% American Native, 0.28% Asian, and 4.51% from two or more races. Hispanic or Latino of any race were 0.42% of the population.

There were 295 households, of which 14.6% had children under the age of 18 living with them, 62.0% were married couples living together, 16.9% had a female householder with no husband present, 14.6% had a male householder with no wife present. 27.8% of all households were made up of individuals, and 14.6% had someone living alone who was 65 years of age or older. The average household size was 2.20 and the average family size was 2.71.

The median age in the city was 52.8 years. 12.2% of residents were under the age of 18; 8.9% were between the ages of 18 and 24; 31.7% were from 15 to 44; and 30.5% were 65 years of age or older.

=== 2010 census ===
As of the census of 2010, there were 652 people, 273 households, and 181 families living in the city. The population density was 552.5 inhabitants per square mile (213.3/km^{2}). There were 372 housing units at an average density of 315.3 units per square mile (121.7 units/km^{2}). The racial makeup of the city was 96.6% White, 0.5% African American, 0.2% Asian, and 2.8% from two or more races. Hispanic or Latino of any race were 0.9% of the population.

There were 273 households, of which 26.7% had children under the age of 18 living with them, 56.8% were married couples living together, 5.1% had a female householder with no husband present, 4.4% had a male householder with no wife present, and 33.7% were non-families. 27.8% of all households were made up of individuals, and 13.2% had someone living alone who was 65 years of age or older. The average household size was 2.37 and the average family size was 2.84.

The median age in the city was 43.4 years. 23.6% of residents were under the age of 18; 4.9% were between the ages of 18 and 24; 23.9% were from 25 to 44; 28.4% were from 45 to 64; and 19.2% were 65 years of age or older. The gender makeup of the city was 49.4% male and 50.6% female.

=== 2000 census ===
As of the census of 2000, there were 486 people, 204 households, and 127 families living in the city. The population density was 551.3 inhabitants per square mile (212.9/km^{2}). There were 276 housing units at an average density of 313.1 units per square mile (120.9 units/km^{2}). The racial makeup of the city was 99.38% White, 0.21% from other races, and 0.41% from two or more races. Hispanic or Latino of any race were 0.82% of the population.

There were 204 households, out of which 27.9% had children under the age of 18 living with them, 53.9% were married couples living together, 5.4% had a female householder with no husband present, and 37.3% were non-families. 29.9% of all households were made up of individuals, and 15.2% had someone living alone who was 65 years of age or older. The average household size was 2.38 and the average family size was 2.95.

In the city, the population was spread out, with 23.7% under the age of 18, 8.0% from 18 to 24, 29.4% from 25 to 44, 23.7% from 45 to 64, and 15.2% who were 65 years of age or older. The median age was 38 years. For every 100 females, there were 95.2 males. For every 100 females age 18 and over, there were 92.2 males.

== Education ==
Waterville-Elysian-Morristown School District operates public schools.

== Gallery ==
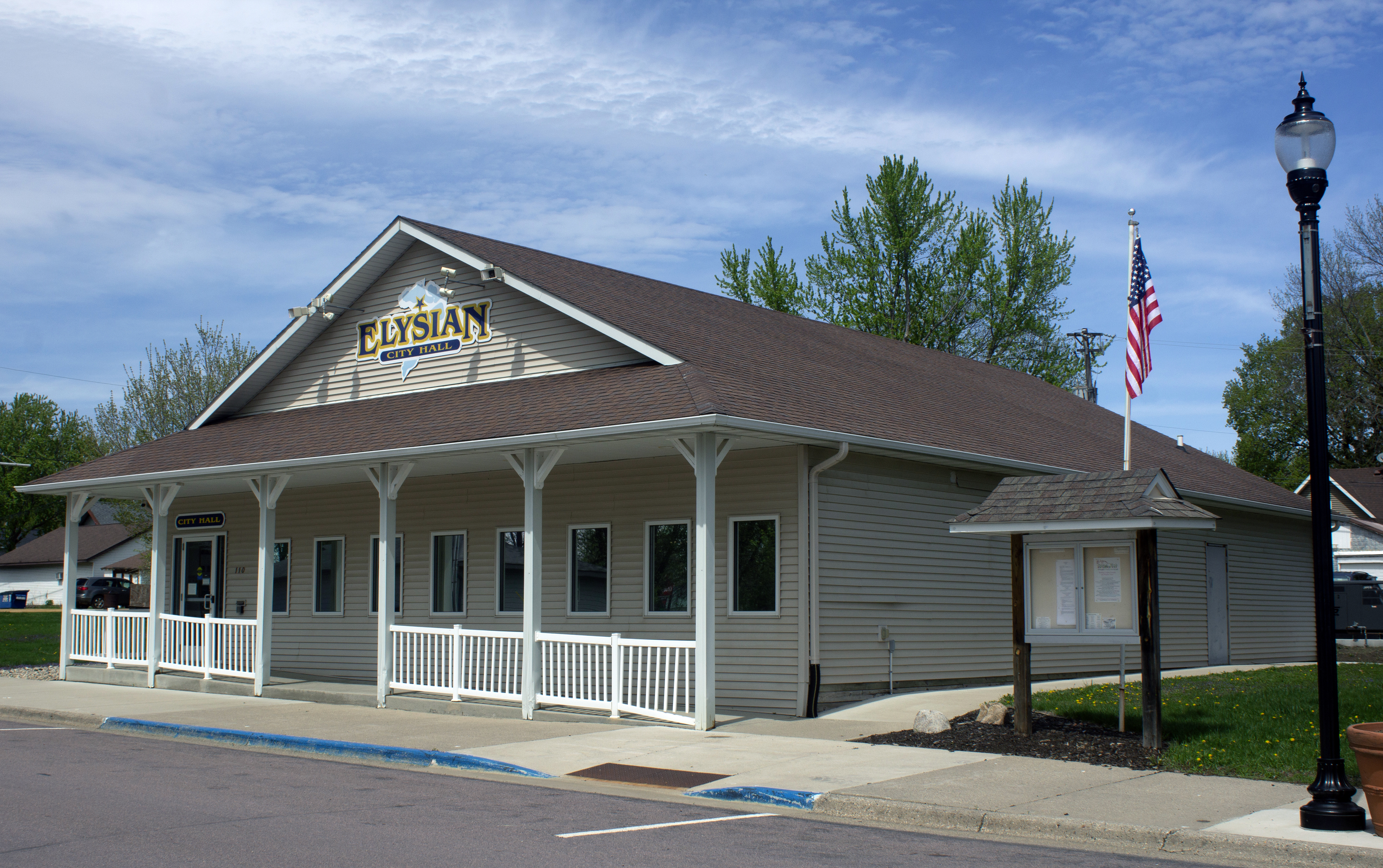
City Hall

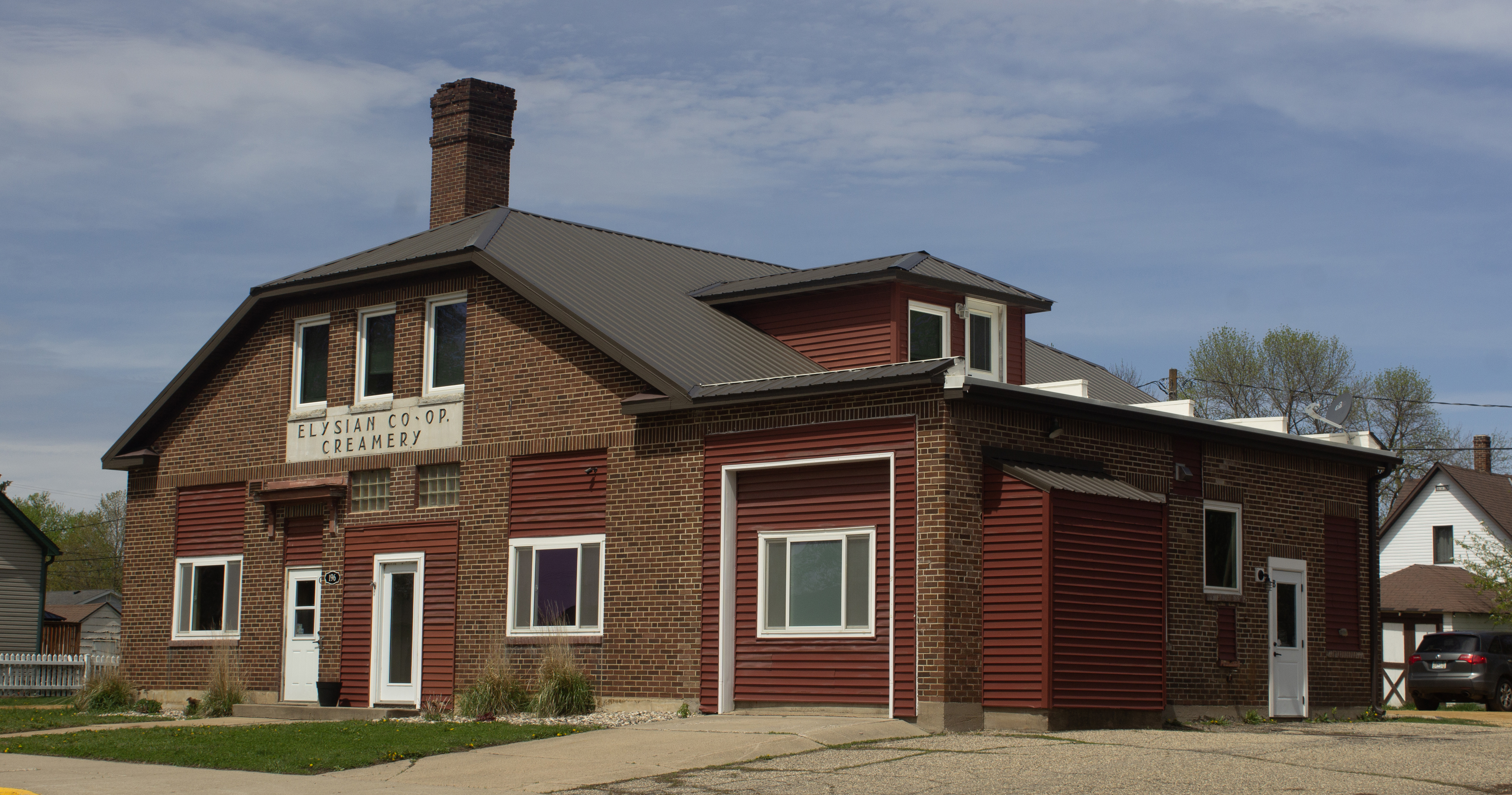
Elysian Co-op Creamery building

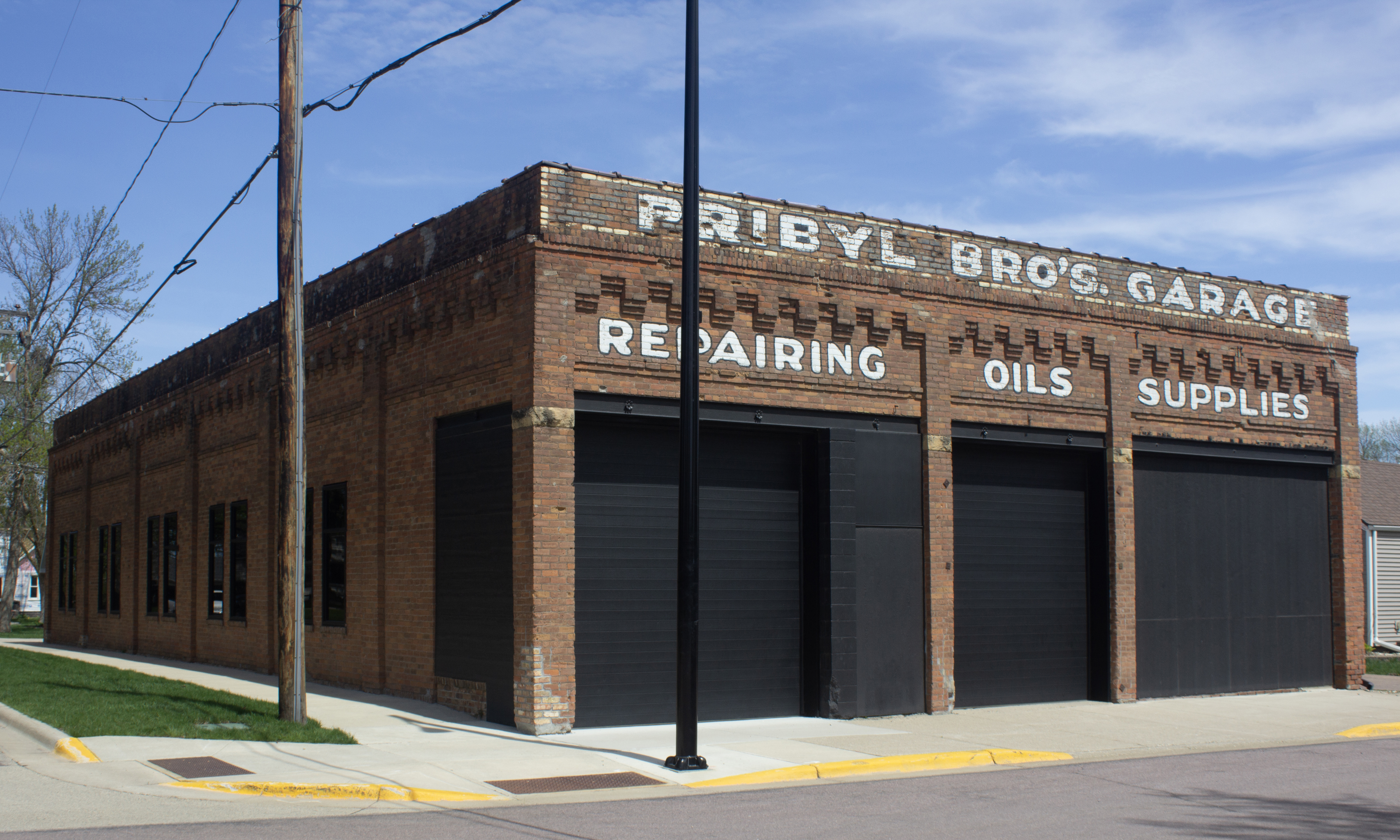
Pribyl Bro's Garage building

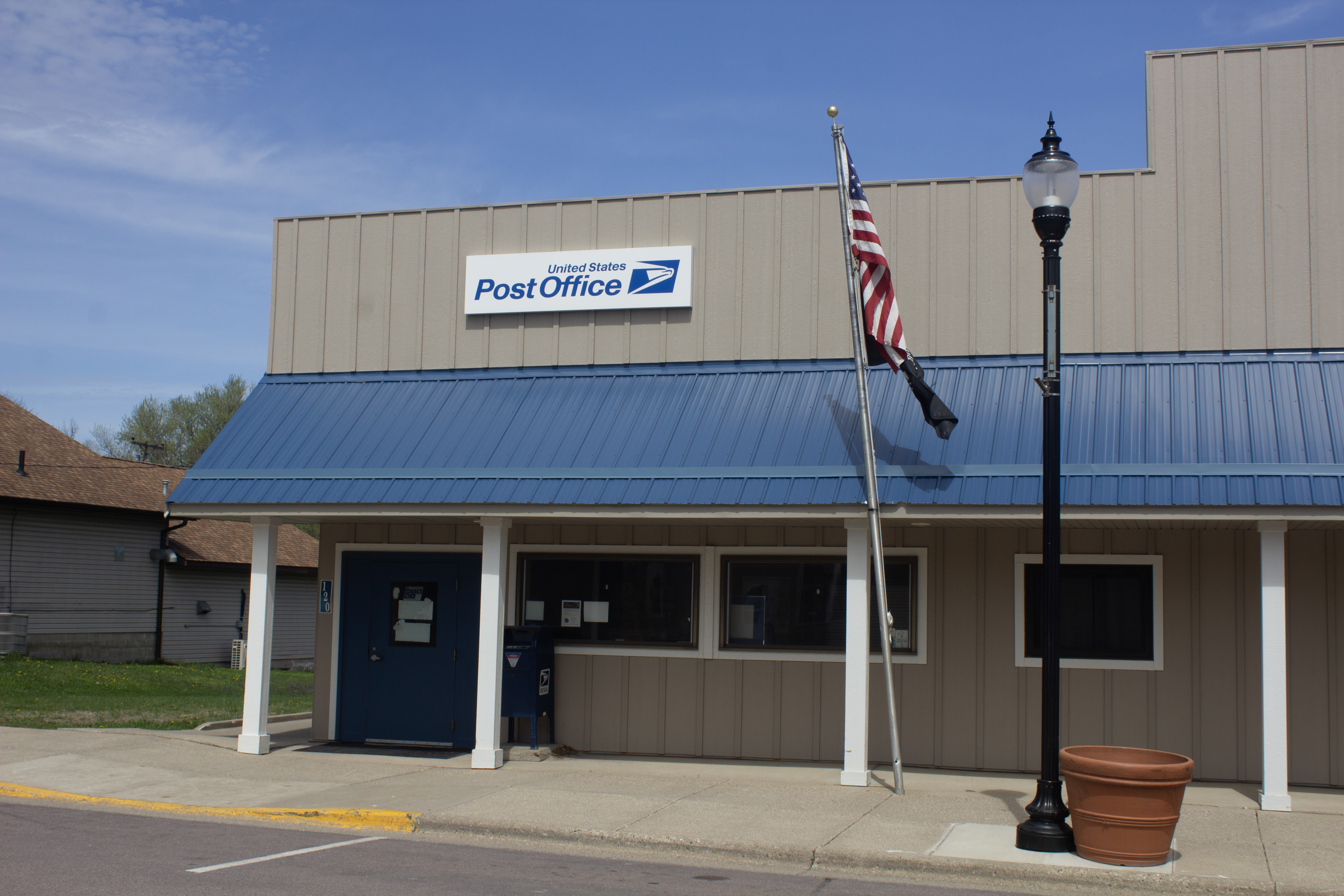
U.S. Post Office

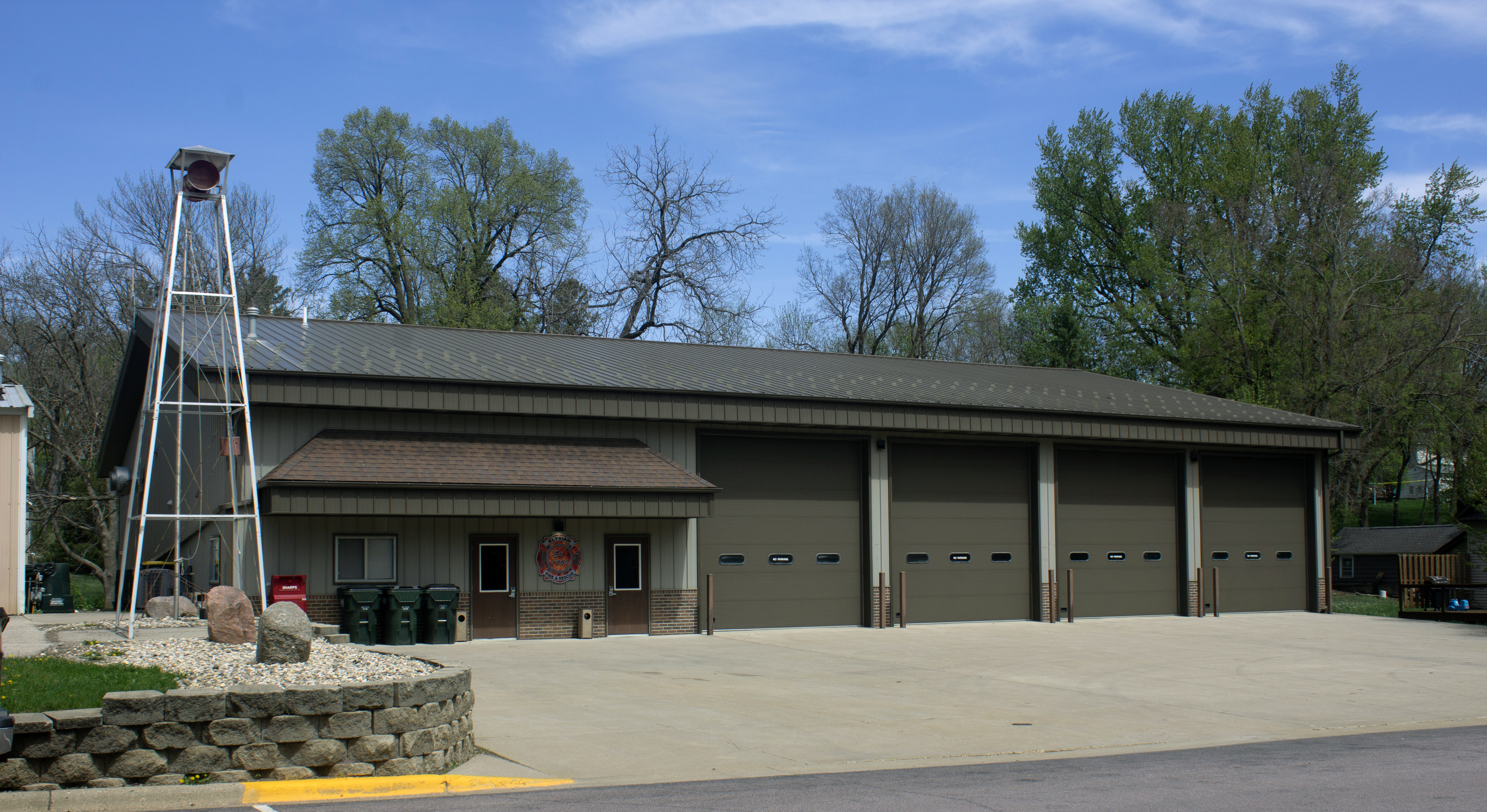
Fire Department
