= List of county roads in Nicollet County, Minnesota =

- Standard county road marker

Highway names
- Interstates: Interstate X (I-X)
- US Highways: U.S. Highway X (US X)
- State: Trunk Highway X (MN X or TH X)
- County State-Aid Highways: County State-Aid Highway X (CSAH X)
- County Roads: County Road X (CR X)

System links
- County roads of Minnesota; Nicollet County

The following is a list of county-maintained roads in Nicollet County, Minnesota, United States. Some of the routes included in this list are also county-state-aid-highways (CSAH.)

== Route list ==
Number	Length (mi)	Length (km)	Southern or western terminus	Northern or eastern terminus	Local names	Formed	Removed	Notes
CSAH 1	—	—	County 16 in West Newton Township	MN 22 in New Sweden Township		—	—	
CSAH 3	—	—	County 5 in Traverse Township	Sibley County line		—	—	
CSAH 4	—	—	MN 111 in Granby Township	County 1 in New Sweden Township		—	—	
CSAH 5	—	—	Renville County line	US 169, MN 22, and MN 99 in St. Peter	Old Fort Road	—	—	
CSAH 6	—	—	County 25 in Nicollet Township	County 41 in Belgrade Township		—	—	Western Segment
CSAH 6	—	—	Dead End in Belgrade Township	County 13 in North Mankato		—	—	Eastern Segment
CSAH 7	—	—	County 5 in Lafayette Township	Sibley County line		—	—	Unpaved
CSAH 10	—	—	County 5 in Brighton Township	Sibley County line		—	—	
CSAH 12	—	—	US 14 in Courtland	County 5 in Traverse Township		—	—	
CSAH 13	—	—	US 169 in North Mankato	County 15 in Bernadotte Township		—	—	
CSAH 14	—	—	County 21 in West Newton Township	County 5 in West Newton Township		—	—	
CSAH 15	—	—	MN 15 in Lafayette Township	MN 22 in St. Peter		—	—	
CSAH 16	—	—	County 5 in West Newton Township	Sibley County line		—	—	
CSAH 17	—	—	US 14 in Belgrade Township	MN 99 in Oshawa Township		—	—	
CSAH 18	—	—	County 3 in Lake Prairie Township	County 20 in Lake Prairie Township		—	—	Unpaved
CSAH 19	—	—	County 15 in Traverse Township	County 18 in Lake Prairie Township		—	—	Unpaved
CSAH 20	—	—	County 5 in St. Peter	Sibley County line		—	—	
CSAH 21	—	—	County 25 in Courtland Township	Renville County line		—	—	
CSAH 22	—	—	County 5 in West Newton Township	Sibley County line		—	—	
CSAH 23	—	—	Blue Earth County line	US 14 in Nicollet		—	—	
CSAH 24	—	—	Blue Earth County line	US 14 in Courtland		—	—	
CSAH 25	—	—	US 14 in Courtland Township	County 17 in Belgrade Township		—	—	
CSAH 27	—	—	County 5 in Ridgely Township	Renville County line		—	—	
CSAH 30	—	—	County 21 in Ridgely Township	Renville County line		—	—	
CSAH 32	—	—	County 1 in Lafayette	571st Avenue in Lafayette Township		—	—	
CSAH 37	—	—	Brown County line	US 14 in Courtland Township		—	—	
CSAH 38	—	—	MN 15 in Lafayette Township	MN 15 in Lafayette Township		—	—	
CSAH 40	—	—	MN 99 in Oshawa Township	County 15 in Traverse Township		—	—	
CSAH 41	—	—	County 23 in Nicollet Township	County 6 in Belgrade Township	Judson Bottom Road, Rockford Road	—	—	Only the section between CSAH 23 and CR 71 is known as Judson Bottom Road. The section between CR 71 and CSAH 6 is known as Rockford Road.
CSAH 42	—	—	US 14 in Nicollet Township	MN 99 in Nicollet		—	—	
CR 51	—	—	County 15 in Traverse Township	County 20 in St. Peter		—	—	
CR 52	—	—	MN 22 in New Sweden Township	County 3 in New Sweden Township		—	—	
CSAH 52	—	—	County 3 in Lake Prairie Township	MN 22 in Lake Prairie Township		—	—	Unpaved
CR 56	—	—	County 21 in West Newton Township	County 5 in West Newton Township		—	—	
CR 57	—	—	County 7 in Lafayette Township	County 1 in Lafayette Township		—	—	Unpaved
CR 59	—	—	County 21 in West Newton Township	County 5 in West Newton Township		—	—	Unpaved
CR 60	—	—	County 1 in New Sweden Township	MN 22 and MN 111 in New Sweden Township		—	—	Unpaved
CR 61	—	—	County 1 in Bernadotte Township	MN 111 in New Sweden Township		—	—	Unpaved
CR 62	—	—	Hebron Drive in Nicollet Township	County 25 in Nicollet Township		—	—	Unpaved
CR 63	—	—	County 15 in Lake Prairie Township	County 18 in Lake Prairie Township		—	—	Unpaved
CR 65	—	—	County 5 in Brighton Township	County 15 in Bernadotte Township		—	—	Unpaved
CR 70	—	—	County 5 in Brighton Township	County 15 in Bernadotte Township		—	—	Unpaved
CR 71	—	—	County 41 in Belgrade Township	County 13 in North Mankato	Judson Bottom Road	—	—	
CR 74	—	—	Traverse Road in St. Peter	Washington Avenue in St. Peter		—	—	
CR 75	—	—	MN 22 in Lake Prairie Township	County 18 in Lake Prairie Township		—	—	Unpaved
CSAH 76	—	—	County 20 in Lake Prairie Township	US 169 in Lake Prairie Township		—	—	
CR 77	—	—	County 6 in Belgrade Township	US 14 in Belgrade Township		—	—	
CR 78	—	—	Dead End in Brighton Township	County 4 in Granby Township		—	—	
CR 82	—	—	County 15 in Bernadotte Township	County 1 in Bernadotte Township		—	—	Unpaved
CR 88	—	—	County 7 in Lafayette Township	MN 15 in Lafayette Township		—	—	Unpaved
Former
