= Mankato metropolitan area =

Statistical area in Minnesota, US

Coordinates: 44°10′N 94°0′W

Mankato Metropolitan Area
- Metropolitan Statistical Area
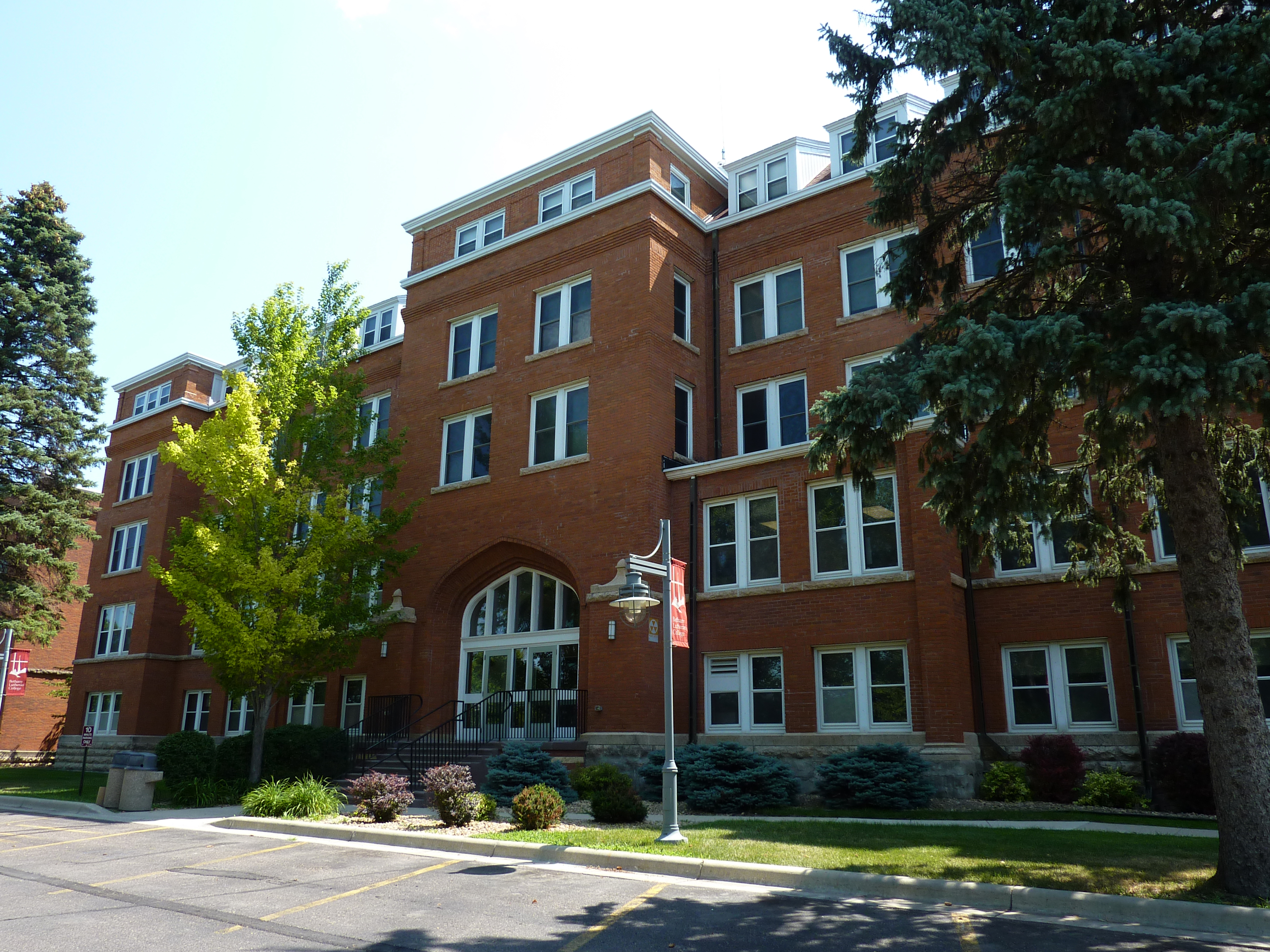
- Bethany Lutheran College in Mankato
Map of Mankato–New Ulm, MN CSA
City of Mankato
City of North Mankato
Mankato, MN MSA
New Ulm, MN µSA
- Country: United States
- State: Minnesota
- Principal city: Mankato
- Other cities: North Mankato; St. Peter
- Time zone: UTC−6 (CST)
  - Summer (DST): UTC−5 (CDT)

The Mankato, MN Metropolitan Statistical Area, as defined by the United States Census Bureau, is an area consisting of two counties in south central Minnesota, anchored by the cities of Mankato and North Mankato. It was upgraded from a Micropolitan Statistical Area (μSA) to a Metropolitan Statistical Area (MSA) by the Office of Management and Budget on November 20, 2008. In September 2018, North Mankato was removed as a principal city and dropped from the MSA's name. The Mankato–New Ulm, MN Combined Statistical Area includes the separate micropolitan area of New Ulm (Brown County). As of the 2020 census, the MSA had a population of 103,566.

== Demographics ==
Mankato, MN Metropolitan Statistical Area

County	Seat	2025 Estimate	2020 Census	Change	Area	Density
Blue Earth	Mankato	70,634	69,112	+2.20%	766 sq mi (1,980 km^{2})	92/sq mi (36/km^{2})
Nicollet	St. Peter	34,273	34,454	−0.53%	467 sq mi (1,210 km^{2})	73/sq mi (28/km^{2})
Total		104,907	103,566	+1.29%	1,233 sq mi (3,190 km^{2})	85/sq mi (33/km^{2})

Mankato–New Ulm, MN Combined Statistical Area

Statistical Area	2025 Estimate	2020 Census	Change	Area	Density
Mankato, MN Metropolitan Statistical Area	104,907	103,566	+1.29%	1,233 sq mi (3,190 km^{2})	85/sq mi (33/km^{2})
New Ulm, MN Micropolitan Statistical Area	25,517	25,912	−1.52%	618 sq mi (1,600 km^{2})	41/sq mi (16/km^{2})
Total	130,424	129,478	+0.73%	1,851 sq mi (4,790 km^{2})	70/sq mi (27/km^{2})

== Communities ==
The following are cities in the Mankato, MN MSA categorized based on the United States Census Bureau 2025 population estimates. No population estimates are released for census-designated places (CDPs), which are marked with an asterisk (*). These places are categorized based on their 2020 Census population.

=== Principal city ===
- Mankato (partial) (Note: Mankato lies in three counties – Blue Earth, Nicollet, and Le Sueur. Most of the city is in Blue Earth County with small portions extending into the neighboring counties. The portion of Mankato in Le Sueur County is part of the Minneapolis–St. Paul–Bloomington, MN–WI Metropolitan Statistical Area, while the Blue Earth and Nicollet County portions are part of the Mankato, MN Metropolitan Statistical Area.) (46,529)

=== Places with 10,000 to 20,000 inhabitants ===
- North Mankato (14,165)
- St. Peter (12,275)

=== Places with 1,000 to 10,000 inhabitants ===
- Eagle Lake (3,357)
- Lake Crystal (2,470)
- Mapleton (1,622)
- Madison Lake (1,315)
- Nicollet (1,127)

=== Places with 500 to 1,000 inhabitants ===
- Courtland (714)
- St. Clair (707)
- Minnesota Lake (partial) (662)
- Good Thunder (536)
- Amboy (507)

=== Places with less than 500 inhabitants ===
- Lafayette (462)
- Garden City* (339)
- Vernon Center (315)
- Skyline (283)
- Pemberton (219)

=== Unincorporated places ===
- Klossner
- Norseland
- St. George

== Townships ==
=== Blue Earth County ===
- Beauford Township
- Butternut Valley Township
- Cambria Township
- Ceresco Township
- Danville Township
- Decoria Township
- Garden City Township
- Jamestown Township
- Judson Township
- Le Ray Township
- Lime Township
- Lincoln Township
- Lyra Township
- Mankato Township
- Mapleton Township
- McPherson Township
- Medo Township
- Pleasant Mound Township
- Rapidan Township
- Shelby Township
- South Bend Township
- Sterling Township
- Vernon Center Township

=== Nicollet County ===
- Belgrade Township
- Bernadotte Township
- Brighton Township
- Courtland Township
- Granby Township
- Lafayette Township
- Lake Prairie Township
- New Sweden Township
- Nicollet Township
- Oshawa Township
- Ridgely Township
- Traverse Township
- West Newton Township

== Demographics ==
Historical population
Census	Pop.	Note	%±
1860	8,581		—
1870	25,664		199.1%
1880	35,222		37.2%
1890	42,592		20.9%
1900	47,037		10.4%
1910	43,462		−7.6%
1920	46,513		7.0%
1930	50,397		8.4%
1940	54,485		8.1%
1950	59,256		8.8%
1960	67,581		14.0%
1970	76,840		13.7%
1980	79,243		3.1%
1990	82,120		3.6%
2000	85,712		4.4%
2010	96,740		12.9%
2020	103,566		7.1%
U.S. Decennial Census; 2020 Census

As of the 2000 census, there were 85,712 people, 31,704 households, and 19,927 families residing within the μSA (now MSA). The racial makeup of the μSA (now MSA) was 95.45% White, 1.06% African American, 0.27% Native American, 1.56% Asian, 0.05% Pacific Islander, 0.68% from other races, and 0.93% from two or more races. Hispanic or Latino of any race were 1.73% of the population.

The median income for a household in the μSA (now MSA) was $42,555, and the median income for a family was $52,976. Males had a median income of $34,162 versus $23,936 for females. The per capita income for the μSA (now MSA) was $19,615.

== See also ==
- Minnesota census statistical areas
