= New Sweden, Minnesota =

New Sweden
- Unincorporated community
- Location within Minnesota Location within the United States
- Coordinates: 44°24′27″N 94°11′24″W
- Country: United States
- State: Minnesota
- County: Nicollet
- Township: New Sweden Township
- Elevation: 997 ft (304 m)
- Time zone: UTC-6 (Central (CST))
  - Summer (DST): UTC-5 (CDT)
- ZIP code: 56074 and 55334
- Area code: 507
- GNIS feature ID: 654845

New Sweden is an unincorporated community in New Sweden Township, Nicollet County, Minnesota, United States. The community is located near the junction of State Highways 22 (MN 22) and 111 (MN 111).

A post office named New Sweden was opened in 1884 and operated until 1905. The community received its name because many of its early settlers were immigrants from Sweden.
