= Minnesota statistical areas =

Coordinates: 46.2807°N 94.3053°W

The U.S. State of Minnesota currently has 34 statistical areas that have been delineated by the Office of Management and Budget (OMB). On July 21, 2023, the OMB delineated six combined statistical areas, nine metropolitan statistical areas, and 19 micropolitan statistical areas in Minnesota. As of 2025, the largest of these is the Minneapolis–St. Paul, MN-WI CSA, comprising the area around the state's twin cities — Minneapolis, its largest city, and St. Paul, its capital.

== Statistical areas ==
The Office of Management and Budget (OMB) has designated more than 1,000 statistical areas for the United States and Puerto Rico. These statistical areas are important geographic delineations of population clusters used by the OMB, the United States Census Bureau, planning organizations, and federal, state, and local government entities.

The OMB defines a core-based statistical area (commonly referred to as a CBSA) as the county or counties (or county-equivalents) surrounding at least one densely-settled core of at least 10,000 population, "plus adjacent counties having a high degree of social and economic integration with the core as measured through commuting ties with the counties containing the core". The OMB further divides core-based statistical areas based on population into metropolitan statistical areas (MSAs) for those with at least 50,000 and micropolitan statistical areas (μSAs) for those with 10,000 to 49,999 people.

The OMB defines a combined statistical area (CSA) as two or more adjacent core-based statistical areas where the employment interchange rate (% commuting from A to B plus % commuting from B to A) is at least 15%. The primary statistical areas (PSAs) include all combined statistical areas and any core-based statistical area that is not a constituent of a combined statistical area.

The 34 United States statistical areas and 87 counties of the State of Minnesota (Note: An out-of-state area and its population are displayed in green. An area that extends into more than one state is displayed in purple. A purple population number over a black population number show the total population versus the in-state population. The state's abbreviation is also shown next to the in-state total.)
Combined statistical area	2025 population (est.)	Core-based statistical area	2025 population (est.)	County	2025 population (est.)
Minneapolis–St. Paul, MN-WI CSA	4,188,378; 4,046,583 (MN)	Minneapolis–St. Paul–Bloomington, MN-WI MSA	3,790,295; 3,648,500 (MN)	Hennepin County, Minnesota	1,284,784
Minneapolis–St. Paul, MN-WI CSA	4,188,378; 4,046,583 (MN)	Minneapolis–St. Paul–Bloomington, MN-WI MSA	3,790,295; 3,648,500 (MN)	Ramsey County, Minnesota	541,623
Minneapolis–St. Paul, MN-WI CSA	4,188,378; 4,046,583 (MN)	Minneapolis–St. Paul–Bloomington, MN-WI MSA	3,790,295; 3,648,500 (MN)	Dakota County, Minnesota	457,710
Minneapolis–St. Paul, MN-WI CSA	4,188,378; 4,046,583 (MN)	Minneapolis–St. Paul–Bloomington, MN-WI MSA	3,790,295; 3,648,500 (MN)	Anoka County, Minnesota	381,605
Minneapolis–St. Paul, MN-WI CSA	4,188,378; 4,046,583 (MN)	Minneapolis–St. Paul–Bloomington, MN-WI MSA	3,790,295; 3,648,500 (MN)	Washington County, Minnesota	286,895
Minneapolis–St. Paul, MN-WI CSA	4,188,378; 4,046,583 (MN)	Minneapolis–St. Paul–Bloomington, MN-WI MSA	3,790,295; 3,648,500 (MN)	Scott County, Minnesota	159,017
Minneapolis–St. Paul, MN-WI CSA	4,188,378; 4,046,583 (MN)	Minneapolis–St. Paul–Bloomington, MN-WI MSA	3,790,295; 3,648,500 (MN)	Wright County, Minnesota	157,559
Minneapolis–St. Paul, MN-WI CSA	4,188,378; 4,046,583 (MN)	Minneapolis–St. Paul–Bloomington, MN-WI MSA	3,790,295; 3,648,500 (MN)	Carver County, Minnesota	114,379
Minneapolis–St. Paul, MN-WI CSA	4,188,378; 4,046,583 (MN)	Minneapolis–St. Paul–Bloomington, MN-WI MSA	3,790,295; 3,648,500 (MN)	Sherburne County, Minnesota	104,194
Minneapolis–St. Paul, MN-WI CSA	4,188,378; 4,046,583 (MN)	Minneapolis–St. Paul–Bloomington, MN-WI MSA	3,790,295; 3,648,500 (MN)	St. Croix County, Wisconsin	98,276
Minneapolis–St. Paul, MN-WI CSA	4,188,378; 4,046,583 (MN)	Minneapolis–St. Paul–Bloomington, MN-WI MSA	3,790,295; 3,648,500 (MN)	Chisago County, Minnesota	59,142
Minneapolis–St. Paul, MN-WI CSA	4,188,378; 4,046,583 (MN)	Minneapolis–St. Paul–Bloomington, MN-WI MSA	3,790,295; 3,648,500 (MN)	Isanti County, Minnesota	44,386
Minneapolis–St. Paul, MN-WI CSA	4,188,378; 4,046,583 (MN)	Minneapolis–St. Paul–Bloomington, MN-WI MSA	3,790,295; 3,648,500 (MN)	Pierce County, Wisconsin	43,519
Minneapolis–St. Paul, MN-WI CSA	4,188,378; 4,046,583 (MN)	Minneapolis–St. Paul–Bloomington, MN-WI MSA	3,790,295; 3,648,500 (MN)	Le Sueur County, Minnesota	29,453
Minneapolis–St. Paul, MN-WI CSA	4,188,378; 4,046,583 (MN)	Minneapolis–St. Paul–Bloomington, MN-WI MSA	3,790,295; 3,648,500 (MN)	Mille Lacs County, Minnesota	27,753
Minneapolis–St. Paul, MN-WI CSA	4,188,378; 4,046,583 (MN)	St. Cloud, MN MSA	205,854	Stearns County, Minnesota	164,110
Minneapolis–St. Paul, MN-WI CSA	4,188,378; 4,046,583 (MN)	St. Cloud, MN MSA	205,854	Benton County, Minnesota	41,744
Minneapolis–St. Paul, MN-WI CSA	4,188,378; 4,046,583 (MN)	Faribault–Northfield, MN μSA	69,939	Rice County, Minnesota	69,939
Minneapolis–St. Paul, MN-WI CSA	4,188,378; 4,046,583 (MN)	Red Wing, MN μSA	48,195	Goodhue County, Minnesota	48,195
Minneapolis–St. Paul, MN-WI CSA	4,188,378; 4,046,583 (MN)	Owatonna, MN μSA	37,464	Steele County, Minnesota	37,464
Minneapolis–St. Paul, MN-WI CSA	4,188,378; 4,046,583 (MN)	Hutchinson, MN μSA	36,631	McLeod County, Minnesota	36,631
Rochester–Austin–Winona, MN CSA	322,678	Rochester, MN MSA	231,184	Olmsted County, Minnesota	166,731
Rochester–Austin–Winona, MN CSA	322,678	Rochester, MN MSA	231,184	Fillmore County, Minnesota	21,540
Rochester–Austin–Winona, MN CSA	322,678	Rochester, MN MSA	231,184	Wabasha County, Minnesota	21,537
Rochester–Austin–Winona, MN CSA	322,678	Rochester, MN MSA	231,184	Dodge County, Minnesota	21,376
Rochester–Austin–Winona, MN CSA	322,678	Winona, MN μSA	50,523	Winona County, Minnesota	50,523
Rochester–Austin–Winona, MN CSA	322,678	Austin, MN μSA	40,971	Mower County, Minnesota	40,971
Duluth–Grand Rapids, MN-WI MSA	326,623; 282,633 (MN)	Duluth, MN-WI MSA	281,219; 237,229 (MN)	St. Louis County, Minnesota	200,518
Duluth–Grand Rapids, MN-WI MSA	326,623; 282,633 (MN)	Duluth, MN-WI MSA	281,219; 237,229 (MN)	Douglas County, Wisconsin	43,990
Duluth–Grand Rapids, MN-WI MSA	326,623; 282,633 (MN)	Duluth, MN-WI MSA	281,219; 237,229 (MN)	Carlton County, Minnesota	36,711
Duluth–Grand Rapids, MN-WI MSA	326,623; 282,633 (MN)	Grand Rapids, MN μSA	45,404	Itasca County, Minnesota	45,404
Mankato–New Ulm, MN CSA	130,424	Mankato, MN MSA	104,907	Blue Earth County, Minnesota	70,634
Mankato–New Ulm, MN CSA	130,424	Mankato, MN MSA	104,907	Nicollet County, Minnesota	34,273
Mankato–New Ulm, MN CSA	130,424	New Ulm, MN μSA	25,517	Brown County, Minnesota	25,517
none		Brainerd, MN μSA	100,562	Crow Wing County, Minnesota	69,132
none		Brainerd, MN μSA	100,562	Cass County, Minnesota	31,430
Fargo–Wahpeton, ND-MN CSA	292,547; 74,022 (MN)	Fargo, ND-MN MSA	269,528; 67,734 (MN)	Cass County, North Dakota	201,794
Fargo–Wahpeton, ND-MN CSA	292,547; 74,022 (MN)	Fargo, ND-MN MSA	269,528; 67,734 (MN)	Clay County, Minnesota	67,734
Fargo–Wahpeton, ND-MN CSA	292,547; 74,022 (MN)	Wahpeton, ND-MN μSA	23,019; 6,288 (MN)	Richland County, North Dakota	16,731
Fargo–Wahpeton, ND-MN CSA	292,547; 74,022 (MN)	Wahpeton, ND-MN μSA	23,019; 6,288 (MN)	Wilkin County, Minnesota	6,288
none		Fergus Falls, MN μSA	61,041	Otter Tail County, Minnesota	61,041
none		Bemidji, MN μSA	47,055	Beltrami County, Minnesota	47,055
none		Willmar, MN μSA	44,720	Kandiyohi County, Minnesota	44,720
none		Alexandria, MN μSA	40,120	Douglas County, Minnesota	40,120
none		Detroit Lakes, MN μSA	35,497	Becker County, Minnesota	35,497
none		Grand Forks, ND-MN MSA	105,046; 30,545 (MN)	Grand Forks County, North Dakota	74,501
none		Grand Forks, ND-MN MSA	105,046; 30,545 (MN)	Polk County, Minnesota	30,545
none		Albert Lea, MN μSA	30,440	Freeborn County, Minnesota	30,440
none		Marshall, MN μSA	25,684	Lyon County, Minnesota	25,684
none		Worthington, MN μSA	22,338	Nobles County, Minnesota	22,338
none		Fairmont, MN μSA	19,440	Martin County, Minnesota	19,440
La Crosse–Onalaska–Sparta, WI-MN MSA	217,754; 18,400 (MN)	La Crosse–Onalaska, WI-MN MSA	171,182; 18,400 (MN)	La Crosse County, Wisconsin	121,339
La Crosse–Onalaska–Sparta, WI-MN MSA	217,754; 18,400 (MN)	La Crosse–Onalaska, WI-MN MSA	171,182; 18,400 (MN)	Vernon County, Wisconsin	31,443
La Crosse–Onalaska–Sparta, WI-MN MSA	217,754; 18,400 (MN)	La Crosse–Onalaska, WI-MN MSA	171,182; 18,400 (MN)	Houston County, Minnesota	18,400
La Crosse–Onalaska–Sparta, WI-MN MSA	217,754; 18,400 (MN)	Sparta, WI μSA	46,572	Monroe County, Wisconsin	46,572
none		Sioux Falls, SD-MN MSA	314,638; 9,524 (MN)	Minnehaha County, South Dakota	212,691
none		Sioux Falls, SD-MN MSA	314,638; 9,524 (MN)	Lincoln County, South Dakota	77,145
none		Sioux Falls, SD-MN MSA	314,638; 9,524 (MN)	Rock County, Minnesota	9,524
none		Sioux Falls, SD-MN MSA	314,638; 9,524 (MN)	Turner County, South Dakota	9,314
none		Sioux Falls, SD-MN MSA	314,638; 9,524 (MN)	McCook County, South Dakota	5,964
none		none		Morrison County, Minnesota	34,620
none		none		Pine County, Minnesota	30,472
none		none		Todd County, Minnesota	26,060
none		none		Meeker County, Minnesota	23,603
none		none		Hubbard County, Minnesota	22,369
none		none		Waseca County, Minnesota	18,688
none		none		Kanabec County, Minnesota	16,628
none		none		Aitkin County, Minnesota	16,252
none		none		Sibley County, Minnesota	15,356
none		none		Redwood County, Minnesota	15,265
none		none		Roseau County, Minnesota	15,246
none		none		Wadena County, Minnesota	14,388
none		none		Renville County, Minnesota	14,356
none		none		Faribault County, Minnesota	13,888
none		none		Pennington County, Minnesota	13,686
none		none		Chippewa County, Minnesota	12,406
none		none		Koochiching County, Minnesota	11,587
none		none		Watonwan County, Minnesota	11,459
none		none		Pope County, Minnesota	11,420
none		none		Cottonwood County, Minnesota	11,405
none		none		Lake County, Minnesota	10,746
none		none		Jackson County, Minnesota	9,857
none		none		Swift County, Minnesota	9,763
none		none		Stevens County, Minnesota	9,747
none		none		Yellow Medicine County, Minnesota	9,477
none		none		Pipestone County, Minnesota	9,260
none		none		Marshall County, Minnesota	8,798
none		none		Clearwater County, Minnesota	8,647
none		none		Murray County, Minnesota	7,942
none		none		Lac qui Parle County, Minnesota	6,704
none		none		Norman County, Minnesota	6,336
none		none		Grant County, Minnesota	6,085
none		none		Lincoln County, Minnesota	5,583
none		none		Cook County, Minnesota	5,522
none		none		Mahnomen County, Minnesota	5,153
none		none		Big Stone County, Minnesota	5,054
none		none		Kittson County, Minnesota	4,031
none		none		Red Lake County, Minnesota	3,940
none		none		Lake of the Woods County, Minnesota	3,770
none		none		Traverse County, Minnesota	3,130
State of Minnesota					5,830,405

The 28 core-based statistical areas of the State of Minnesota (Note: For CBSAs comprising populations from multiple states, they are listed twice to show both their intrastate population within that CBSA as well as the CBSA's total population. Only the intrastate population is ranked.)
2025 rank	Core-based statistical area	Population				
2025 rank	Core-based statistical area	2025 estimate	Change	2020 Census	Change	2010 Census
1	Minneapolis–St. Paul–Bloomington, MN-WI MSA (MN)	3,648,500	+2.64%	3,554,513	+10.79%	3,208,269
2	Duluth, MN-WI MSA (MN)	237,229	+0.33%	236,438	+0.35%	235,612
3	Rochester, MN MSA	231,184	+2.15%	226,329	+9.40%	206,877
4	St. Cloud, MN MSA	205,854	+3.10%	199,671	+5.59%	189,093
5	Mankato, MN MSA	104,907	+1.29%	103,566	+7.06%	96,740
6	Brainerd, MN μSA	100,562	+4.55%	96,189	+5.62%	91,067
7	Faribault–Northfield, MN μSA	69,939	+4.24%	67,097	+4.61%	64,142
8	Fargo, ND-MN MSA (MN)	67,734	+3.70%	65,318	+10.71%	58,999
9	Fergus Falls, MN μSA	61,041	+1.60%	60,081	+4.85%	57,303
10	Winona, MN μSA	50,523	+1.72%	49,671	−3.48%	51,461
11	Red Wing, MN μSA	48,195	+1.29%	47,582	+3.03%	46,183
12	Bemidji, MN μSA	47,055	+1.79%	46,228	+4.02%	44,442
13	Grand Rapids, MN μSA	45,404	+0.87%	45,014	−0.10%	45,058
14	Willmar, MN μSA	44,720	+2.26%	43,732	+3.53%	42,239
15	Austin, MN μSA	40,971	+2.35%	40,029	+2.21%	39,163
16	Alexandria, MN μSA	40,120	+2.86%	39,006	+8.32%	36,009
17	Owatonna, MN μSA	37,464	+0.16%	37,406	+2.27%	36,576
18	Hutchinson, MN μSA	36,631	−0.38%	36,771	+0.33%	36,651
19	Detroit Lakes, MN μSA	35,497	+0.89%	35,183	+8.24%	32,504
20	Grand Forks, ND-MN MSA (MN)	30,545	−2.07%	31,192	−1.29%	31,600
21	Albert Lea, MN μSA	30,440	−1.47%	30,895	−1.15%	31,255
22	Marshall, MN μSA	25,684	+1.64%	25,269	−2.27%	25,857
23	New Ulm, MN μSA	25,517	−1.52%	25,912	+0.07%	25,893
24	Worthington, MN μSA	22,338	+0.22%	22,290	+4.27%	21,378
25	Fairmont, MN μSA	19,440	−2.92%	20,025	−3.91%	20,840
26	La Crosse–Onalaska, WI-MN MSA (MN)	18,400	−2.35%	18,843	−0.97%	19,027
27	Sioux Falls, SD-MN MSA (MN)	9,524	−1.85%	9,704	+0.18%	9,687
28	Wahpeton, ND-MN μSA (MN)	6,288	−3.35%	6,506	−1.06%	6,576
	Duluth, MN-WI MSA	281,219	+0.17%	280,733	+0.34%	279,771
	Fargo, ND-MN MSA	269,528	+7.88%	249,843	+19.67%	208,777
	Grand Forks, ND-MN MSA	105,046	+0.66%	104,362	+5.99%	98,461
	La Crosse–Onalaska, WI-MN MSA	171,182	+0.49%	170,341	+4.22%	163,438
	Minneapolis–St. Paul–Bloomington, MN-WI MSA	3,790,295	+2.71%	3,690,261	+10.70%	3,333,633
	Sioux Falls, SD-MN MSA	314,638	+9.85%	286,434	+20.18%	238,338
	Wahpeton, ND-MN μSA	23,019	−0.07%	23,035	+0.60%	22,897

The six combined statistical areas of the State of Minnesota (Note: For CSAs comprising populations from multiple states, they are listed twice to show both their intrastate population within that CSA as well as the CSA's total population. Only the intrastate population is ranked.)
2025 rank	Combined statistical area	Population				
2025 rank	Combined statistical area	2025 estimate	Change	2020 Census	Change	2010 Census
1	Minneapolis–St. Paul, MN-WI CSA (MN)	4,046,583	+2.63%	3,943,040	+10.11%	3,580,914
2	Rochester–Austin–Winona, MN CSA	322,678	+2.10%	316,029	+6.23%	297,501
3	Duluth–Grand Rapids, MN-WI CSA (MN)	282,633	+0.42%	281,452	+0.28%	280,670
4	Mankato–New Ulm, MN CSA	130,424	+0.73%	129,478	+5.58%	122,633
5	Fargo–Wahpeton, ND-MN CSA (MN)	74,022	+3.06%	71,824	+9.53%	65,575
6	La Crosse–Onalaska–Sparta, WI-MN CSA (MN)	18,400	−2.35%	18,843	−0.97%	19,027
	Duluth–Grand Rapids, MN-WI CSA	326,623	+0.27%	325,747	+0.28%	324,829
	Fargo–Wahpeton, ND-MN CSA	292,547	+7.21%	272,878	+17.79%	231,674
	La Crosse–Onalaska–Sparta, WI-MN CSA	217,754	+0.53%	216,615	+4.09%	208,111
	Minneapolis–St. Paul, MN-WI CSA	4,188,378	+2.69%	4,078,788	+10.05%	3,706,278

== See also ==
- Geography of Minnesota
  - Demographics of Minnesota
