= Nicollet County, Minnesota =

County in Minnesota, United States

- County
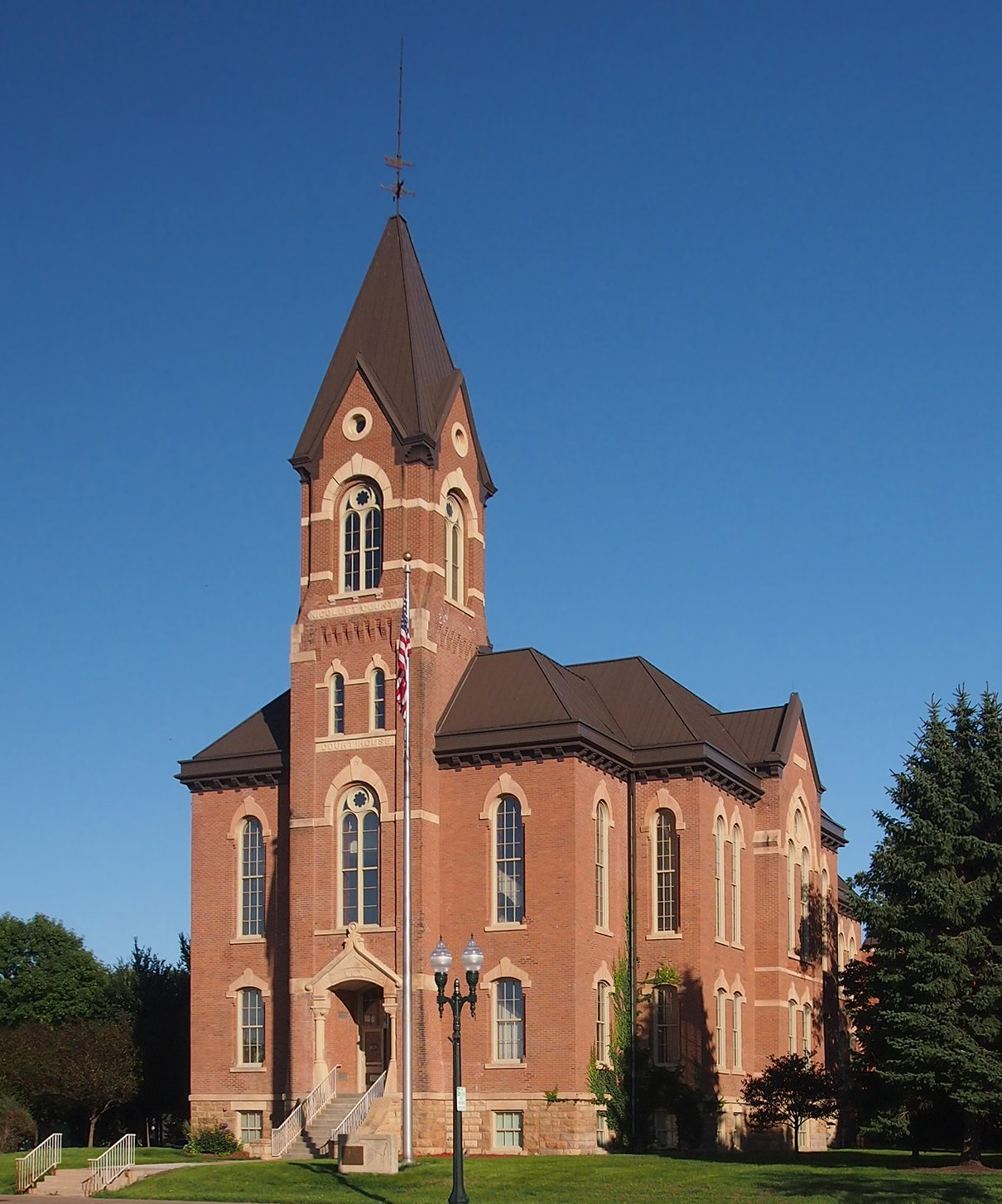
- Nicollet County Courthouse

- Location within the U.S. state of Minnesota
- Coordinates: 44°20′N 94°15′W
- Country: United States
- State: Minnesota
- Founded: March 5, 1853
- Named for: Joseph Nicolas Nicollet
- Seat: St. Peter
- Largest city: North Mankato

Area
  - Total: 467 sq mi (1,210 km^{2})
  - Land: 448 sq mi (1,160 km^{2})
  - Water: 18 sq mi (47 km^{2}) 3.9%

Population (2020)
  - Total: 34,454
  - Estimate (2025): 34,273 ▼
  - Density: 76.9/sq mi (29.7/km^{2})
- Time zone: UTC−6 (Central)
  - Summer (DST): UTC−5 (CDT)
- Congressional district: 1st
- Website: www.nicolletcountymn.gov

Nicollet County (/ˈnɪkəlɪt/ NIH-kə-lit) is a county in the U.S. state of Minnesota. As of the 2020 census, the population was 34,454. Its county seat is St. Peter.

Nicollet County is part of the Mankato–North Mankato Metropolitan Statistical Area.

== History ==
In 1849 the Minnesota Territory legislature defined the boundaries of nine future counties. One of those, Dakota, contained the area north of the Minnesota River where it altered its flow from southeast to northeast. In 1853 the first settler had homesteaded an area on the northeast run of the river, and the following year the settlement of Saint Peter was platted there. Seeing the inflow of settlers into the areas adjoining the river, on March 5, 1853, the territorial legislature partitioned off the lower portion of Dakota County to form a separate entity. It was named for Joseph Nicolas Nicollet (1786-1843), a French explorer whose maps of the area had been instrumental in the territory's development. The county seat was established at Saint Peter.

Significant fighting occurred in the county during the 1862 Dakota War, most notably at the Battle of Fort Ridgely.

== Geography ==
The Minnesota River flows eastward along the southern border of Nicollet County, from its northwestern corner to its northeastern corner, defining the county's southern line. The county terrain consists of low rolling hills, completely devoted to agriculture where possible. The terrain slopes to the east. The county has an area of 467 square miles (1,210 km^{2}), of which 448 square miles (1,160 km^{2}) is land and 18 square miles (47 km^{2}) (3.9%) is water.

Nicollet County's highest point is the lowest high point of all Minnesota counties, with an elevation of 1,065 feet. The county's high point is east of Clear Lake and west of the town of Lafayette.

Soils of Nicollet County

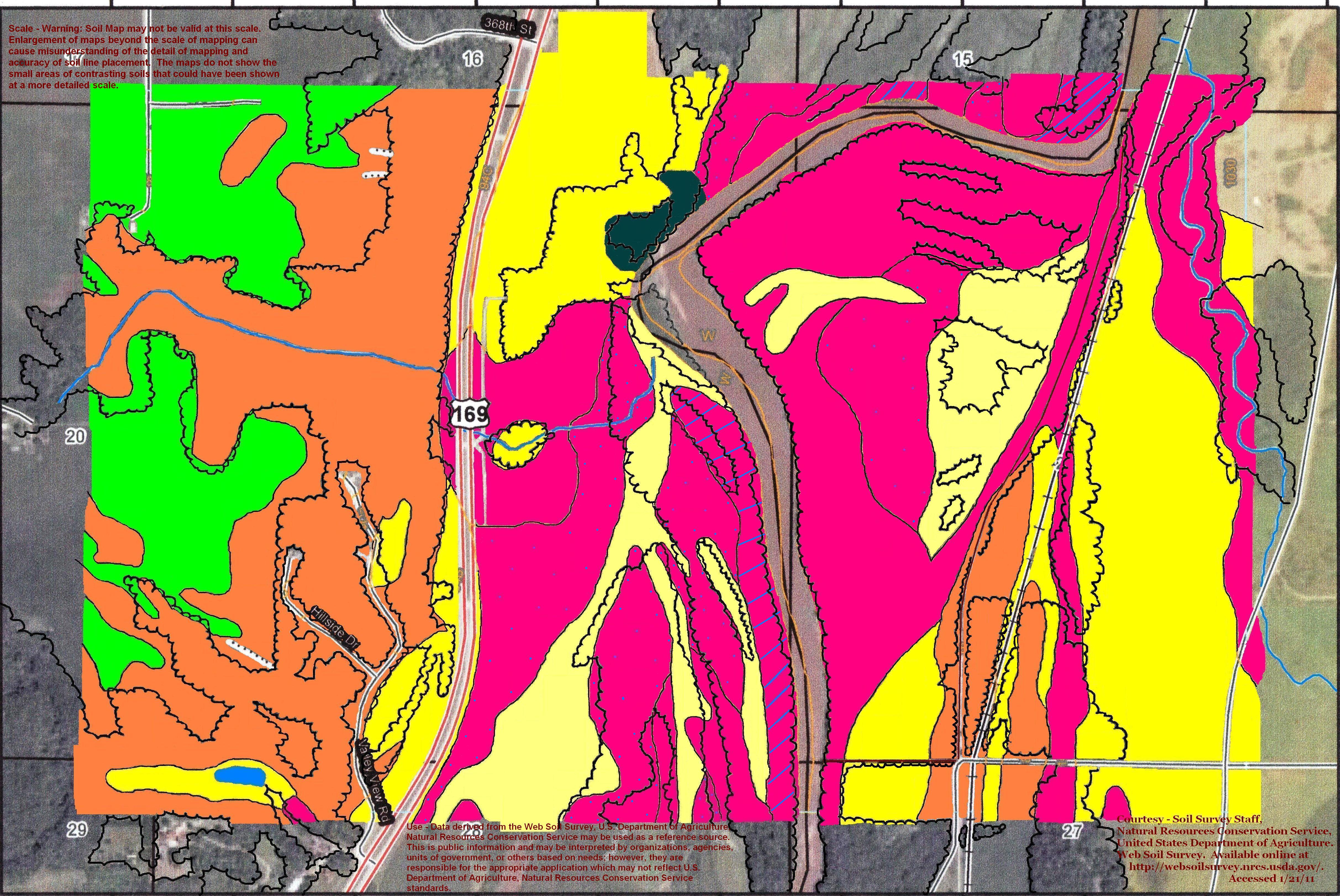
Soils of Chamberlain Woods SNA area

=== Major highways ===
- US Highway 14
- US Highway 169
- Minnesota State Highway 4
- Minnesota State Highway 15
- Minnesota State Highway 22
- Minnesota State Highway 60
- Minnesota State Highway 99
- Minnesota State Highway 111
- List of county roads

=== Adjacent counties ===
- Sibley County - north
- Le Sueur County - east
- Blue Earth County - south
- Brown County - west
- Renville County - northwest

=== Protected areas ===
- Fort Ridgely State Park (part)
- Minneopa State Park (part)
- Seven Mile Creek County Park

=== Lakes ===
- Annexstad Lake
- Erickson Lake
- Middle Lake
- Oak Leaf Lake
- Overson Lake
- Rice Lake
- Sand Lake
- Swan Lake

== Demographics ==
Historical population
Census	Pop.	Note	%±
1860	3,778		—
1870	8,362		121.3%
1880	12,333		47.5%
1890	13,382		8.5%
1900	14,774		10.4%
1910	14,125		−4.4%
1920	15,036		6.4%
1930	16,550		10.1%
1940	18,282		10.5%
1950	20,929		14.5%
1960	23,196		10.8%
1970	24,518		5.7%
1980	26,929		9.8%
1990	28,076		4.3%
2000	29,771		6.0%
2010	32,727		9.9%
2020	34,454		5.3%
2025 (est.)	34,273	▼	−0.5%
U.S. Decennial Census; 1790-1960 1900-1990; 1990-2000 2010-2020

=== Racial and ethnic composition ===
Nicollet County, Minnesota – Racial and ethnic composition Note: the US Census treats Hispanic/Latino as an ethnic category. This table excludes Latinos from the racial categories and assigns them to a separate category. Hispanics/Latinos may be of any race.
Race / Ethnicity (NH = Non-Hispanic)	Pop 1980	Pop 1990	Pop 2000	Pop 2010	Pop 2020	% 1980	% 1990	% 2000	% 2010	% 2020
White alone (NH)	26,562	27,529	28,405	29,944	29,287	98.64%	98.05%	95.41%	91.50%	85.00%
Black or African American alone (NH)	51	84	232	658	1,672	0.19%	0.30%	0.78%	2.01%	4.85%
Native American or Alaska Native alone (NH)	51	54	59	74	141	0.19%	0.19%	0.20%	0.23%	0.41%
Asian alone (NH)	118	198	335	429	558	0.44%	0.71%	1.13%	1.31%	1.62%
Native Hawaiian or Pacific Islander alone (NH)	x	x	5	1	10	x	x	0.02%	0.00%	0.03%
Other race alone (NH)	12	8	8	15	71	0.04%	0.03%	0.03%	0.05%	0.21%
Mixed race or Multiracial (NH)	x	x	192	380	915	x	x	0.64%	1.16%	2.66%
Hispanic or Latino (any race)	135	203	535	1,226	1,800	0.50%	0.72%	1.80%	3.75%	5.22%
Total	26,929	28,076	29,771	32,727	34,454	100.00%	100.00%	100.00%	100.00%	100.00%

=== 2020 census ===
As of the 2020 census, the county had a population of 34,454. The median age was 37.2 years. 22.9% of residents were under the age of 18 and 16.7% of residents were 65 years of age or older. For every 100 females there were 99.6 males, and for every 100 females age 18 and over there were 98.1 males age 18 and over.

The racial makeup of the county was 86.3% White, 5.0% Black or African American, 0.5% American Indian and Alaska Native, 1.6% Asian, <0.1% Native Hawaiian and Pacific Islander, 2.1% from some other race, and 4.4% from two or more races. Hispanic or Latino residents of any race comprised 5.2% of the population.

74.8% of residents lived in urban areas, while 25.2% lived in rural areas.

There were 12,728 households in the county, of which 31.0% had children under the age of 18 living in them. Of all households, 51.6% were married-couple households, 17.7% were households with a male householder and no spouse or partner present, and 23.5% were households with a female householder and no spouse or partner present. About 27.9% of all households were made up of individuals and 11.8% had someone living alone who was 65 years of age or older.

There were 13,371 housing units, of which 4.8% were vacant. Among occupied housing units, 73.0% were owner-occupied and 27.0% were renter-occupied. The homeowner vacancy rate was 1.1% and the rental vacancy rate was 4.8%.

=== 2000 census ===
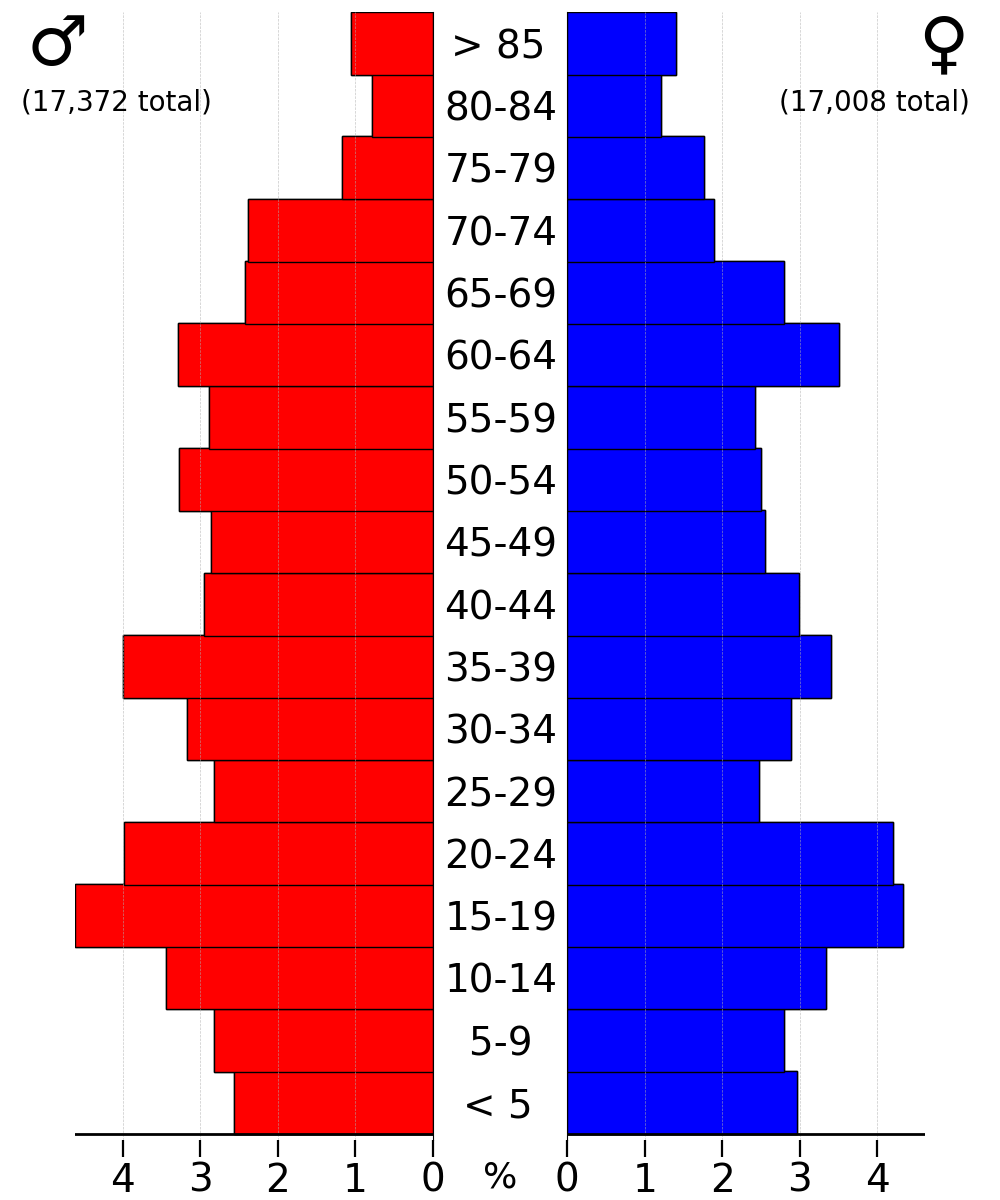
2022 US Census population pyramid for Nicollet County, from ACS 5-year estimates

As of the 2000 census, there were 29,771 people, 10,642 households, and 7,311 families in the county. The population density was 66.5 per square mile (25.7/km^{2}). There were 11,240 housing units at an average density of 25.1 per square mile (9.7/km^{2}). The racial makeup of the county was 96.37% White, 0.80% Black or African American, 0.26% Native American, 1.14% Asian, 0.02% Pacific Islander, 0.65% from other races, and 0.75% from two or more races. 1.80% of the population were Hispanic or Latino of any race. 49.2% were of German, 13.3% Norwegian, 6.8% Swedish and 5.4% Irish ancestry.

There were 10,642 households, out of which 35.30% had children under the age of 18 living with them, 57.50% were married couples living together, 7.90% had a female householder with no husband present, and 31.30% were non-families. 24.00% of all households were made up of individuals, and 8.80% had someone living alone who was 65 years of age or older. The average household size was 2.56 and the average family size was 3.05.

The county population contained 24.70% under the age of 18, 16.40% from 18 to 24, 26.90% from 25 to 44, 21.20% from 45 to 64, and 10.80% who were 65 years of age or older. The median age was 33 years. For every 100 females, there were 99.30 males. For every 100 females age 18 and over, there were 96.90 males.

The median income for a household in the county was $46,170, and the median income for a family was $55,694. Males had a median income of $36,236 versus $25,344 for females. The per capita income for the county was $20,517. About 4.30% of families and 7.50% of the population were below the poverty line, including 6.70% of those under age 18 and 8.00% of those age 65 or over.

== Communities ==
=== Cities ===
- Courtland
- Lafayette
- Mankato (partly in Blue Earth County)
- Nicollet
- North Mankato (partly in Blue Earth County)
- St. Peter (county seat)

=== Unincorporated communities ===
- Bernadotte
- Klossner
- New Sweden
- Norseland
- North Star
- Oshawa
- St. George
- Traverse

=== Ghost town ===
- West Newton

=== Townships ===
- Belgrade Township
- Bernadotte Township
- Brighton Township
- Courtland Township
- Granby Township
- Lafayette Township
- Lake Prairie Township
- New Sweden Township
- Nicollet Township
- Oshawa Township
- Ridgely Township
- Traverse Township
- West Newton Township

== Government and politics ==
Nicollet County has been politically balanced in past decades. Since 1980, the county has selected Democratic and Republican presidential candidates an equal number of times (as of 2024). It has backed the nationwide winner in every election since 1980 except for 2004, and even then, losing Democrat John Kerry only beat incumbent Republican George W. Bush in the county by just 108 votes and a 0.61% margin.

United States presidential election results for Nicollet County, Minnesota
Year	Republican		Democratic		Third party(ies)	
Year	No.	%	No.	%	No.	%
1892	1,098	47.70%	937	40.70%	267	11.60%
1896	1,803	66.41%	837	30.83%	75	2.76%
1900	1,684	64.13%	858	32.67%	84	3.20%
1904	1,677	74.04%	513	22.65%	75	3.31%
1908	1,392	59.28%	832	35.43%	124	5.28%
1912	525	21.64%	929	38.29%	972	40.07%
1916	1,288	58.44%	814	36.93%	102	4.63%
1920	4,115	83.45%	556	11.28%	260	5.27%
1924	2,518	50.05%	287	5.70%	2,226	44.25%
1928	3,628	59.13%	2,466	40.19%	42	0.68%
1932	2,217	35.03%	3,960	62.58%	151	2.39%
1936	2,360	33.70%	4,136	59.06%	507	7.24%
1940	4,674	62.01%	2,832	37.57%	31	0.41%
1944	4,345	64.83%	2,321	34.63%	36	0.54%
1948	3,576	48.82%	3,663	50.01%	86	1.17%
1952	5,775	68.77%	2,584	30.77%	39	0.46%
1956	5,322	66.81%	2,636	33.09%	8	0.10%
1960	5,283	57.08%	3,961	42.80%	11	0.12%
1964	3,605	41.27%	5,121	58.62%	10	0.11%
1968	4,671	50.58%	4,244	45.96%	319	3.45%
1972	6,230	56.28%	4,680	42.28%	159	1.44%
1976	6,071	49.58%	5,777	47.18%	397	3.24%
1980	6,436	47.25%	5,400	39.64%	1,786	13.11%
1984	7,472	55.97%	5,789	43.37%	88	0.66%
1988	6,878	49.92%	6,786	49.25%	115	0.83%
1992	5,091	33.85%	6,055	40.26%	3,893	25.89%
1996	5,057	36.53%	6,772	48.92%	2,013	14.54%
2000	7,221	47.11%	7,041	45.94%	1,065	6.95%
2004	8,689	48.98%	8,797	49.59%	255	1.44%
2008	7,968	43.67%	9,887	54.19%	390	2.14%
2012	8,214	44.75%	9,652	52.58%	491	2.67%
2016	8,437	46.62%	7,886	43.58%	1,774	9.80%
2020	9,018	47.15%	9,622	50.31%	485	2.54%
2024	9,540	49.13%	9,441	48.62%	436	2.25%

County Board of Commissioners
Position	Name	District	Next election
Commissioner and chairperson	Marie Dranttel	District 1	2028
Commissioner	Nicole Helget	District 2	2026
Commissioner	Jack Kolars	District 3	2028
Commissioner	Mark Dehen	District 4	2026
Commissioner	Kurt Zins	District 5	2028

State Legislature (2025-2027)
Position	Name	Affiliation	District
Senate	Nick Frentz	Democrat	18
House of Representatives	Erica Schwartz	Republican	18A
House of Representatives	Luke Frederick	Democrat	18B

U.S Congress (2025-2027)
Position	Name	Affiliation	District
House of Representatives	Brad Finstad	Republican	1st
Senate	Amy Klobuchar	Democrat	N/A
Senate	Tina Smith	Democrat	N/A

== See also ==
- National Register of Historic Places listings in Nicollet County, Minnesota
