= Klossner, Minnesota =

Klossner
- Unincorporated community
- Location within Minnesota Location within the United States
- Coordinates: 44°21′57″N 94°25′33″W
- Country: United States
- State: Minnesota
- County: Nicollet
- Township: Lafayette Township
- Elevation: 1,017 ft (310 m)
- Time zone: UTC-6 (Central (CST))
  - Summer (DST): UTC-5 (CDT)
- ZIP code: 56073 and 56054
- Area code: 507
- GNIS feature ID: 646195

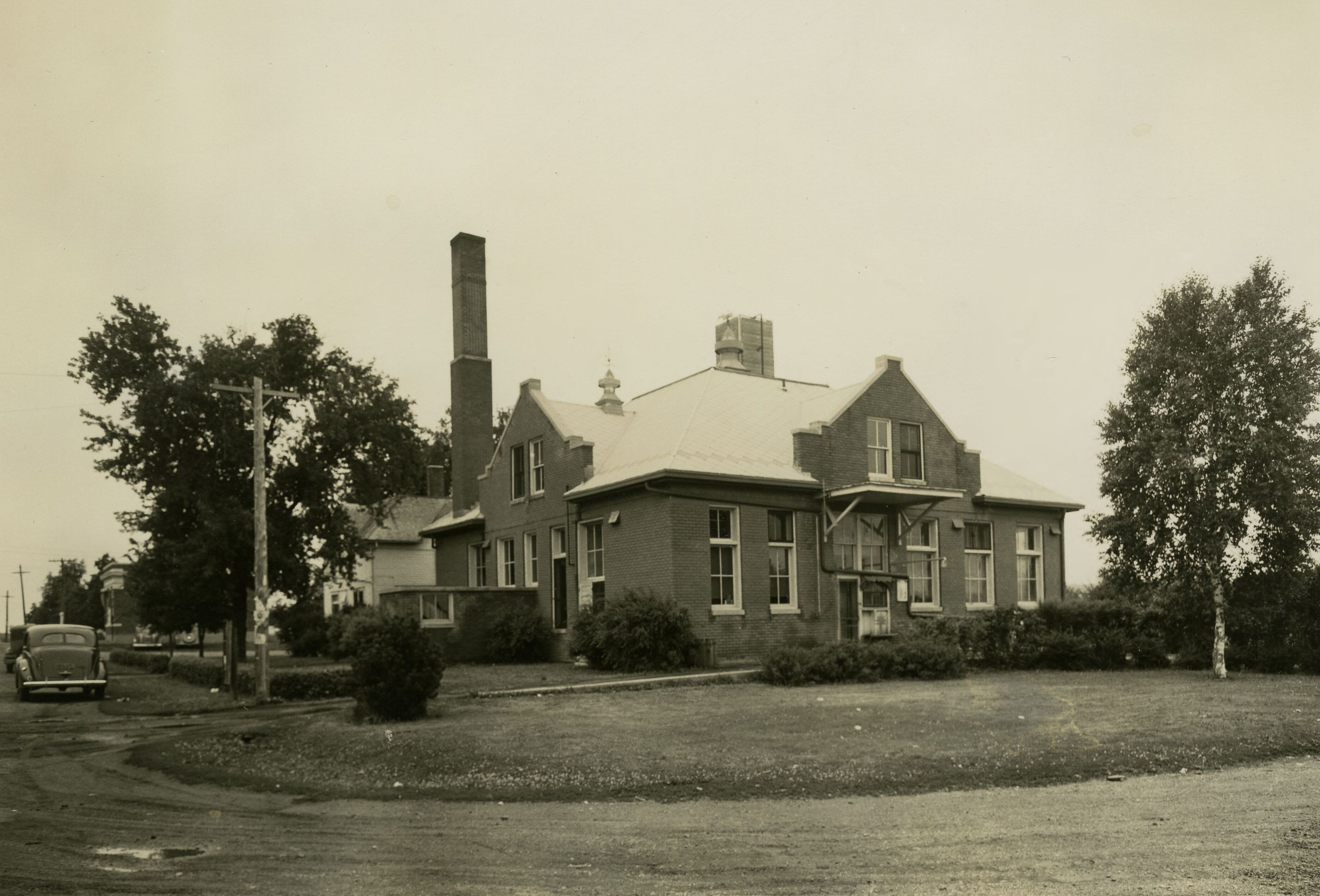
Klossner Creamery, Nicollet County, Minnesota, c.1940.

Klossner is an unincorporated community in Lafayette Township, Nicollet County, Minnesota, United States, near New Ulm. The community is located near the junction of Nicollet County Road 5 and State Highway 15 (MN 15). Fritsche Creek flows nearby.

Klossner was platted in 1897, and named for its founder, Jacob Klossner. A post office had been in operation at Klossner since 1896 but was closed on May 1, 1985.
