= North Star, Minnesota =

North Star
- Unincorporated community
- Location within Minnesota Location within the United States
- Coordinates: 44°17′26″N 94°04′46″W
- Country: United States
- State: Minnesota
- County: Nicollet
- Township: Oshawa Township
- Elevation: 984 ft (300 m)
- Time zone: UTC-6 (Central (CST))
  - Summer (DST): UTC-5 (CDT)
- ZIP code: 56082
- Area code: 507
- GNIS feature ID: 654851

North Star is an unincorporated community in Oshawa Township, Nicollet County, Minnesota, United States, near St. Peter. The community is located near the junction of Nicollet County Road 13 and State Highway 99 (MN 99). Seven Mile Creek flows nearby.
