= North Mankato, Minnesota =

City in Minnesota, United States

- City
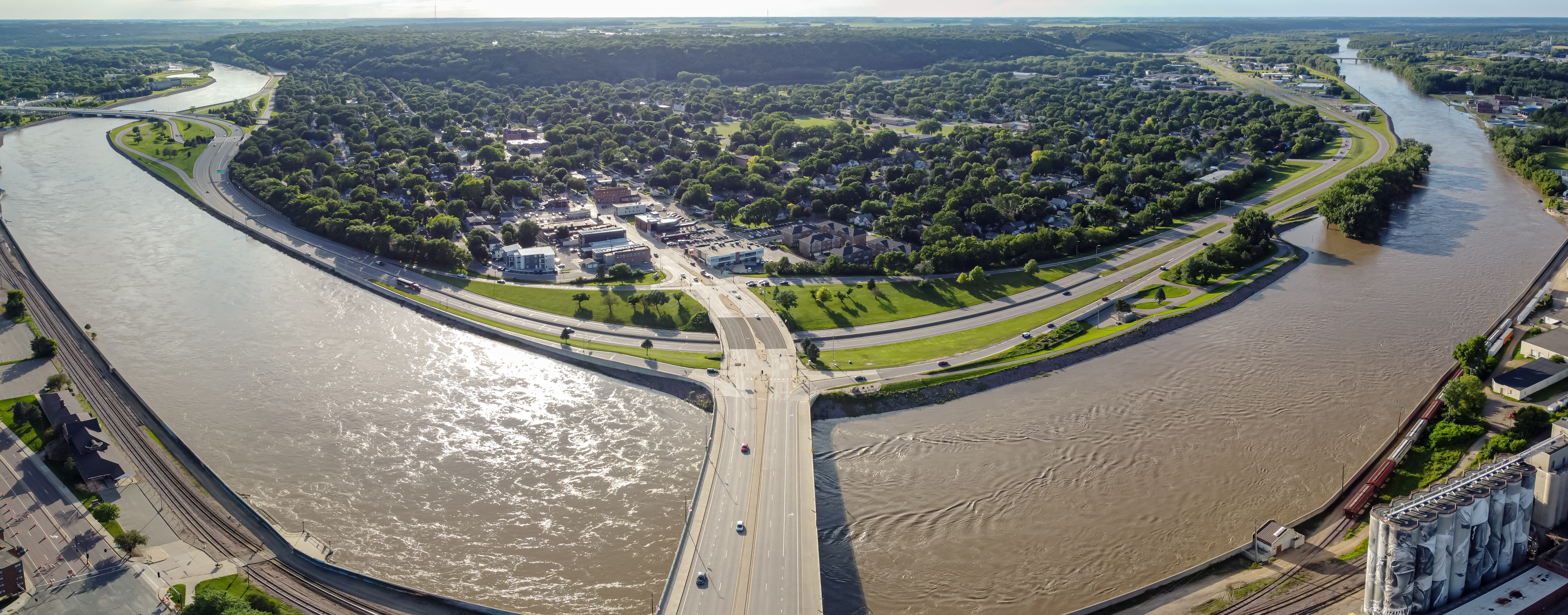
- Minnesota River and Belgrade Avenue

- Location of North Mankato, Minnesota
- Coordinates: 44°10′53.14″N 94°02′19.53″W
- Country: United States
- State: Minnesota
- Counties: Nicollet, Blue Earth
- Metro: Mankato–North Mankato
- Founded: 1857
- Incorporated: December 19, 1898

Government
  - Type: Mayor–Council
  - Mayor: Scott Carlson
  - Councilmembers: Sandra Oachs; Matt Peterson; Billy Steiner; James Whitlock

Area
  - City: 6.551 sq mi (16.967 km^{2})
  - Land: 6.437 sq mi (16.672 km^{2})
  - Water: 0.114 sq mi (0.296 km^{2})
- Elevation: 994 ft (303 m)

Population (2020)
  - City: 14,275
  - Estimate (2023): 14,091
  - Density: 2,189/sq mi (845.2/km^{2})
  - Urban: 57,584 (US: 456th)
  - Metro: 104,248 (US: 352nd)
- Time zone: UTC–6 (Central (CST))
  - Summer (DST): UTC–5 (CDT)
- ZIP Codes: 56002, 56003
- Area codes: 507 and 924
- FIPS code: 27-47068
- GNIS feature ID: 2395257
- Sales tax: 7.875%
- Website: northmankato.com

North Mankato (/mænˈkeɪtoʊ/ man-KAY-toh) is a city in Nicollet and Blue Earth Counties, Minnesota, United States. The population was 14,275 at the 2020 census. North Mankato is situated on the north bank of the Minnesota River, across from the larger city of Mankato.

Most of North Mankato is in Nicollet County, but a small part extends into Blue Earth County. It is neighbored to the south across the Minnesota River by Mankato. The two cities have a combined population of 58,763. North Mankato is the second largest city in the Mankato, MN Metropolitan Statistical Area (MSA) and was listed as a principal city of the MSA until September 2018.

North Mankato was incorporated as a village on December 19, 1898. U.S. Highways 14 and 169 and Minnesota State Highway 60 are three of the city's main routes.

== Geography ==
North Mankato is located at 44°10′53.14″N 94°02′19.53″W (44.1814264, -94.0387596).

According to the United States Census Bureau, the city has a total area of 6.551 square miles (16.97 km^{2}), of which, 6.437 square miles (16.67 km^{2}) is land and 0.114 square miles (0.30 km^{2}) is water.

== Demographics ==
Historical population
| Census | Pop. | Note | %± |
|---|---|---|---|
| 1900 | 939 | | — |
| 1910 | 1,279 | | 36.2% |
| 1920 | 1,840 | | 43.9% |
| 1930 | 2,822 | | 53.4% |
| 1940 | 3,517 | | 24.6% |
| 1950 | 4,788 | | 36.1% |
| 1960 | 5,927 | | 23.8% |
| 1970 | 7,347 | | 24.0% |
| 1980 | 9,145 | | 24.5% |
| 1990 | 10,164 | | 11.1% |
| 2000 | 11,798 | | 16.1% |
| 2010 | 13,394 | | 13.5% |
| 2020 | 14,275 | | 6.6% |
| 2023 (est.) | 14,091 | | −1.3% |
U.S. Decennial Census; 2020 Census

=== Racial and ethnic composition ===
North Mankato, Minnesota – racial and ethnic composition Note: the US Census treats Hispanic/Latino as an ethnic category. This table excludes Latinos from the racial categories and assigns them to a separate category. Hispanics/Latinos may be of any race.
| Race / ethnicity (NH = non-Hispanic) | Pop. 2000 | Pop. 2010 | Pop. 2020 | % 2000 | % 2010 | % 2020 |
|---|---|---|---|---|---|---|
| White alone (NH) | 11,266 | 12,320 | 12,125 | 95.49% | 91.98% | 84.94% |
| Black or African American alone (NH) | 71 | 270 | 789 | 0.60% | 2.02% | 5.53% |
| Native American or Alaska Native alone (NH) | 25 | 22 | 37 | 0.21% | 0.16% | 0.26% |
| Asian alone (NH) | 162 | 227 | 242 | 1.37% | 1.69% | 1.70% |
| Pacific Islander alone (NH) | 3 | 1 | 1 | 0.03% | 0.01% | 0.01% |
| Other race alone (NH) | 3 | 8 | 45 | 0.03% | 0.06% | 0.32% |
| Mixed race or multiracial (NH) | 80 | 146 | 439 | 0.68% | 1.09% | 3.08% |
| Hispanic or Latino (any race) | 188 | 400 | 597 | 1.59% | 2.99% | 4.18% |
| Total | 11,798 | 13,394 | 14,275 | 100.00% | 100.00% | 100.00% |

=== 2020 census ===
As of the 2020 census, North Mankato had a population of 14,275, with 5,877 households and 3,647 families. The population density was 2,337.1 inhabitants per square mile (902.4/km^{2}). There were 6,147 housing units at an average density of 1,006.4 per square mile (388.6/km^{2}).

The median age was 37.9 years. 24.7% of residents were under the age of 18, 6.7% were under the age of 5, and 16.9% were 65 years of age or older. The gender makeup of the city was 48.1% male and 51.9% female. For every 100 females, there were 96.5 males; for every 100 females age 18 and over, there were 95.0 males.

Of the city's households, 30.8% had children under the age of 18 living in them. Of all households, 48.1% were married-couple households, 19.1% were households with a male householder and no spouse or partner present, and 25.1% were households with a female householder and no spouse or partner present. About 30.2% of all households were made up of individuals, and 12.1% had someone living alone who was 65 years of age or older.

In total, 4.4% of housing units were vacant, with a homeowner vacancy rate of 0.9% and a rental vacancy rate of 5.5%. 99.9% of residents lived in urban areas and 0.1% lived in rural areas.

=== Demographic estimates ===
As of the 2022 American Community Survey, there are 5,923 estimated households in North Mankato with an average of 2.38 persons per household. The city has a median household income of $74,602. Approximately 8.7% of the city's population lives at or below the poverty line. North Mankato has an estimated 72.3% employment rate, with 43.3% of the population holding a bachelor's degree or higher and 97.5% holding a high school diploma.

The top five reported ancestries (people were allowed to report up to two ancestries, thus the figures will generally add to more than 100%) were English (97.2%), Spanish (1.2%), Indo-European (0.8%), Asian and Pacific Islander (0.2%), and Other (0.6%).

The median age in the city was 37.4 years.

=== 2010 census ===
As of the 2010 census, there were 13,394 people, 5,580 households, and 3,553 families residing in the city. The population density was 2,283.1 inhabitants per square mile (881.5/km^{2}). There were 5,864 housing units at an average density of 999.0 per square mile (385.7/km^{2}). The racial makeup of the city was 93.89% White, 2.07% African American, 0.22% Native American, 1.70% Asian, 0.01% Pacific Islander, 0.81% from some other races and 1.31% from two or more races. Hispanic or Latino people of any race were 2.99% of the population.

There were 5,580 households, of which 31.2% had children under the age of 18 living with them, 50.0% were married couples living together, 9.8% had a female householder with no husband present, 3.9% had a male householder with no wife present, and 36.3% were non-families. 27.6% of all households were made up of individuals, and 9.2% had someone living alone who was 65 years of age or older. The average household size was 2.39 and the average family size was 2.92.

The median age in the city was 35.5 years. 23.7% of residents were under the age of 18; 10.1% were between the ages of 18 and 24; 27.8% were from 25 to 44; 26.3% were from 45 to 64; and 11.9% were 65 years of age or older. The gender makeup of the city was 49.3% male and 50.7% female.

=== 2000 census ===
As of the 2000 census, there were 11,798 people, 4,744 households, and 3,178 families residing in the city. The population density was 2,502.5 inhabitants per square mile (966.2/km^{2}). There were 5,046 housing units at an average density of 1,070.3 per square mile (413.2/km^{2}). The racial makeup of the city was 96.47% White, 0.65% African American, 0.24% Native American, 1.38% Asian, 0.03% Pacific Islander, 0.44% from some other races and 0.79% from two or more races. Hispanic or Latino people of any race were 1.59% of the population.

There were 4,744 households, out of which 35.7% had children under the age of 18 living with them, 55.0% were married couples living together, 9.0% had a female householder with no husband present, and 33.0% were non-families. 24.7% of all households were made up of individuals, and 7.3% had someone living alone who was 65 years of age or older. The average household size was 2.48 and the average family size was 2.99.

In the city, the population was spread out, with 26.3% under the age of 18, 10.9% from 18 to 24, 30.6% from 25 to 44, 22.5% from 45 to 64, and 9.6% who were 65 years of age or older. The median age was 33 years. For every 100 females, there were 96.1 males. For every 100 females age 18 and over, there were 93.1 males.

The median income for a household in the city was $48,816, and the median income for a family was $59,265. Males had a median income of $38,720 versus $25,713 for females. The per capita income for the city was $23,916. About 5.3% of families and 7.0% of the population were below the poverty line, including 7.8% of those under age 18 and 7.2% of those age 65 or over.

== Politics ==
Presidential election results 1960–2020

Precinct General Election Results
| Year | Republican | Democratic | Third parties |
|---|---|---|---|
| 2020 | 43.5% 3,615 | 53.8% 4,470 | 2.7% 219 |
| 2016 | 43.9% 3,361 | 46.1% 3,528 | 10.0% 765 |
| 2012 | 44.2% 3,418 | 53.3% 4,123 | 2.5% 192 |
| 2008 | 43.0% 3,304 | 55.0% 4,232 | 2.0% 156 |
| 2004 | 48.2% 3,608 | 50.5% 3,772 | 1.3% 99 |
| 2000 | 48.5% 3,064 | 45.6% 2,879 | 5.9% 270 |
| 1996 | 39.4% 2,144 | 48.3% 2,623 | 12.3% 669 |
| 1992 | 36.1% 2,128 | 39.9% 2,348 | 24.0% 1,415 |
| 1988 | 50.3% 2,544 | 49.7% 2,513 | 0.0% 0 |
| 1984 | 54.4% 2,539 | 45.6% 2,129 | 0.0% 0 |
| 1980 | 45.0% 2,024 | 42.5% 1,915 | 12.5% 562 |
| 1976 | 48.8% 1,919 | 48.5%' 1,908 | 2.7% 108 |
| 1972 | 55.7% 1,927 | 42.9% 1,484 | 1.4% 47 |
| 1968 | 44.1% 1,333 | 52.5% 1,586 | 3.4% 101 |
| 1964 | 39.5% 991 | 60.4% 1,517 | 0.1% 4 |
| 1960 | 56.4% 1,587 | 53.4% 1,223 | 0.2% 5 |

== Education ==
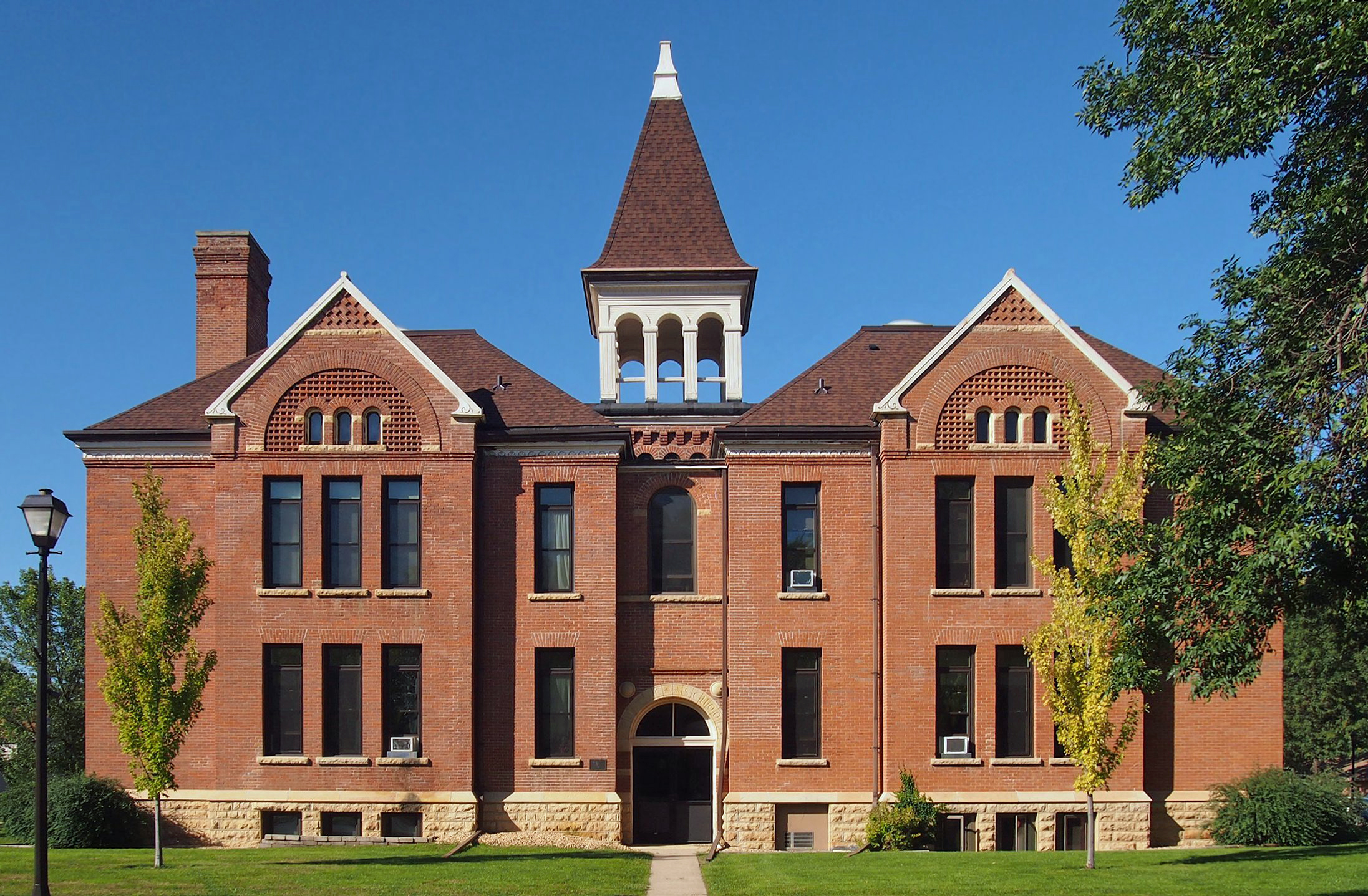
The old North Mankato Public School building, now Belltower Apartments, is listed on the National Register of Historic Places

North Mankato has multiple schools within its borders, including six public schools:

- Bridges Community School
- Dakota Meadows Middle School
- Futures Program
- Futures Sun
- Hoover Elementary School
- Monroe Elementary School

=== Higher Education ===
- South Central College

== Corporations ==
- Angie's Artisan Treats
- Taylor Corporation
