= Minnesota State Highway 111 =

State highway in Minnesota, United States

Trunk Highway 111
- MN 111 highlighted in red

Route information
- Maintained by MnDOT
- Length: 9.789 mi (15.754 km)
- Existed: April 22, 1933–present

Major junctions
- South end: US 14 at Nicollet
- MN 99 at Nicollet
- North end: MN 22 at New Sweden Township

Location
- Country: United States
- State: Minnesota
- Counties: Nicollet

Highway system
- Minnesota Trunk Highway System; Interstate; US; State; Legislative; Scenic
← MN 110	→ MN 112

Minnesota State Highway 111 (MN 111) is a short 9.789-mile-long (15.754 km) highway in south-central Minnesota, which runs from its intersection with U.S. Highway 14 in Nicollet and continues north to its northern terminus at its intersection with State Highway 22 in New Sweden Township.

== Route description ==
Highway 111 serves as a north–south route in south-central Minnesota between the cities of Nicollet and Gaylord.

Highway 111 is also known as Main Street in the city of Nicollet.

The route is legally defined as Route 122 in the Minnesota Statutes. It is not marked with this number.

== History ==
Highway 111 was authorized on April 22, 1933.

The route was paved by 1960.

== Major intersections ==
The entire route is in Nicollet County.

Location	mi	km	Destinations	Notes
Nicollet	0.000	0.000	US 14 – Mankato, New Ulm CSAH 23 south	
Nicollet	0.329	0.529	MN 99 east – St. Peter	
New Sweden Township	9.798	15.768	MN 22 – Gaylord, St. Peter	
1.000 mi = 1.609 km; 1.000 km = 0.621 mi
