= Nicollet, Minnesota =

City in Minnesota, United States

Nicollet
- City
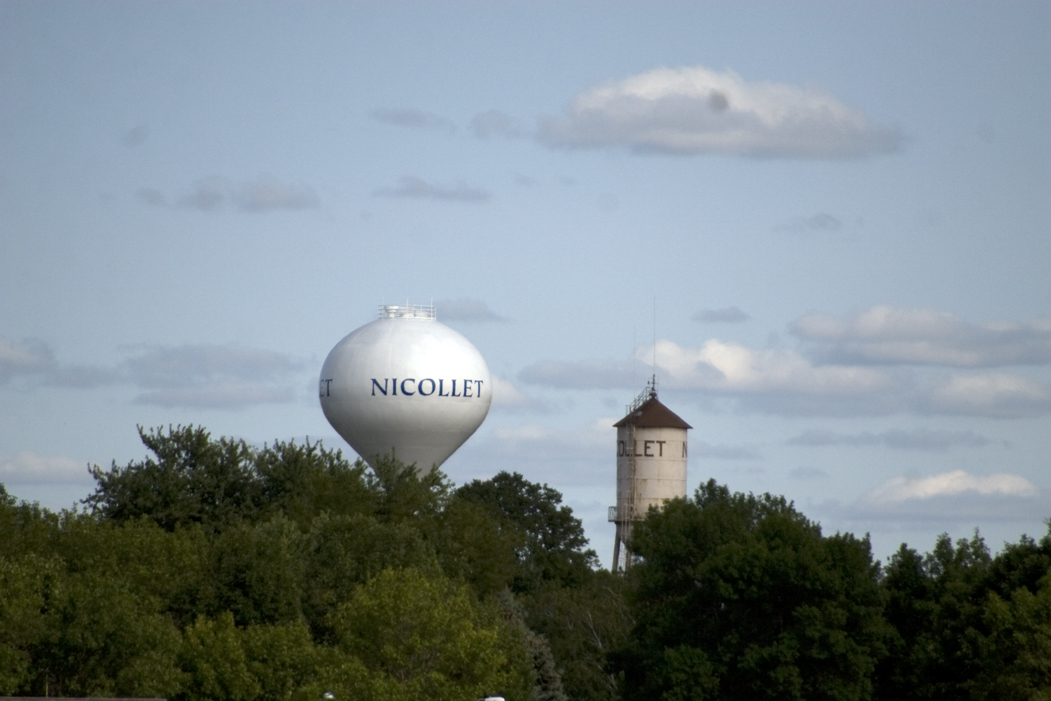
- Nicollet's old and new water towers

- Location of Nicollet, Minnesota
- Coordinates: 44°16′29″N 94°11′17″W
- Country: United States
- State: Minnesota
- County: Nicollet

Government
  - Type: Mayor - Council
  - Mayor: Fred Froehlich

Area
  - Total: 0.91 sq mi (2.35 km^{2})
  - Land: 0.91 sq mi (2.35 km^{2})
  - Water: 0 sq mi (0.00 km^{2})
- Elevation: 988 ft (301 m)

Population (2020)
  - Total: 1,143
  - Density: 1,261/sq mi (486.7/km^{2})
- Time zone: UTC-6 (Central (CST))
  - Summer (DST): UTC-5 (CDT)
- ZIP code: 56074
- Area code: 507
- FIPS code: 27-46150
- GNIS feature ID: 2395233
- Website: nicollet.org

Nicollet (/ˈnɪkəlɪt/ NIH-kə-lit) is a city in Nicollet County, Minnesota, United States. The population was 1,143 at the 2020 census. It is part of the Mankato, MN Metropolitan Statistical Area.

U.S. Route 14 and Minnesota State Highways 99 and 111 are the three main arterial routes in the community. Nearby Swan Lake Wildlife Management Area is one of the most significant waterfowl breeding areas in the upper Midwest.

== History ==
The city of Nicollet was named for Joseph Nicollet, a French explorer. A post office called Nicollet, along with the town of Nicollet, was established in 1858 by William A. Mills. Nicollet was platted on June 30, 1874 by James H. Stewart and Walter L. Brackenridge as a railroad town. Nicollet was incorporated in 1881.

== Geography ==
According to the U.S. Census Bureau, the city has a total area of 0.94 square miles (2.43 km^{2}), all land.

== Demographics ==
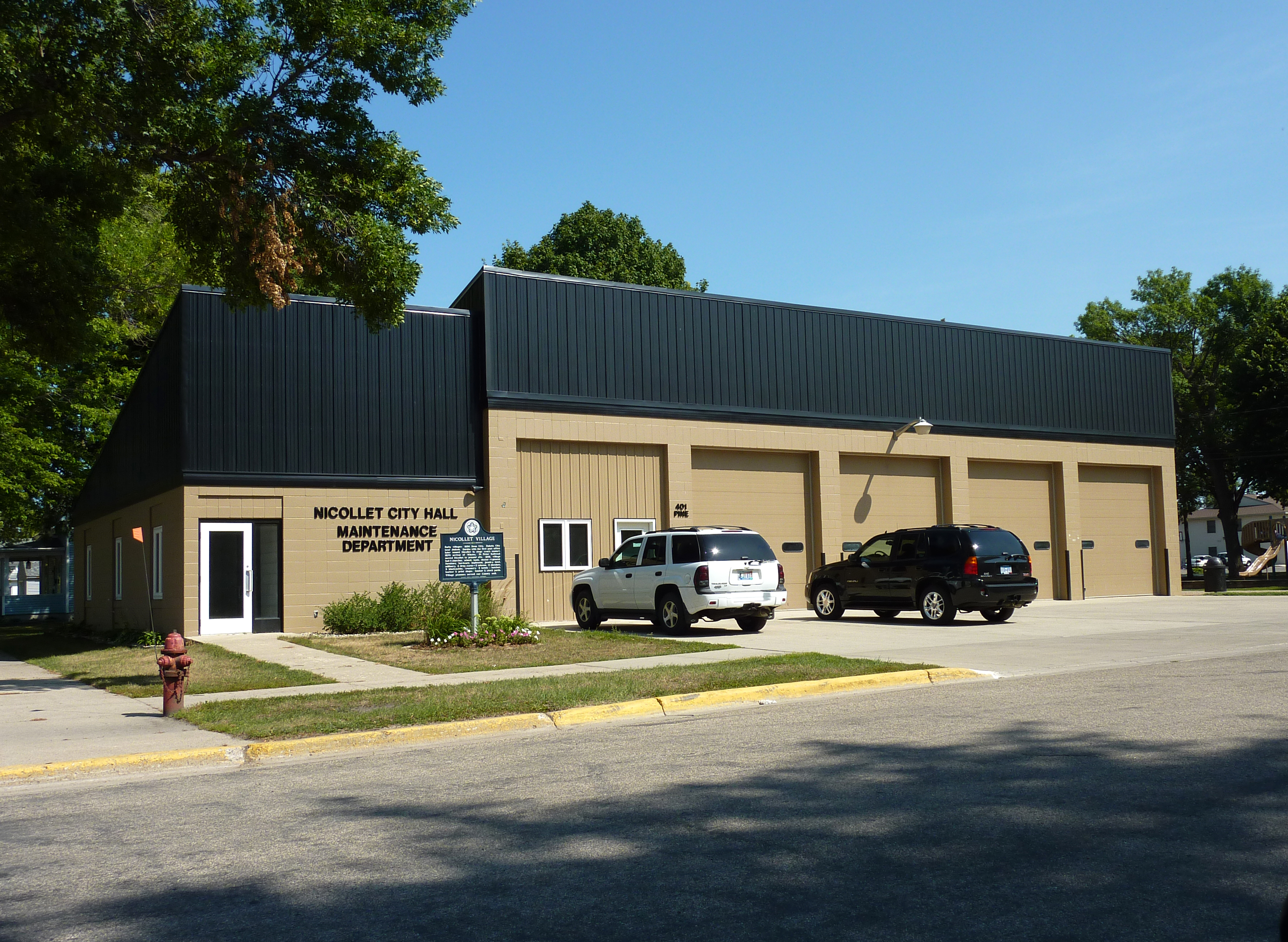
Nicollet City Hall

Historical population
Census	Pop.	Note	%±
1880	99		—
1890	263		165.7%
1900	330		25.5%
1910	338		2.4%
1920	404		19.5%
1930	434		7.4%
1940	434		0.0%
1950	493		13.6%
1960	493		0.0%
1970	618		25.4%
1980	709		14.7%
1990	795		12.1%
2000	889		11.8%
2010	1,093		22.9%
2020	1,143		4.6%
U.S. Decennial Census; 2020 Census

=== 2010 census ===
As of the census of 2010, there were 1,093 people, 429 households, and 307 families living in the city. The population density was 1,162.8 inhabitants per square mile (449.0/km^{2}). There were 445 housing units at an average density of 473.4 per square mile (182.8/km^{2}). The racial makeup of the city was 98.4% White, 0.2% African American, 0.2% Asian, 0.1% from other races, and 1.1% from two or more races. Hispanic or Latino of any race were 3.4% of the population.

There were 429 households, of which 39.9% had children under the age of 18 living with them, 55.9% were married couples living together, 11.0% had a female householder with no husband present, 4.7% had a male householder with no wife present, and 28.4% were non-families. 23.5% of all households were made up of individuals, and 7.9% had someone living alone who was 65 years of age or older. The average household size was 2.55 and the average family size was 3.00.

The median age in the city was 31.9 years. 29.8% of residents were under the age of 18; 7.8% were between the ages of 18 and 24; 30% were from 25 to 44; 22.4% were from 45 to 64; and 10.1% were 65 years of age or older. The gender makeup of the city was 49.8% male and 50.2% female.

=== 2000 census ===
As of the census of 2000, there were 889 people, 344 households, and 241 families living in the city. The population density was 1,008.2 inhabitants per square mile (389.3/km^{2}). There were 350 housing units at an average density of 396.9 per square mile (153.2/km^{2}). The racial makeup of the city was 98.20% White, 0.11% African American, 0.34% Native American, 0.34% Asian, and 1.01% from two or more races. Hispanic or Latino of any race were 0.90% of the population.

There were 344 households, out of which 36.3% had children under the age of 18 living with them, 58.1% were married couples living together, 7.3% had a female householder with no husband present, and 29.9% were non-families. 25.3% of all households were made up of individuals, and 10.2% had someone living alone who was 65 years of age or older. The average household size was 2.58 and the average family size was 3.12.

In the city, the population was spread out, with 28.1% under the age of 18, 8.3% from 18 to 24, 31.4% from 25 to 44, 21.0% from 45 to 64, and 11.1% who were 65 years of age or older. The median age was 34 years. For every 100 females, there were 104.4 males. For every 100 females age 18 and over, there were 102.9 males.

The median income for a household in the city was $42,500, and the median income for a family was $51,563. Males had a median income of $34,722 versus $22,500 for females. The per capita income for the city was $19,237. About 1.3% of families and 3.7% of the population were below the poverty line, including 2.2% of those under age 18 and 3.4% of those age 65 or over.
