= St. George, Minnesota =

St. George
- Unincorporated community
- Location within Minnesota Location within the United States
- Coordinates: 44°23′22″N 94°31′57″W
- Country: United States
- State: Minnesota
- County: Nicollet
- Township: West Newton Township
- Elevation: 984 ft (300 m)
- Time zone: UTC-6 (Central (CST))
  - Summer (DST): UTC-5 (CDT)
- ZIP code: 56073
- Area code: 507
- GNIS feature ID: 654924

St. George is an unincorporated community in West Newton Township, Nicollet County, Minnesota, United States, near New Ulm. The community is located near the junction of Nicollet County Roads 5 and 16.

A post office called Saint George was established in 1894, and remained in operation until 1904.
