= U.S. Route 14 =

Numbered Highway in the United States

U.S. Route 14
- US 14 highlighted in red

Route information
- Length: 1,445.32 mi (2,326.02 km)
- Existed: 1926–present

Major junctions
- West end: US 16 / US 20 at Yellowstone National Park, WY
- I-90 / US 87 at Sheridan, WY; US 83 at Pierre, SD; I-29 at Brookings, SD; I-35 at Owatonna, MN; I-90 at La Crescent, MN; US 12 / US 18 / US 151 at Madison, WI; I-39 / I-90 at Janesville, WI; I-43 at Darien, WI; US 12 / US 45 at Des Plaines, IL; I-94 at Chicago, IL
- East end: US 41 at Chicago, IL

Location
- Country: United States
- States: Wyoming, South Dakota, Minnesota, Wisconsin, Illinois

Highway system
- United States Numbered Highway System; List; Special; Divided
← US 13	→ US 15

U.S. Route 14 or U.S. Highway 14 (US 14), an east–west route, is one of the original United States Numbered Highways of 1926. It is about 1,445 miles (2,326 km) long. It is roughly parallel to Interstate 90 (I-90).

The highway's eastern terminus is in Chicago, Illinois. Its western terminus is the east entrance of Yellowstone National Park in Wyoming, with the western terminus of US 16 and the western terminus of the eastern segment of US 20.

== Route description ==
Lengths
	mi	km
WY	449.21	722.93
SD	439.75	707.71
MN	288.319	464.004
WI	198.49	319.44
IL	69.55	111.93
Total	1,445.32	2,326.02

=== Wyoming ===
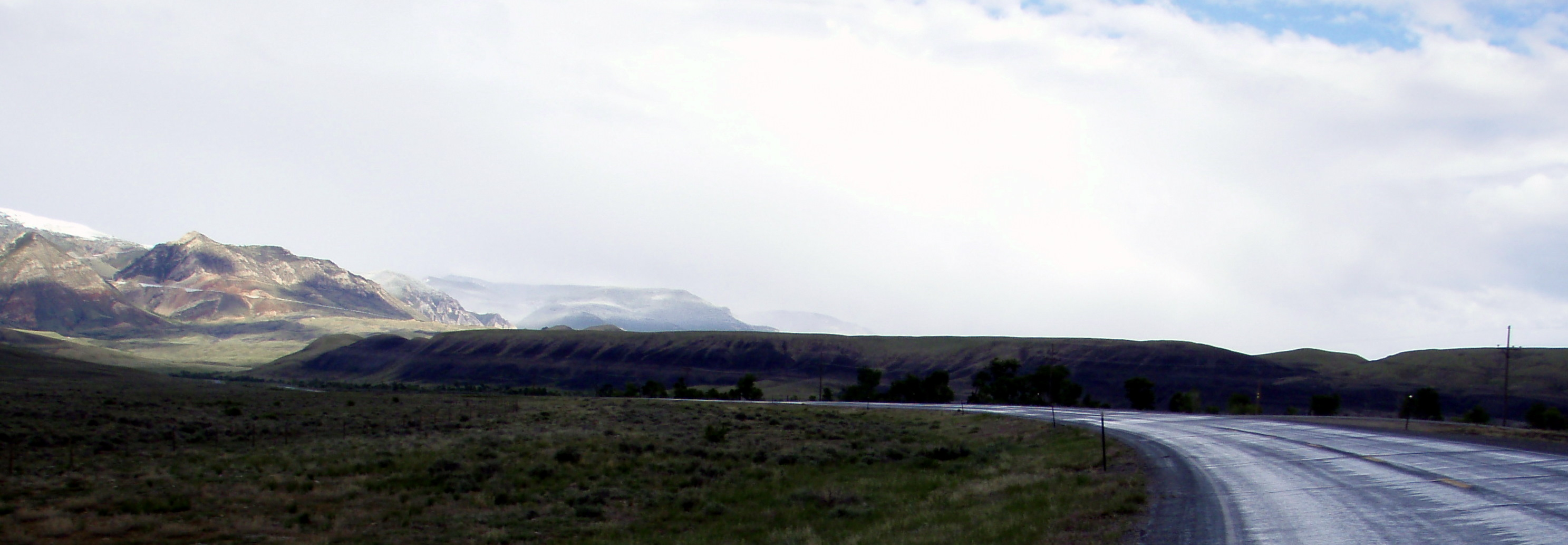
US 14 in Wyoming facing the Bighorn Mountains from the west

US 14 begins at the east entrance to Yellowstone National Park, along with US 16 and the eastern segment of US 20. It travels through Shoshone National Forest to Cody, where US 14A splits off to the north. Both routes traverse the dry Bighorn Basin, followed by a steep ascent up the Bighorn Mountains and through the Bighorn National Forest, where they rejoin at Burgess Junction. The highway descends the eastern slope of the Bighorn Mountains between Burgess Junction and Dayton. US 14 briefly follows I-90 south from Ranchester to Sheridan. The highway turns east and then south to again join I-90 near Gillette. It splits off for a short time to Carlile, then rejoins I-90 which it follows to the state line.

=== South Dakota ===
The South Dakota section of US 14 enters the state from Wyoming concurrent with I-90. It passes through Spearfish, Sturgis, Rapid City, and Wall, before leaving I-90. US 14 then passes through Philip, Midland, Pierre, Highmore, Miller, Wolsey, Huron, De Smet, Arlington, Volga, South Dakota, and Brookings, then leaving the state at the Minnesota state line.

US 14A winds through the northern part of the scenic Black Hills taking travelers from Sturgis to Spearfish.

The Laura Ingalls Wilder Historic Highway incorporates US 14 from De Smet in the west to Rochester, Minnesota, in the east.

US 14 and US 83 serve Pierre, one of only four state capitals not on the Interstate Highway System.

The South Dakota section of US 14 is legally defined at South Dakota Codified Laws § 31-4-134.

=== Minnesota ===
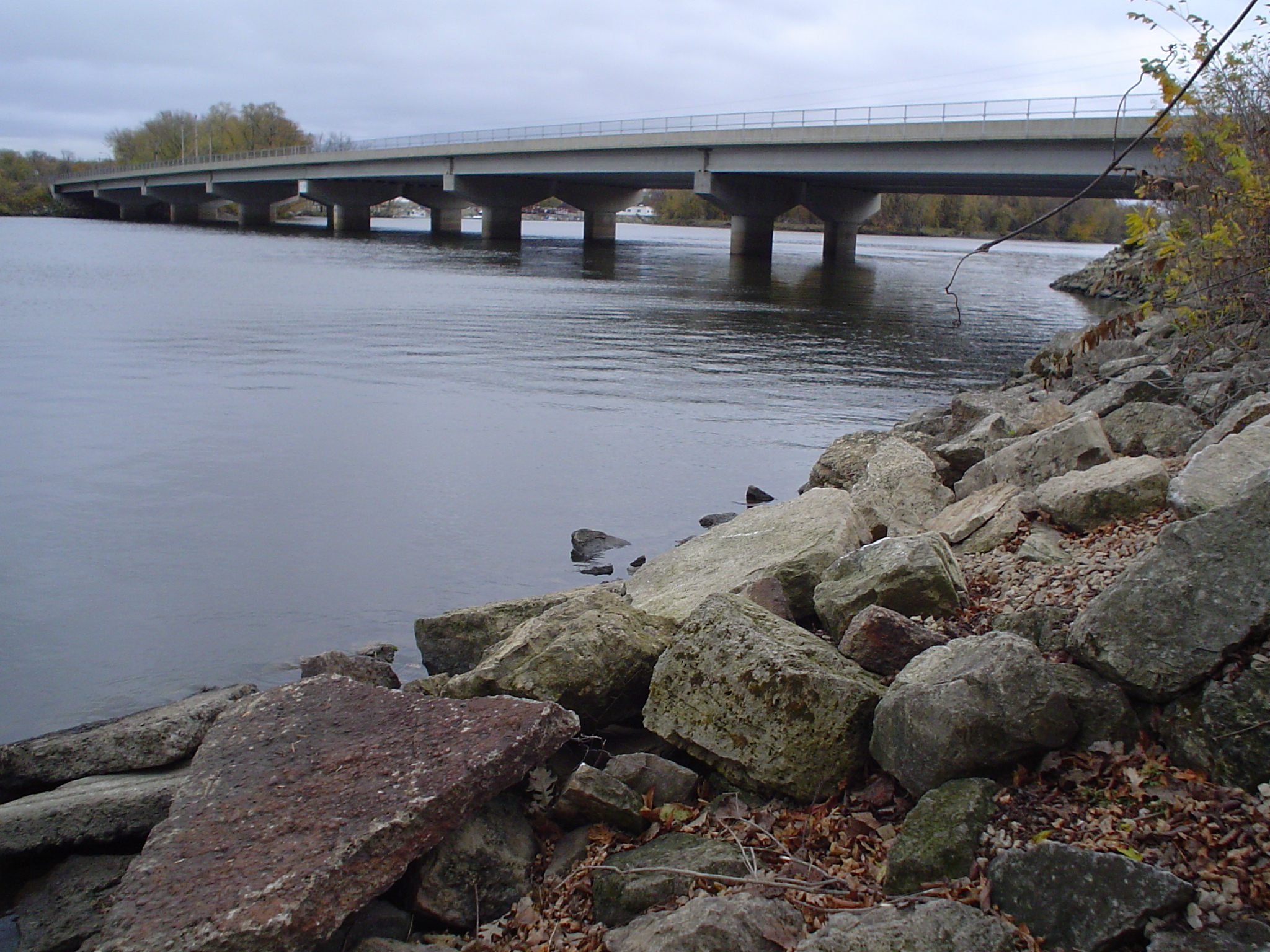
The La Crosse West Channel Bridge carrying US 14, US 61, MN 16, and State Trunk Highway 16 across the Mississippi River between La Crescent, Minnesota, and La Crosse, Wisconsin. This is the river's West Channel.

US 14 enters the state from South Dakota west of Lake Benton. It goes east through several small towns such as Balaton, Tracy, Revere, Lamberton, Sanborn, and Sleepy Eye, on a two-lane road until New Ulm, where it is briefly a divided highway. From New Ulm to Mankato, the highway lies north of the Minnesota River. Shortly before coming to the Mankato – North Mankato metropolitan area, US 14 becomes a freeway bypass, which becomes an expressway east of Mankato. This section is part of the Laura Ingalls Wilder Historic Highway as it passes through Walnut Grove. It currently continues east south of Waseca, and, at Owatonna, it crosses I-35 at a cloverleaf interchange. It then heads east toward Rochester, with an expressway segment beginning at Minnesota State Highway 56 (MN 56) and continuing east into Rochester. Once it enters Rochester, it has a concurrency with US 52. After the concurrency, it continues through Rochester as a divided highway. After Rochester, the highway parallels I-90 until Winona, where US 14 gets picked up by US 61. The two highways run concurrently the rest of the way in Minnesota and cross the Mississippi River at La Crescent over the La Crosse West Channel Bridge.

US 14 was extended to a full, limited-access freeway from approximately three miles (4.8 km) west of Janesville to I-35 at Owatonna. Most of the new route is located south of the existing alignment so as to avoid overlapping I-35. The expansion was opened to traffic on August 31, 2012, creating a continuous four-lane route from North Mankato to Owatonna. The section from Waseca to Janesville has yet to be upgraded to freeway standards; it currently exists as an expressway.

The four-lane expressway was extended from North Mankato to Nicollet including a southwest bypass of Nicollet and an interchange for MN 111 in 2016.

Between Owatonna and Dodge Center, US 14 was upgraded to a freeway in 2021. The new freeway opened to traffic in late 2021.

The segment from Nicollet to New Ulm has been upgraded to a four-lane expressway including a bypass of Courtland. Construction began in 2022 and was completed in November of 2023 after a month long delay due to concrete paving delays.

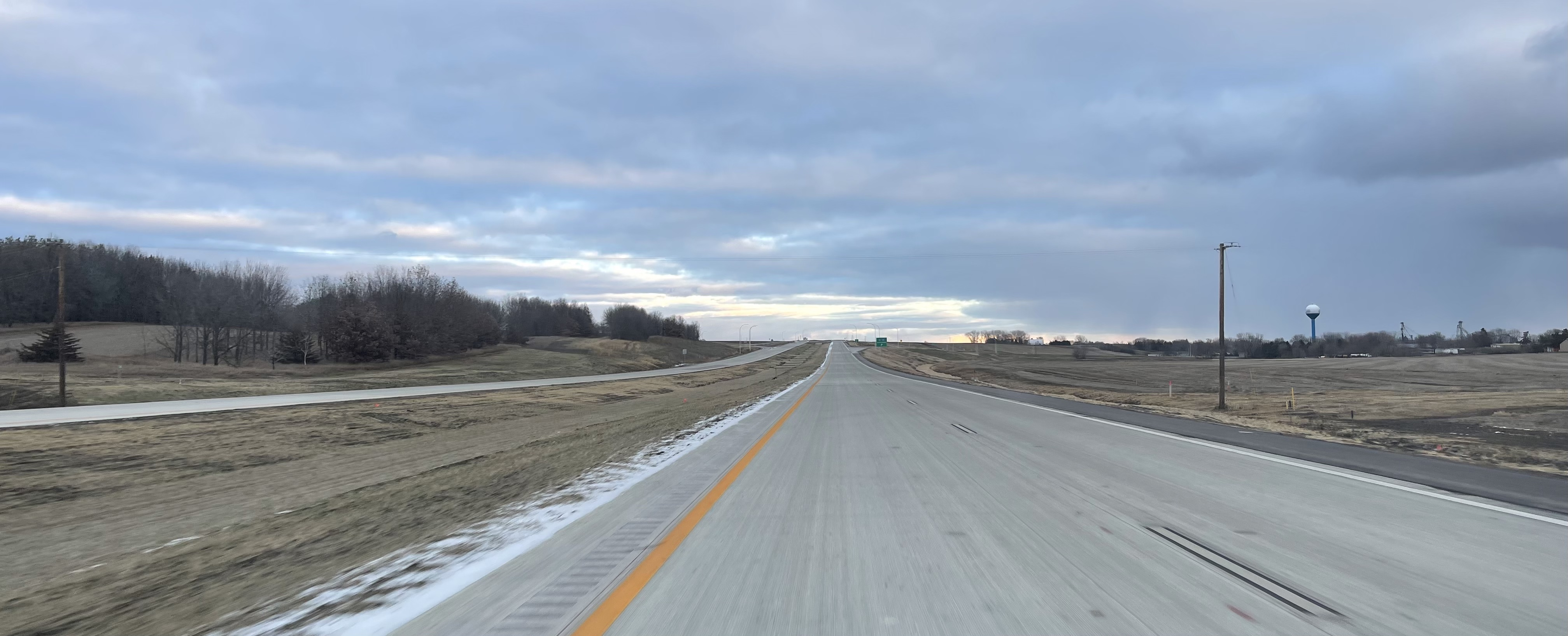
Newly widened US Highway 14 at Courtland traveling East Bound

US 14 is being planned to be upgraded to a freeway between Byron and Rochester with three new interchanges planned. An interim safety project will construct two reduced conflict intersections in 2022.

The Minnesota section of US 14 is defined as part of Constitutional Route 7 and Trunk Highways 121 and 122 in the Minnesota Statutes.

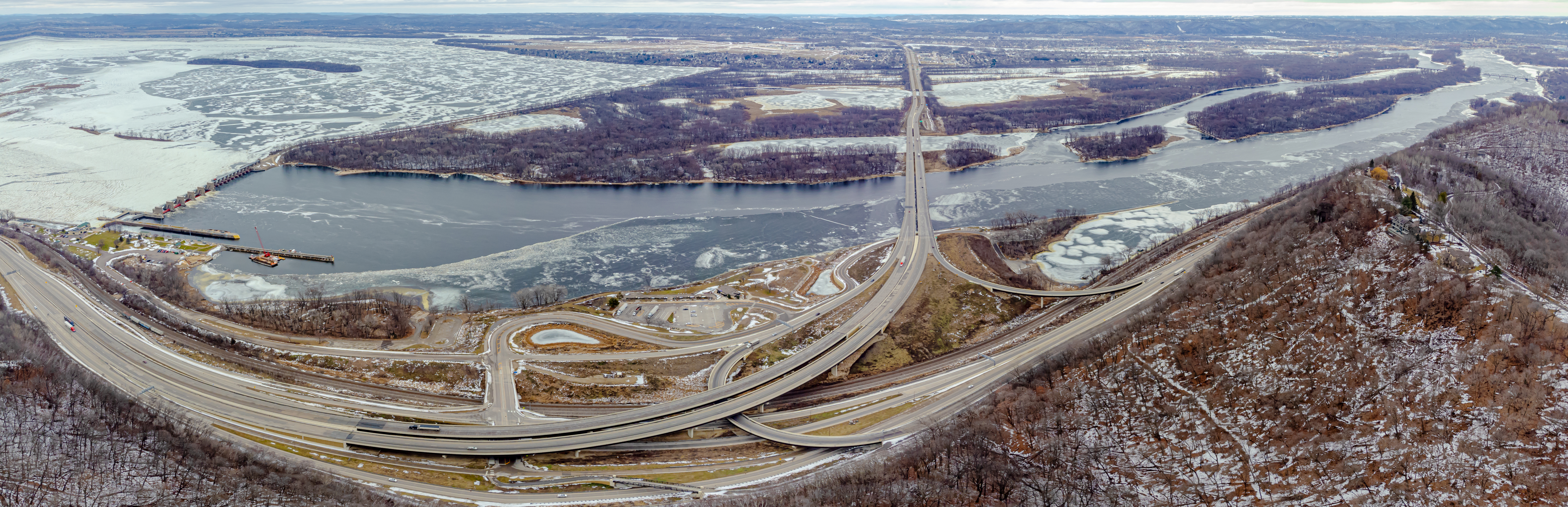
U.S. Route 14/61 junction with I-90

=== Wisconsin ===
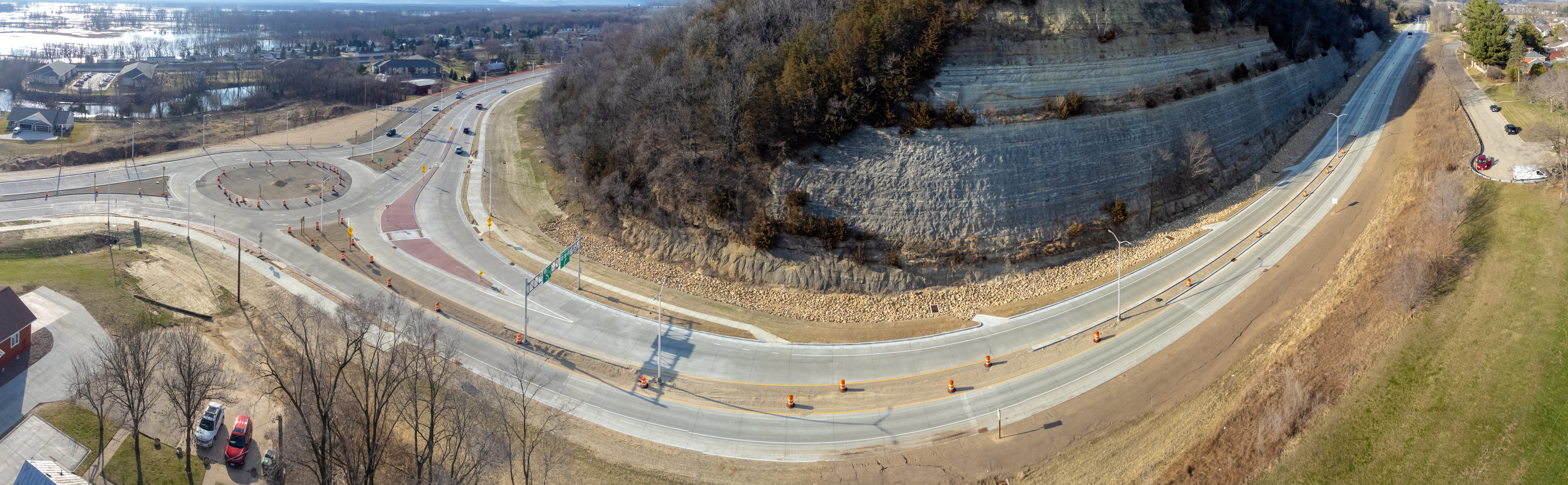
US 14/US 61 roundabout in La Crosse, Wisconsin

US 14 enters the state of Wisconsin along with US 61 across the Mississippi River into La Crosse. Running through rural southern Wisconsin, it then meets with US 12 outside of Madison. Following the Beltline Highway around Madison, it meets US 18 and US 151, before turning south, passing through some southern Madison suburbs, Oregon, and Evansville before approaching Janesville. Bypassing Janesville to the north, US 14 intersects US 51, as well as I-90 and I-39. It then travels southeast, past I-43, to the village square of Walworth. US 14 then turns south and exits into Illinois at Big Foot Prairie.

=== Illinois ===
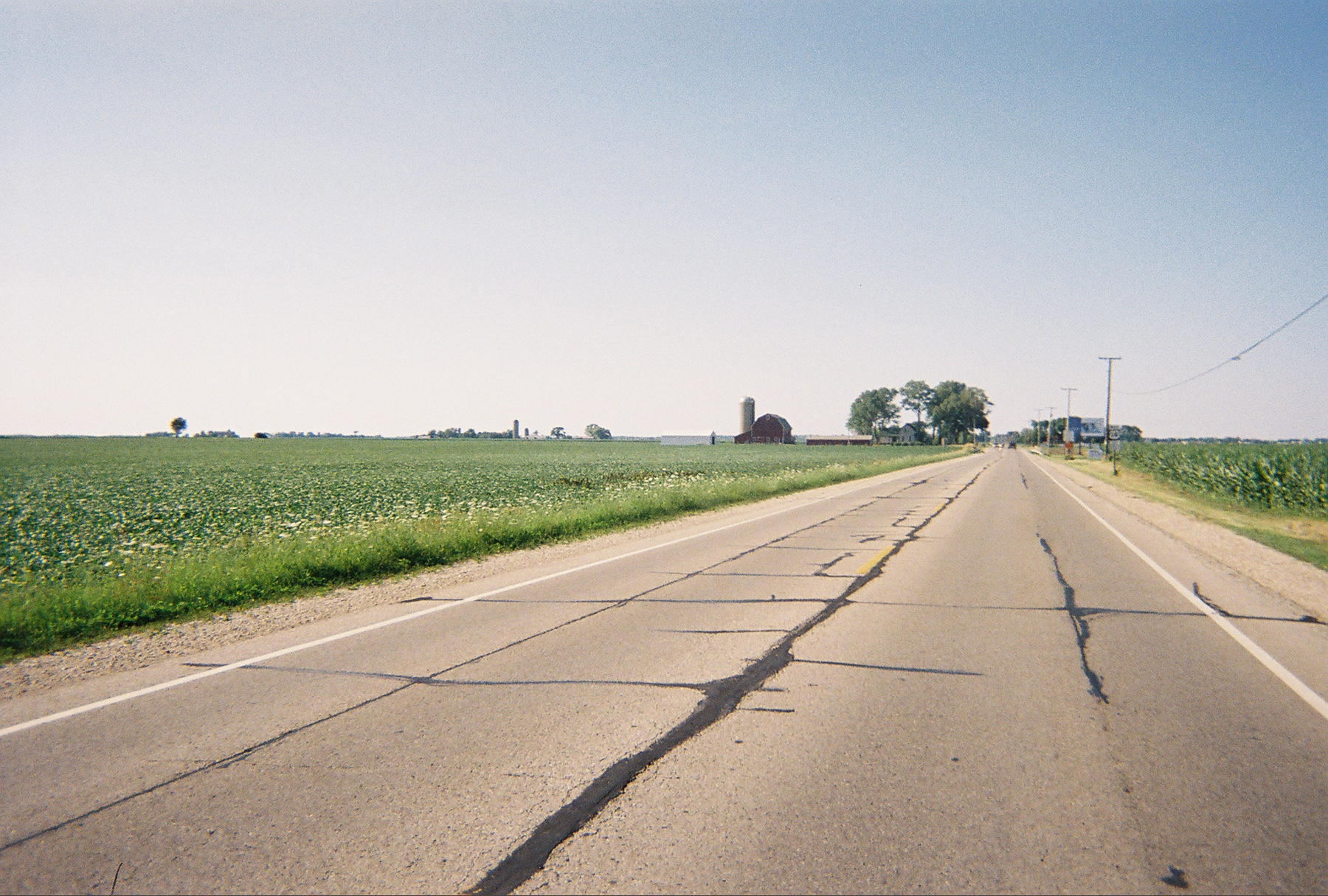
US 14 at the Illinois–Wisconsin border

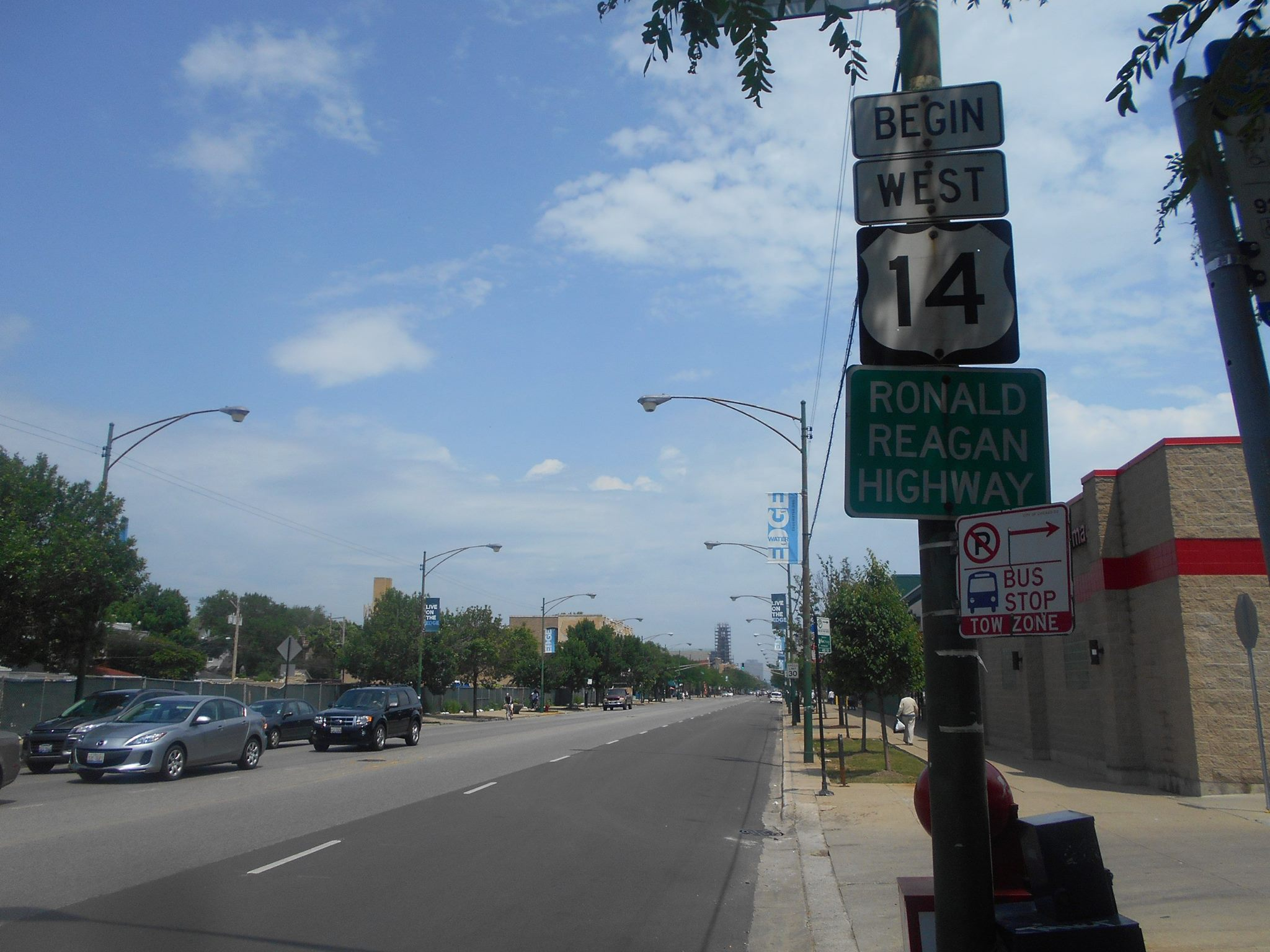
Beginning of US 14 west in Chicago, Illinois

In the state of Illinois, US 14 runs southeast from north of Harvard to Chicago via Woodstock and the northwest suburbs. Southeast of Illinois Route 47 (IL 47), US 14 has four lanes, and, at times, it is a high-speed divided highway. Continuing southeastward from just after the overpass above IL 31, US 14 passes beneath and then closely parallels the tracks of the Union Pacific Railroad's Harvard Subdivision. Through the northwest suburbs of Chicago, this route is commonly referred to as "Northwest Highway" and is a very busy thoroughfare. East of Des Plaines, US 14 becomes Dempster Street until its intersection with Waukegan Road. From here, US 14 follows Waukegan Road, Caldwell Avenue, Peterson Avenue, and Ridge Avenue to its eastern end, at the corner of Broadway and US 41 (Foster Avenue).

At an earlier point, US 14 extended south on Lake Shore Drive onto Michigan Avenue.

== History ==
US 14 was originally the Black and Yellow Trail, so named as it connected Minnesota with the Black Hills and Yellowstone National Park.

In Chicago's northwest suburbs, it is known as Northwest Highway due to its direction as well as it paralleling the old Chicago and North Western Transportation Company railroad (now Union Pacific Railroad). It was originally called the Northwest Highway from Chicago to New Ulm, Minnesota, and some street signs in New Ulm, Chicago, and towns in between still show the old designation.

From Ucross west to Sheridan, Wyoming, US 14 was initially designated U.S. Route 116 (US 116) in 1926. US 116 was extended west to Cody in 1933, absorbing the Deaver–Cody US 420. The next year, US 116 became an extension of US 14. Part of this extension, including all of US 420, is now US 14A.

== Major intersections ==
Wyoming
US 16 / US 20 at the East Entrance to Yellowstone National Park, southeast of Pahaska Tepee. The highways travel concurrently to Greybull.
US 310 west-northwest of Greybull
I-90 / US 87 northeast of Ranchester. The highways travel concurrently to Sheridan.
US 16 southeast of Sheridan. The highways travel concurrently to Moorcroft.
I-90 in Gillette. The highways travel concurrently to Moorcroft.
I-90 in Sundance
I-90 in Sundance. The highways travel concurrently to east-southeast of Wall, South Dakota.
South Dakota
US 85 in North Spearfish. The highways travel concurrently to Spearfish.
I-190 / US 16 in Rapid City
US 83 in Fort Pierre. The highways travel concurrently to west-southwest of Blunt.
US 281 north-northwest of Wolsey. The highways travel concurrently to south-southeast of Wolsey.
US 81 in Arlington. The highways travel concurrently to south of Arlington.
I-29 in Brookings

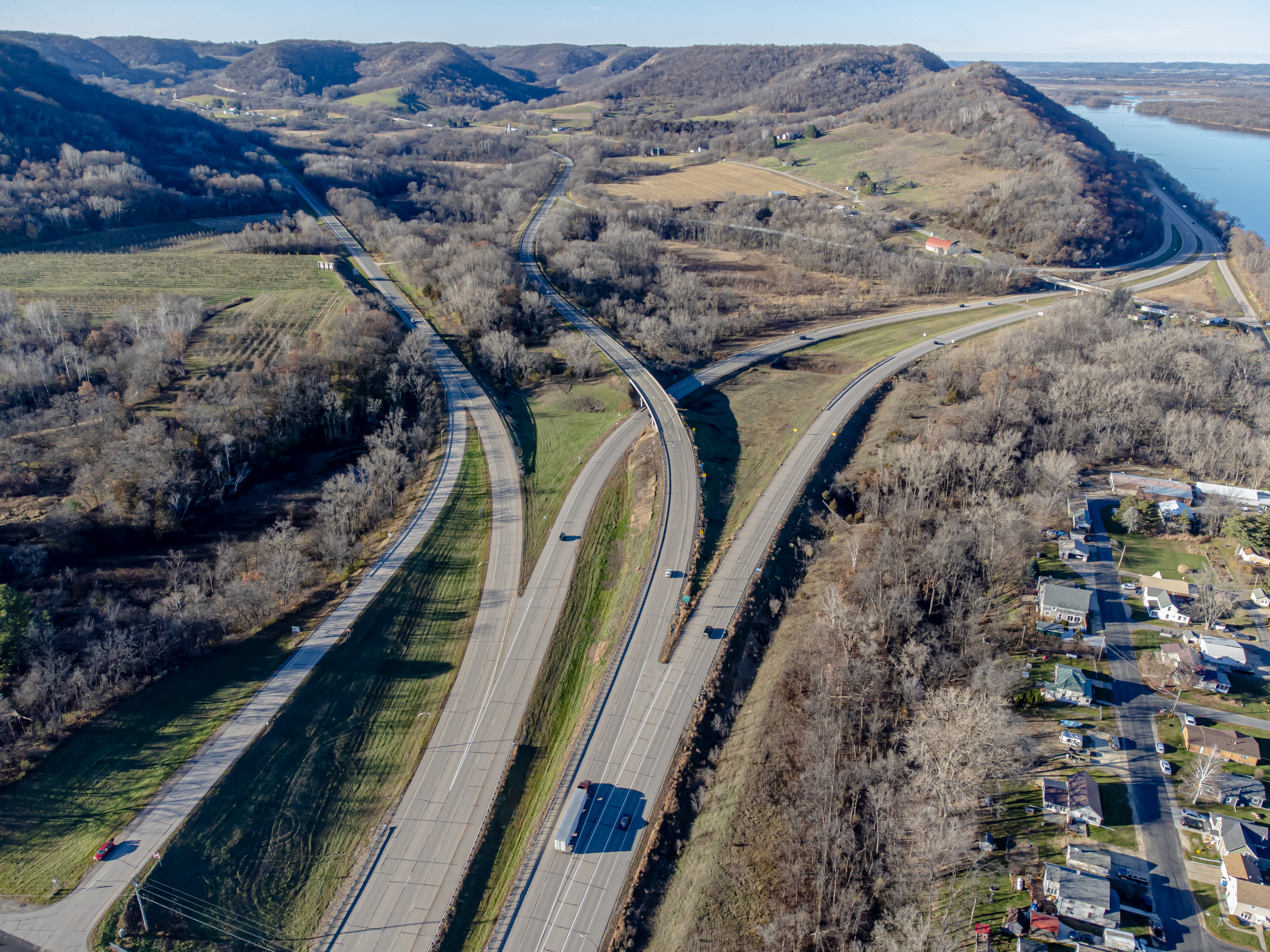
US 14/US 61 and I-90 junction

Minnesota
US 75 in Lake Benton. The highways travel concurrently through the city.
US 59 north of Garvin
US 71 north of Sanborn
US 169 on the North Mankato–Mankato city line
I-35 / US 218 in Owatonna. US 14/US 218 travel concurrently to southeast of Owatonna.
US 52 / US 63 in Rochester. The highways travel concurrently through the city.
US 61 in Winona. The highways travel concurrently to Readstown, Wisconsin.
I-90 in Dakota. The highways travel concurrently to north of La Crescent.
Wisconsin
US 53 in La Crosse
US 12 in Middleton. The highways travel concurrently to Madison.
US 18 / US 151 in Madison. The highways travel concurrently through the city.
US 51 in Janesville
I-39 / I-90 in Janesville
I-43 in Darien
Illinois
US 12 / US 45 in Des Plaines
I-294 in Des Plaines
I-94 in Chicago
US 41 in Edgewater, Chicago

== See also ==
- Special routes of U.S. Route 14

Browse numbered routes
← WYO 13	WY	→ WYO 14
← SD 13	SD	→ SD 15
← MN 13	MN	→ MN 15
← WIS 13	WI	→ WIS 14
← IL 13	IL	→ IL 14
