= Lake Prairie Township, Nicollet County, Minnesota =

Lake Prairie Township, Minnesota
- Township
- Location within the state of Minnesota Lake Prairie Township, Minnesota (the United States)
- Coordinates: 44°24′1″N 94°2′20″W
- Country: United States
- State: Minnesota
- County: Nicollet

Area
  - Total: 55.3 sq mi (143.1 km^{2})
  - Land: 54.8 sq mi (141.9 km^{2})
  - Water: 0.46 sq mi (1.2 km^{2})
- Elevation: 961 ft (293 m)

Population (2000)
  - Total: 652
  - Density: 12/sq mi (4.6/km^{2})
- Time zone: UTC-6 (Central (CST))
  - Summer (DST): UTC-5 (CDT)
- FIPS code: 27-34856
- GNIS feature ID: 0664697

Lake Prairie Township is a township in Nicollet County, Minnesota, United States. The population was 652 at the 2000 census.

Lake Prairie Township was organized in 1858, and named for the lakes and prairie within its borders.

== Geography ==
According to the United States Census Bureau, the township has a total area of 55.2 square miles (143 km^{2}), of which 54.8 square miles (142 km^{2}) is land and 0.4 square miles (1.0 km^{2}) (0.81%) is water.

== Demographics ==
As of the census of 2000, there were 652 people, 235 households, and 184 families residing in the township. The population density was 11.9 inhabitants per square mile (4.6/km^{2}). There were 243 housing units at an average density of 4.4 per square mile (1.7/km^{2}). The racial makeup of the township was 98.93% White, 0.77% African American, 0.15% Asian, 0.15% from other races.

There were 235 households, out of which 34.9% had children under the age of 18 living with them, 69.4% were married couples living together, 4.7% had a female householder with no husband present, and 21.3% were non-families. 17.9% of all households were made up of individuals, and 5.5% had someone living alone who was 65 years of age or older. The average household size was 2.70 and the average family size was 3.07.

In the township the population was spread out, with 26.1% under the age of 18, 4.3% from 18 to 24, 27.9% from 25 to 44, 31.1% from 45 to 64, and 10.6% who were 65 years of age or older. The median age was 41 years. For every 100 females, there were 118.8 males. For every 100 females age 18 and over, there were 121.1 males.

The median income for a household in the township was $52,614, and the median income for a family was $55,500. Males had a median income of $36,042 versus $22,292 for females. The per capita income for the township was $21,500. About 3.2% of families and 2.9% of the population were below the poverty line, including 1.7% of those under age 18 and 8.3% of those age 65 or over.
