= Brighton Township, Nicollet County, Minnesota =

Brighton Township, Minnesota
- Township
- Location within the state of Minnesota Brighton Township, Minnesota (the United States)
- Coordinates: 44°20′14″N 94°18′3″W
- Country: United States
- State: Minnesota
- County: Nicollet

Area
  - Total: 19.1 sq mi (49.4 km^{2})
  - Land: 18.0 sq mi (46.6 km^{2})
  - Water: 1.1 sq mi (2.8 km^{2})
- Elevation: 1,020 ft (311 m)

Population (2000)
  - Total: 169
  - Density: 9.3/sq mi (3.6/km^{2})
- Time zone: UTC-6 (Central (CST))
  - Summer (DST): UTC-5 (CDT)
- FIPS code: 27-07732
- GNIS feature ID: 0663666

Brighton Township is a township in Nicollet County, Minnesota, United States. The population was 169 at the 2000 census.

Brighton Township was organized in 1877, and named after Brighton, Kenosha County, Wisconsin.

== Geography ==
According to the United States Census Bureau, the township has a total area of 19.1 square miles (49 km^{2}), of which 18.0 square miles (47 km^{2}) is land and 1.1 square miles (2.8 km^{2}) (5.72%) is water.

== Demographics ==
As of the census of 2000, there were 169 people, 60 households, and 45 families residing in the township. The population density was 9.4 inhabitants per square mile (3.6/km^{2}). There were 66 housing units at an average density of 3.7 per square mile (1.4/km^{2}). The racial makeup of the township was 95.86% White, 0.59% Native American, 3.55% from other races. Hispanic or Latino of any race were 3.55% of the population.

There were 60 households, out of which 31.7% had children under the age of 18 living with them, 68.3% were married couples living together, 5.0% had a female householder with no husband present, and 25.0% were non-families. 16.7% of all households were made up of individuals, and 6.7% had someone living alone who was 65 years of age or older. The average household size was 2.82 and the average family size was 3.29.

In the township the population was spread out, with 27.2% under the age of 18, 10.1% from 18 to 24, 27.8% from 25 to 44, 20.7% from 45 to 64, and 14.2% who were 65 years of age or older. The median age was 36 years. For every 100 females, there were 116.7 males. For every 100 females age 18 and over, there were 127.8 males.

The median income for a household in the township was $40,000, and the median income for a family was $44,375. Males had a median income of $25,500 versus $17,188 for females. The per capita income for the township was $14,437. About 7.5% of families and 9.9% of the population were below the poverty line, including 16.0% of those under the age of eighteen and 20.0% of those 65 or over.
