= Granby Township, Nicollet County, Minnesota =

Granby Township, Minnesota
- Township
- Location within the state of Minnesota Granby Township, Minnesota (the United States)
- Coordinates: 44°19′54″N 94°11′44″W
- Country: United States
- State: Minnesota
- County: Nicollet

Area
  - Total: 33.9 sq mi (87.8 km^{2})
  - Land: 27.5 sq mi (71.3 km^{2})
  - Water: 6.4 sq mi (16.5 km^{2})
- Elevation: 991 ft (302 m)

Population (2000)
  - Total: 259
  - Density: 9.3/sq mi (3.6/km^{2})
- Time zone: UTC-6 (Central (CST))
  - Summer (DST): UTC-5 (CDT)
- FIPS code: 27-24902
- GNIS feature ID: 0664310

Granby Township is a township in Nicollet County, Minnesota, United States. The population was 259 at the 2000 census.

Granby Township was organized in 1858.

== Geography ==
According to the United States Census Bureau, the township has a total area of 33.9 square miles (88 km^{2}), of which 27.5 square miles (71 km^{2}) is land and 6.4 square miles (17 km^{2}) (18.76%) is water.

== Demographics ==
As of the census of 2000, there were 259 people, 91 households, and 72 families residing in the township. The population density was 9.4 inhabitants per square mile (3.6/km^{2}). There were 95 housing units at an average density of 3.4 per square mile (1.3/km^{2}). The racial makeup of the township was 98.07% White, 1.16% Asian, 0.39% from other races, and 0.39% from two or more races. Hispanic or Latino of any race were 0.39% of the population.

There were 91 households, out of which 34.1% had children under the age of 18 living with them, 72.5% were married couples living together, 5.5% had a female householder with no husband present, and 19.8% were non-families. 16.5% of all households were made up of individuals, and 7.7% had someone living alone who was 65 years of age or older. The average household size was 2.85 and the average family size was 3.18.

In the township the population was spread out, with 24.7% under the age of 18, 7.3% from 18 to 24, 26.6% from 25 to 44, 21.6% from 45 to 64, and 19.7% who were 65 years of age or older. The median age was 40 years. For every 100 females, there were 96.2 males. For every 100 females age 18 and over, there were 119.1 males.

The median income for a household in the township was $42,031, and the median income for a family was $47,917. Males had a median income of $31,806 versus $21,667 for females. The per capita income for the township was $15,713. None of the families and 0.8% of the population were living below the poverty line, including no under eighteens and 3.9% of those over 64.
