= Ridgely Township, Nicollet County, Minnesota =

Ridgely Township, Minnesota
- Township
- Location within the state of Minnesota Ridgely Township, Minnesota (the United States)
- Coordinates: 44°25′48″N 94°39′30″W
- Country: United States
- State: Minnesota
- County: Nicollet

Area
  - Total: 18.8 sq mi (48.6 km^{2})
  - Land: 18.7 sq mi (48.4 km^{2})
  - Water: 0.077 sq mi (0.2 km^{2})
- Elevation: 856 ft (261 m)

Population (2000)
  - Total: 126
  - Density: 6.7/sq mi (2.6/km^{2})
- Time zone: UTC-6 (Central (CST))
  - Summer (DST): UTC-5 (CDT)
- FIPS code: 27-54430
- GNIS feature ID: 0665420

Ridgely Township is a township in Nicollet County, Minnesota, United States. The population was 118 at the 2018 census.

Ridgely Township was organized in 1871, and named after Fort Ridgely.

== Geography ==
According to the United States Census Bureau, the township has a total area of 18.8 square miles (48.6 km^{2}), of which 18.7 square miles (48.4 km^{2}) is land and 0.1 square mile (0.2 km^{2}) (0.43%) is water.

== Demographics ==
As of the census of 2018, there were 118 people, 44 households, and 30 families residing in the township. The population density was 6.7 people per square mile (2.6/km^{2}). There were 45 housing units at an average density of 2.4/sq mi (0.9/km^{2}). The racial makeup of the township was 99.21% White, and 0.79% from two or more races.

There were 44 households, out of which 29.5% had children under the age of 18 living with them, 61.4% were married couples living together, 2.3% had a female householder with no husband present, and 31.8% were non-families. 15.9% of all households were made up of individuals, and 4.5% had someone living alone who was 65 years of age or older. The average household size was 2.86 and the average family size was 3.37.

In the township, the population was spread out, with 31.7% under the age of 18, 4.8% from 18 to 24, 27.8% from 25 to 44, 27.8% from 45 to 64, and 7.9% who were 65 years of age or older. The median age was 38 years. For every 100 females, there were 133.3 males. For every 100 females age 18 and over, there were 126.3 males.

The median income for a household in the township was $41,875, and the median income for a family was $50,417. Males had a median income of $38,750 versus $20,625 for females. The per capita income for the township was $17,339. There were no families and 7.6% of the population living below the poverty line, including no under eighteens and 20.0% of those over 64.
