= Courtland Township, Nicollet County, Minnesota =

Courtland Township, Minnesota
- Township
- Location within the state of Minnesota Courtland Township, Minnesota (the United States)
- Coordinates: 44°17′13″N 94°20′58″W
- Country: United States
- State: Minnesota
- County: Nicollet

Area
  - Total: 42.0 sq mi (108.9 km^{2})
  - Land: 37.8 sq mi (98.0 km^{2})
  - Water: 4.2 sq mi (10.9 km^{2})
- Elevation: 980 ft (300 m)

Population (2000)
  - Total: 715
  - Density: 19/sq mi (7.3/km^{2})
- Time zone: UTC-6 (Central (CST))
  - Summer (DST): UTC-5 (CDT)
- ZIP code: 56021
- Area code: 507
- FIPS code: 27-13600
- GNIS feature ID: 0663884

Courtland Township is a township in Nicollet County, Minnesota, United States. The population was 466 as per the 2022 census.

Courtland Township was originally called Hilo Township, after Hilo, Hawaii, and under the latter name was organized in 1858. The present name, adopted in 1865, came from Cortland, New York.

== Geography ==
According to the United States Census Bureau, the township has a total area of 42.1 square miles (109 km^{2}), of which 37.8 square miles (98 km^{2}) is land and 4.2 square miles (11 km^{2}) (10.01%) is water.

== Demographics ==
At the 2000 census, there were 715 people, 235 households and 190 families residing in the township. The population density was 18.9 per square mile (7.3/km^{2}). There were 239 housing units at an average density of 6.3 per square mile (2.4/km^{2}). The racial make-up of the township was 98.88% White, 0.98% from other races and 0.14% from two or more races. Hispanic or Latino of any race were 2.10% of the population.

There were 235 households, of which 40.9% had children under the age of 18 living with them, 76.2% were married couples living together, 1.3% had a female householder with no husband present and 19.1% were non-families. 13.6% of all households were made up of individuals, and 5.5% had someone living alone who was 65 years of age or older. The average household size was 3.04 and the average family size was 3.41.

30.8%of the population were under the age of 18, 7.8% from 18 to 24, 26.6% from 25 to 44, 26.3% from 45 to 64 and 8.5% were 65 years of age or older. The median age was 36 years. For every 100 females there were 108.5 males. For every 100 females age 18 and over, there were 115.2 males.

The median household income was $53,977 and the median family income was $55,000. Males had a median income of $31,667 and females $20,882. The per capita income was $19,041. About 4.9% of families and 7.8% of the population were below the poverty line, including 14.1% of those under age 18 and none of those age 65 or over.
