= Belgrade Township, Nicollet County, Minnesota =

Belgrade Township, Minnesota
- Township
- Location within the state of Minnesota Belgrade Township, Minnesota (the United States)
- Coordinates: 44°13′10″N 94°3′14″W
- Country: United States
- State: Minnesota
- County: Nicollet

Area
  - Total: 35.3 sq mi (91.5 km^{2})
  - Land: 35.1 sq mi (91.0 km^{2})
  - Water: 0.19 sq mi (0.5 km^{2})
- Elevation: 997 ft (304 m)

Population (2000)
  - Total: 1,033
  - Density: 30/sq mi (11.4/km^{2})
- Time zone: UTC-6 (Central (CST))
  - Summer (DST): UTC-5 (CDT)
- FIPS code: 27-04744
- GNIS feature ID: 0663551
- Website: https://belgradetownshipmn.gov/

Belgrade Township is a township in Nicollet County, Minnesota, United States. The population was 1,033 at the 2000 census.

Belgrade Township was organized in 1858, and named after Belgrade, Maine.

== Geography ==
Public Land Survey System (PLSS) of the United States: Township 108 North, Range 27 West, Fifth Meridian, 22,895 acres. According to the United States Census Bureau, the township has a total area of 35.3 square miles (91 km^{2}), of which 35.1 square miles (91 km^{2}) is land and 0.2 square miles (0.52 km^{2}) (0.54%) is water.

== Demographics ==
As of the census of 2000, there were 1,033 people, 371 households, and 309 families residing in the township. The population density was 29.4 inhabitants per square mile (11.4/km^{2}). There were 429 housing units at an average density of 12.2 per square mile (4.7/km^{2}). The racial makeup of the township was 98.55% White, 0.19% African American, 0.48% Asian, 0.19% from other races, and 0.58% from two or more races. Hispanic or Latino of any race were 0.48% of the population.

There were 371 households, out of which 40.7% had children under the age of 18 living with them, 75.2% were married couples living together, 4.3% had a female householder with no husband present, and 16.7% were non-families. 14.8% of all households were made up of individuals, and 5.1% had someone living alone who was 65 years of age or older. The average household size was 2.78 and the average family size was 3.07.

In the township the population was spread out, with 27.3% under the age of 18, 7.6% from 18 to 24, 29.0% from 25 to 44, 26.9% from 45 to 64, and 9.2% who were 65 years of age or older. The median age was 38 years. For every 100 females, there were 102.2 males. For every 100 females age 18 and over, there were 103.5 males.

The median income for a household in the township was $61,827, and the median income for a family was $66,083. Males had a median income of $40,417 versus $25,568 for females. The per capita income for the township was $23,762. About 1.3% of families and 2.3% of the population were below the poverty line, including 3.9% of those under age 18 and 2.0% of those age 65 or over.
