= Nicollet Township, Nicollet County, Minnesota =

Nicollet Township, Minnesota
- Township
- Location within the state of Minnesota Nicollet Township, Minnesota (the United States)
- Coordinates: 44°14′29″N 94°11′2″W
- Country: United States
- State: Minnesota
- County: Nicollet

Area
  - Total: 33.4 sq mi (86.6 km^{2})
  - Land: 33.1 sq mi (85.8 km^{2})
  - Water: 0.31 sq mi (0.8 km^{2})
- Elevation: 991 ft (302 m)

Population (2020)
  - Total: 483
  - Density: 16/sq mi (6/km^{2})
- Time zone: UTC-6 (Central (CST))
  - Summer (DST): UTC-5 (CDT)
- ZIP code: 56074
- Area code: 507
- FIPS code: 27-46168
- GNIS feature ID: 0665121

Nicollet Township is a township in Nicollet County, Minnesota, United States. The population was 483 at the 2020 census.

Nicollet Township was organized in 1858, and was named after the county in which it is located.

== Geography ==
According to the United States Census Bureau, the township has a total area of 33.4 square miles (86.6 km^{2}), of which 33.1 square miles (85.8 km^{2}) is land, and 0.3 square miles (0.8 km^{2})(0.96%) is water.

== Demographics ==
At the 2020 census, there were 483 people, 183 households, and 149 families residing in the township. The population density was 14.5 per square mile (5.6/km^{2}). There were 197 housing units at an average density of 5.9/sq mi (2.3/km^{2}). The racial makeup of the township was 96.9% White, 0.8% Black, 0.4% Native American, and 1.7% Multiracial.

Of the 183 households 32.8% had children under the age of 18 living with them, 84.2% were married couples living together, 4.4% had a female householder with no spouse present, and 7.7% had a male householder with no spouse present. 9.8% of all households were made up of individuals, and 3.8% had someone living alone who was 65 years of age or older. The average household size was 2.93 and the average family size was 3.19.

Age distribution was 27.5% under the age of 20, 54.7% from 20 to 64, 17.8% who were 65 years of age or older. The median age was 39.3 years. The population was 52% male and 48% female.

The median household income was $100,284, and the median family income was $101,548. According to the 2023 American Community Survey, Males had a median income of $42,279 versus $50,000 for females. The per capita income for the township was $46,494. 0.2% of the population were below the poverty line.
