= Lafayette Township, Nicollet County, Minnesota =

Lafayette Township, Minnesota
- Township
- Location within the state of Minnesota Lafayette Township, Minnesota (the United States)
- Coordinates: 44°24′5″N 94°26′2″W
- Country: United States
- State: Minnesota
- County: Nicollet

Area
  - Total: 50.5 sq mi (130.7 km^{2})
  - Land: 50.4 sq mi (130.5 km^{2})
  - Water: 0.077 sq mi (0.2 km^{2})
- Elevation: 1,010 ft (308 m)

Population (2000)
  - Total: 724
  - Density: 14/sq mi (5.5/km^{2})
- Time zone: UTC-6 (Central (CST))
  - Summer (DST): UTC-5 (CDT)
- ZIP code: 56054
- Area code: 507
- FIPS code: 27-33938
- GNIS feature ID: 0664655

Lafayette Township is a township in Nicollet County, Minnesota, United States. The population was 724 at the 2000 census.

Lafayette Township was organized in 1858, and named for Gilbert du Motier, Marquis de Lafayette (1757–1834), a French general and American Revolutionary War general.

== Geography ==
According to the United States Census Bureau, the township has a total area of 50.5 square miles (131 km^{2}), of which 50.4 square miles (131 km^{2}) is land and 0.1 square miles (0.26 km^{2}) (0.14%) is water.

== Demographics ==
As of the census of 2000, there were 724 people, 265 households, and 218 families residing in the township. The population density was 14.4 inhabitants per square mile (5.6/km^{2}). There were 275 housing units at an average density of 5.5 per square mile (2.1/km^{2}). The racial makeup of the township was 99.59% White, 0.14% Asian, and 0.28% from two or more races. Hispanic or Latino of any race were 0.14% of the population.

There were 265 households, out of which 36.2% had children under the age of 18 living with them, 75.1% were married couples living together, 3.0% had a female householder with no husband present, and 17.4% were non-families. 14.3% of all households were made up of individuals, and 6.0% had someone living alone who was 65 years of age or older. The average household size was 2.73 and the average family size was 3.04.

In the township the population was spread out, with 26.4% under the age of 18, 8.1% from 18 to 24, 27.6% from 25 to 44, 27.2% from 45 to 64, and 10.6% who were 65 years of age or older. The median age was 38 years. For every 100 females, there were 116.1 males. For every 100 females age 18 and over, there were 114.1 males.

The median income for a household in the township was $51,319, and the median income for a family was $55,083. Males had a median income of $30,938 versus $26,696 for females. The per capita income for the township was $23,397. About 5.4% of families and 7.1% of the population were below the poverty line, including 9.5% of those under age 18 and 15.7% of those age 65 or over.
