= New Sweden Township, Nicollet County, Minnesota =

New Sweden Township, Minnesota
- Township
- Location within the state of Minnesota New Sweden Township, Minnesota (the United States)
- Coordinates: 44°24′24″N 94°11′43″W
- Country: United States
- State: Minnesota
- County: Nicollet

Area
  - Total: 35.9 sq mi (93.1 km^{2})
  - Land: 35.8 sq mi (92.7 km^{2})
  - Water: 0.15 sq mi (0.4 km^{2})
- Elevation: 997 ft (304 m)

Population (2020)
  - Total: 279
  - Density: 7.80/sq mi (3.01/km^{2})
- Time zone: UTC-6 (Central (CST))
  - Summer (DST): UTC-5 (CDT)
- FIPS code: 27-45988
- GNIS feature ID: 0665114

New Sweden Township is a township in Nicollet County, Minnesota, United States. The population was 279 at the 2020 census.

New Sweden Township was organized in 1864, and named for the native country of many of its early settlers.

== Geography ==
According to the United States Census Bureau, the township has a total area of 36.0 square miles (93.1 km^{2}), of which 35.8 square miles (92.7 km^{2}) is land and 0.2 square mile (0.4 km^{2}) (0.47%) is water.

== Demographics ==
Historical population
Census	Pop.	Note	%±
2000	329		—
2010	297		−9.7%
2020	279		−6.1%

As of the census of 2000, there were 326 people, 112 households, and 86 families residing in the township. The population density was 9.1 people per square mile (3.5/km^{2}). There were 127 housing units at an average density of 3.5/sq mi (1.4/km^{2}). The racial makeup of the township was 99.39% White and 0.61% Asian.

There were 112 households, out of which 36.6% had children under the age of 18 living with them, 74.1% were married couples living together, 0.9% had a female householder with no husband present, and 23.2% were non-families. 19.6% of all households were made up of individuals, and 8.9% had someone living alone who was 65 years of age or older. The average household size was 2.91 and the average family size was 3.41.

In the township the population was spread out, with 31.6% under the age of 18, 5.5% from 18 to 24, 28.8% from 25 to 44, 20.2% from 45 to 64, and 13.8% who were 65 years of age or older. The median age was 37 years. For every 100 females, there were 110.3 males. For every 100 females age 18 and over, there were 110.4 males.

The median income for a household in the township was $45,000, and the median income for a family was $52,500. Males had a median income of $30,250 versus $22,500 for females. The per capita income for the township was $18,042. About 6.5% of families and 9.0% of the population were below the poverty line, including 13.0% of those under age 18 and none of those age 65 or over.
