= National Register of Historic Places listings in Le Sueur County, Minnesota =

Location of Le Sueur County in Minnesota

This is a list of the National Register of Historic Places listings in Le Sueur County, Minnesota. It is intended to be a complete list of the properties and districts on the National Register of Historic Places in Le Sueur County, Minnesota, United States. The locations of National Register properties and districts for which the latitude and longitude coordinates are included below, may be seen in an online map.

There are 28 properties and districts listed on the National Register in the county. A supplementary list includes two additional sites that were formerly on the National Register.

This National Park Service list is complete through NPS recent listings posted May 1, 2026.

== Current listings ==
| | Name on the Register | Image | Date listed | Location | City or town | Description |
|---|---|---|---|---|---|---|
| 1 | John R. Andrews House | John R. Andrews House | October 10, 1978 (#78003123) | County Highway 19; 44°17′07″N 93°54′33″W | Kasota | House purchased in 1874 by the founder of the Andrews Opera Company, a nationally famous, family-based troupe that toured widely in the late 19th century. Likely demolished (see talk page). |
| 2 | Bridge No. 4846 | Bridge No. 4846 | February 17, 1981 (#81000681) | 47102 Washington Park Rd. 44°15′59″N 93°53′54″W | Kasota | Minnesota's oldest surviving Pratt truss bridge, built in 1875 and relocated in 1929. Moved again in 1984; now the Shanaska Creek Bridge in Lake Washington County Park. |
| 3 | Broadway Bridge | Broadway Bridge | August 5, 1999 (#99000934) | Minnesota Highway 99 over the Minnesota River; 44°19′29″N 93°57′11″W | Ottawa Township | 1931 steel highway bridge built with two asymmetrical trusses disguised by ornamental members to span a challenging site at a river bend. Extends into Nicollet County. |
| 4 | Carson H. Cosgrove House | Carson H. Cosgrove House | March 15, 1982 (#82004694) | 228 S. 2nd St. 44°27′32″N 93°54′58″W | Le Sueur | Elaborate and well-preserved house built circa 1895 for Carson Nesbit Cosgrove (1853–1936), a founder of the canned food company that grew into Green Giant. |
| 5 | Arthur Dehn House | Arthur Dehn House | November 19, 1982 (#82000561) | Herbert St. 44°13′26″N 93°34′29″W | Waterville | Family home from 1914 to the 1960s of noted artist Adolf Dehn (1895–1968). Listed under his father's name as Adolf was never a permanent resident. Likely demolished (see talk page). |
| 6 | Dodd Road Discontiguous District | Dodd Road Discontiguous District | June 12, 2003 (#03000520) | County Road 148 west of Cleveland; County Road 136 from MN 13 to Cordova; 44°19′39″N 93°37′47″W | Cleveland and Kilkenny vicinities | Two segments of a privately funded road built between Mendota and St. Peter in 1853, a key transportation artery in early south-central Minnesota. A third segment lies in Rice County. |
| 7 | Elysian Public School | Elysian Public School | February 17, 1981 (#81000677) | 301 N. 2nd St. 44°12′03″N 93°40′26″W | Elysian | Prominent 1895 school, a well-preserved example of Le Sueur County's turn-of-the-20th-century educational facilities. Now a museum. |
| 8 | First National Bank | First National Bank | March 15, 1982 (#82004703) | 112 Main St. E. 44°32′36″N 93°34′35″W | New Prague | 1922 bank with a glazed terracotta façade, nominated as the area's most architecturally significant commercial building. |
| 9 | Geldner Sawmill | Geldner Sawmill | June 11, 1975 (#75000991) | 46542 Beaver Dam Rd. 44°16′29″N 93°44′38″W | Cleveland vicinity | Le Sueur County's last surviving early sawmill, built circa 1860 and moved to its current location in 1876. |
| 10 | German Evangelical Salem Church | German Evangelical Salem Church | March 15, 1982 (#82004696) | County Road 156; 44°29′08″N 93°47′19″W | Le Sueur vicinity | Rare surviving example of an early rural church built to anchor an ethnic farming community, constructed in 1870 to serve the German immigrants who settled northwest Le Sueur County. |
| 11 | Hilltop Hall | Hilltop Hall | March 15, 1982 (#82004701) | 206 N. 1st St. 44°26′25″N 93°34′53″W | Montgomery | Well-preserved example of the commercial buildings erected in the area's late-19th-century rail towns; constructed circa 1892 with an upper-floor event hall. |
| 12 | Hotel Broz | Hotel Broz | March 15, 1982 (#82004704) | 212 Main St. W. 44°32′36″N 93°34′49″W | New Prague | 1898 hotel exemplifying the first-class accommodations that served to increase lodging, social space, and civic pride in the region's growing 19th-century communities. |
| 13 | Kasota Township Hall | Kasota Township Hall | February 17, 1981 (#81000679) | 301 N. Rice St. 44°17′32″N 93°57′55″W | Kasota | Unusual example of a late-19th-century township hall, constructed in 1888 as a substantial, purpose-built structure in a population center rather than the typical approach of occupying an existing structure in the countryside. |
| 14 | Kasota Village Hall | Kasota Village Hall | February 17, 1981 (#81000680) | 201 Webster St. 44°17′29″N 93°58′00″W | Kasota | 1898 village hall built during Kasota's peak as a major quarrying center, and representative of Minnesota's late-19th/early-20th-century municipal architecture. |
| 15 | Le Sueur County Courthouse and Jail | Le Sueur County Courthouse and Jail | February 17, 1981 (#81000682) | 88 and 130 S. Park Ave. 44°23′18″N 93°43′56″W | Le Center | 1896 courthouse and 1914 jail, local landmarks representative of Le Sueur County's government and the origin of Le Center as a purpose-built county seat. |
| 16 | Le Sueur Public School | Le Sueur Public School | February 5, 2026 (#100012689) | 115 N. 5th St. 44°27′35″N 93°54′33″W | Le Sueur | The only junior and senior high school for Le Sueur and the surrounding area 1930–1968, expanded 1952–1953 to include an elementary school as well. |
| 17 | Dr. William W. Mayo House | Dr. William W. Mayo House | November 25, 1969 (#69000074) | 118 N. Main St. 44°27′44″N 93°54′54″W | Le Sueur | 1859 home and clinic of Dr. William Worrall Mayo (1819–1911), who went on to found the Mayo Clinic with his sons. Now a museum. |
| 18 | Methodist Episcopal Church | Methodist Episcopal Church | March 15, 1982 (#82004697) | 39024 Whittier St. 44°23′02″N 93°56′53″W | Ottawa | 1859 limestone Greek Revival church. Also known as the Little Stone Church. |
| 19 | Montgomery Commercial Historic District | Montgomery Commercial Historic District | April 9, 2021 (#100006360) | Centering on 1st St. between Vine Ave. and Oak Ave., roughly bounded by 2nd St. W. and UPRR tracks 44°26′14″N 93°34′52″W | Montgomery | Three-block central business district of a railroad community with an agriculture-based economy, with 29 contributing properties built 1877–1940. |
| 20 | Needham-Hayes House | Needham-Hayes House | March 15, 1982 (#82004698) | 39770 County Rd. 23; 44°22′57″N 93°56′38″W | Ottawa | Unusually large and eclectically designed house built circa 1870 for early settler Charles Needham, who became a prosperous businessman and leading local citizen. |
| 21 | Ottawa Township Hall | Ottawa Township Hall | March 15, 1982 (#82004705) | 39120 Old Ottawa Rd. 44°23′00″N 93°56′47″W | Ottawa | 1860 limestone Greek Revival municipal hall. |
| 22 | John Rinshed House | John Rinshed House | March 15, 1982 (#82004707) | 39134 Sumner St. 44°22′56″N 93°56′53″W | Ottawa | 1870 limestone house. |
| 23 | Charles Schwartz House and Barn | Charles Schwartz House and Barn | March 15, 1982 (#82004708) | 38448 Exchange St. 44°23′36″N 93°56′54″W | Ottawa | 1870 limestone house and barn. |
| 24 | Smith-Cosgrove House | Smith-Cosgrove House | March 15, 1982 (#82004700) | 228 S. Main St. 44°27′34″N 93°55′02″W | Le Sueur | One of Le Sueur County's most architecturally distinctive residences, a Second Empire house built circa 1878 for banker Edson Smith and later owned by merchant James A. Cosgrove, two prominent local businessmen. |
| 25 | George W. Taylor House | George W. Taylor House | September 5, 1975 (#75000992) | 103 S. 2nd St. 44°27′38″N 93°54′50″W | Le Sueur | One of Minnesota's finest surviving Eastlake movement houses, built in 1890 for prominent businessman George W. Taylor (b. 1841). |
| 26 | Trinity Chapel-Episcopal | Trinity Chapel-Episcopal | March 15, 1982 (#82004695) | 39132 Sumner St. 44°22′56″N 93°56′58″W | Ottawa | 1861 limestone Gothic Revival chapel. |
| 27 | Union Hotel | Union Hotel | March 15, 1982 (#82004709) | 201 Paquin St. E. 44°13′04″N 93°34′03″W | Waterville | 1888 hotel expanded circa 1895, associated with Watertown's key period of growth as a rail-served business and vacation destination. |
| 28 | Westerman Lumber Office and House | Westerman Lumber Office and House | March 15, 1982 (#82004702) | 201 S. 1st St. 44°26′15″N 93°34′51″W | Montgomery | Headquarters of a major regional lumber company founded in 1889, with an 1895 residential addition and cladding representative of the area's 19th-century brick buildings. Also a contributing property to the Montgomery Commercial Historic District. |

== Former listings ==
| | Name on the Register | Image | Date listed | Date removed | Location | City or town | Description |
|---|---|---|---|---|---|---|---|
| 1 | Elysian Water Tower | Elysian Water Tower | February 17, 1981 (#81000678) | April 26, 1993 | Frank Street | Elysian | 1895 water tower. Demolished in 1989 to make way for a modern replacement. |
| 2 | David Patten Farmhouse | | March 15, 1982 (#82004706) | January 15, 2003 | Liberty Street | Ottawa | 1863 limestone house. Demolished in 2002. |

== See also ==
- List of National Historic Landmarks in Minnesota
- National Register of Historic Places listings in Minnesota
