= St. Thomas, Minnesota =

Unincorporated community in Minnesota, US

- Unincorporated community
- Location within Minnesota Location within the United States
- Coordinates: 44°29′52″N 93°45′27″W
- Country: United States
- State: Minnesota
- County: Le Sueur
- Township: Derrynane
- Elevation: 1,004 ft (306 m)
- Time zone: UTC-6 (Central (CST))
  - Summer (DST): UTC-5 (CDT)
- ZIP code: 56058
- Area code: 507
- GNIS feature ID: 651065

St. Thomas is an unincorporated community in Derrynane Township, Le Sueur County, Minnesota, United States.

The community is located along Le Sueur County Road 28 (St. Thomas Road) near its junction with Le Sueur County Road 11.

St. Thomas is located within ZIP code 56058 based in Le Sueur. Nearby places include Le Sueur, Lexington, Le Center, Heidelberg, Belle Plaine, Henderson, and St. Thomas Wildlife Management Area.

The community had a post office from 1872 to 1902, and a station on the former Chicago, St. Paul, Minneapolis and Omaha Railway.
