= Minnesota State Highway 99 =

State highway in Minnesota, United States

Trunk Highway 99
- MN 99 highlighted in red

Route information
- Maintained by MnDOT
- Length: 40.098 mi (64.531 km)
- Existed: 1933–present
- Tourist routes: Minnesota River Valley Scenic Byway

Major junctions
- West end: MN 111 at Nicollet
- US 169 / MN 22 at St. Peter; MN 112 at Le Center; MN 13 at Montgomery Township
- East end: MN 21 at Erin Township

Location
- Country: United States
- State: Minnesota
- Counties: Nicollet, Le Sueur, Rice

Highway system
- Minnesota Trunk Highway System; Interstate; US; State; Legislative; Scenic
← MN 97	→ MN 100

Minnesota State Highway 99 (MN 99) is a 40.098-mile-long (64.531 km) highway in south-central Minnesota, which runs from its intersection with State Highway 111 in Nicollet and continues east to its eastern terminus at its intersection with State Highway 21 in Erin Township, near the city of Faribault.

MN 99 passes through the cities of St. Peter and Le Center.

== Route description ==
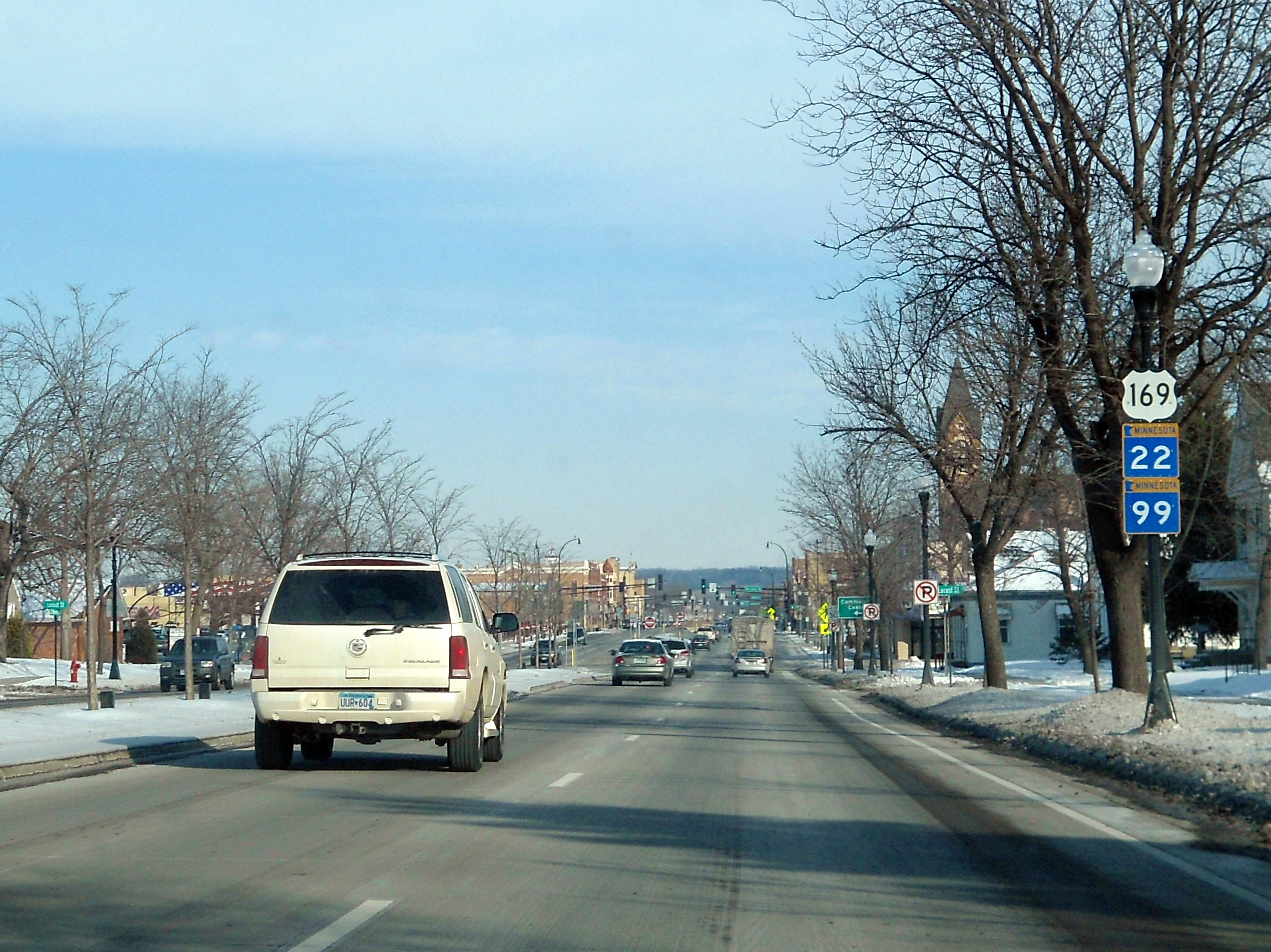
MN 99 concurrent with US 169 and MN 22 in Saint Peter

Highway 99 serves as an east–west route in south-central Minnesota between Nicollet, St. Peter, Cleveland, Le Center, and Faribault.

The route is also known as 3rd Street in the town of Nicollet.

Highway 99 follows Minnesota Avenue for 16 blocks in the city of St. Peter. The route is concurrent with U.S. Highway 169 and State Highway 22 throughout this length.

The route crosses the Minnesota River at St. Peter.

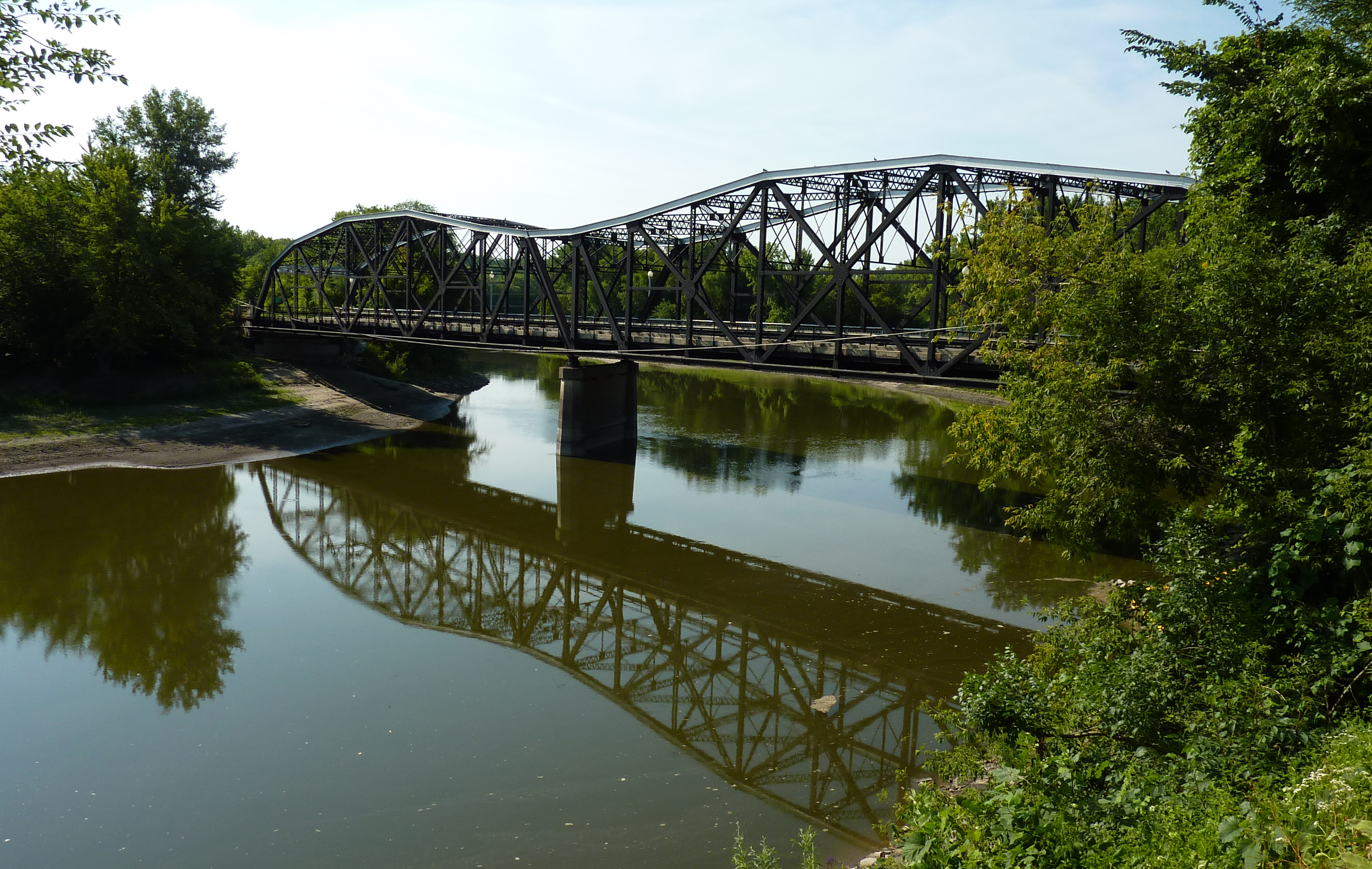
The Broadway Bridge carries Highway 99 over the Minnesota River at St. Peter.

Highway 99 is also known as Derrynane Street in the city of Le Center.

== History ==
Highway 99 was authorized on April 22, 1933. It was posted in 1934 and included parts of what were previously State Highways 7 and 21. It was paved between Nicollet and Le Center at this time. The section between Le Center and Highway 13 was paved in 1939, and the last section between Highway 13 and Highway 21 was paved in 1952.

Until the mid-1950s, Highway 99 turned directly north at Cleveland along what is now County Road 15 to intersect Highway 112. A shortcut heading northeast to Le Center was begun in 1953 and completed by 1956.

== Major intersections ==
County	Location	mi	km	Destinations	Notes
Nicollet	Nicollet	0.000	0.000	US 14 – Mankato, New Ulm	Programmed mile 0; closed in 2015
Nicollet	Nicollet	0.520	0.837	MN 111 (Main Street) to US 14 – Gaylord	Current western terminus
Nicollet	St. Peter	11.721	18.863	Nicollet Avenue	Formerly MN 333
Nicollet	St. Peter	12.337	19.854	US 169 south – Mankato	West end of US 169 overlap
Nicollet	St. Peter			MN 22 / Minnesota River Valley Scenic Byway – Mankato Regional Airport	West end of MN 22 / Minnesota River Valley Scenic Byway overlap
Nicollet	St. Peter	13.376	21.527	US 169 north / MN 22 north to CSAH 5 – Le Sueur	East end of US 169 / MN 22 overlap
Minnesota River		13.414– 13.494	21.588– 21.716	Broadway Bridge	
Le Sueur	Kasota Township	14.369	23.125	CSAH 23 / Minnesota River Valley Scenic Byway – Ottawa	East end of Minnesota River Valley Scenic Byway overlap
Le Sueur	Lexington Township	25.393	40.866	CSAH 22 west – Le Sueur	Formerly MN 112
Le Sueur	Montgomery Township	32.579	52.431	MN 13 – New Prague, Waterville	
Rice	Erin Township	40.618	65.368	MN 21 – Faribault, Montgomery	
1.000 mi = 1.609 km; 1.000 km = 0.621 mi: Closed/former; Concurrency terminus
