= St. Henry, Minnesota =

Unincorporated community in Minnesota, US

- Unincorporated community
- Location within Minnesota Location within the United States
- Coordinates: 44°23′03″N 93°47′19″W
- Country: United States
- State: Minnesota
- County: Le Sueur
- Township: Sharon
- Elevation: 1,010 ft (310 m)
- Time zone: UTC-6 (Central (CST))
  - Summer (DST): UTC-5 (CDT)
- ZIP code: 56058
- Area code: 507
- GNIS feature ID: 654925

St. Henry is an unincorporated community in Sharon Township, Le Sueur County, Minnesota, United States.

The community is located along State Highway 112 (MN 112) near its junction with 261st Avenue / Silver Lake Road (County 112).

Nearby places include Le Center, Le Sueur, Cleveland, Lexington, and Ottawa.

ZIP codes 56057 (Le Center) and 56058 (Le Sueur) meet near St. Henry.

The community is named for the Catholic church built by its first settlers. Its post office operated from 1870 to 1877, and 1880 to 1902.
