= Lexington, Le Sueur County, Minnesota =

Unincorporated community in Minnesota, US

Lexington, Minnesota
- Unincorporated community
- Location within Minnesota Location within the United States
- Coordinates: 44°26′33″N 93°42′09″W
- Country: United States
- State: Minnesota
- County: Le Sueur
- Township: Lexington
- Elevation: 1,033 ft (315 m)
- Time zone: UTC-6 (Central (CST))
  - Summer (DST): UTC-5 (CDT)
- ZIP code: 56057
- Area code: 507
- GNIS feature ID: 654795

Lexington is an unincorporated community in Lexington Township, Le Sueur County, Minnesota, United States.

The community is located along Le Sueur County Road 26 (Lexington Road), near its junctions with County Roads 5 and 32.

Lexington is located within ZIP code 56057 based in Le Center. Nearby places include Le Center, Montgomery, St. Thomas, Heidelberg, St. Henry, and Cordova.

Lexington had a station on the former Minneapolis and St. Louis Railroad. Lexington was platted in 1857, and named directly or indirectly after Lexington, Massachusetts. The community had a post office from 1856 to 1907.
