= Minnesota State Highway 112 =

State highway in Minnesota, United States

Trunk Highway 112
- MN 112 highlighted in red

Route information
- Maintained by MnDOT
- Length: 15.012 mi (24.159 km)
- Existed: April 22, 1933–2019

Major junctions
- West end: US 169 at Le Sueur
- MN 93 at Le Sueur
- East end: MN 99 near Le Center

Location
- Country: United States
- State: Minnesota
- Counties: Le Sueur

Highway system
- Minnesota Trunk Highway System; Interstate; US; State; Legislative; Scenic
| ← MN 111 | → MN 113 |

Minnesota State Highway 112 (MN 112) was a 15.012-mile-long (24.159 km) highway in south-central Minnesota, which ran from its interchange with U.S. Highway 169 in the city of Le Sueur and continued south and then east to its eastern terminus at its intersection with State Highway 99 in Lexington Township near the city of Le Center.

== Route description ==
State Highway 112 served as a north–south and an east–west route between the cities of Le Sueur and Le Center in south-central Minnesota.

Highway 112 changed direction to east–west in Ottawa Township and continued as east–west to its eastern terminus near the city limits of Le Center.

The highway was officially marked as an east–west route by its highway shields from beginning to end.

In the city of Le Sueur, Highway 112 followed Commerce Street, Main Street, Bridge Street, and Ferry Street.

The Dr. William W. Mayo House museum is located near the junction of Highway 93 and old Highway 112 in the city of Le Sueur. It is designated as a state historic site.

The route was legally defined as Route 123 in the Minnesota Statutes. It was not marked with this number.

== History ==
Highway 112 was authorized on April 22, 1933.

The route was paved by 1940.

A section of Main Street (formerly Highway 112) in the city of Le Sueur was originally part of old U.S. Highway 169 until the new U.S. 169 bypass was constructed west of town in the early 1960s.

It was announced on April 19, 2019 that the highway was handed over to Le Sueur County. It was renamed to Le Sueur County Road 22 and reconstructed.

== Major intersections ==
The entire route is in Le Sueur County.

| Location | mi | km | Destinations | Notes |
|---|---|---|---|---|
| Le Sueur | 0.000 | 0.000 | US 169 – St. Peter | |
| Le Sueur | 1.647 | 2.651 | MN 93 north – US 169 | |
| Lexington Township | 14.990 | 24.124 | MN 99 – Le Center, Cleveland, St. Peter | |
1.000 mi = 1.609 km; 1.000 km = 0.621 mi
