= Winco Inc. =

Power generator company in Minnesota

Winco Incorporated
- Type: Private
- Industry: Manufacturing
- Founded: 1927
- Founder: John and Gerhard Albers
- Headquarters: Le Center, Minnesota
- Key people: Dan Call, CEO
- Products: Generators
- Parent: DYNA Technology Incorporated
- Website: www.wincogen.com Facebook

Winco Incorporated is a power generator manufacturing company based in Le Center, Minnesota with its sister company Winpower.

== History ==
In 1927, John and Gerhard Albers invented Wincharger to provide power to their rural farm in Cherokee, Iowa. In 1935, Wincharger was incorporated and manufacturing was moved to Sioux City, Iowa. Wincharger Incorporated became a wholly owned subsidiary of Zenith Radio Corporation and soon had generators all over the world. In 1968, AMICOR acquired Wincharger Company and changed the name to Winco. Manufacturing was moved to Le Center, Minnesota in 1977. In 1985, Control Data purchased Winco and joined a group of companies under the name Earth Energy Systems. The Winco division of Earth Energy Systems was sold to Zaidan Holdings of Montreal, Quebec, Canada. After working there for about six years as president, Ralph Call purchased Winco and became chairman and CEO.
