= Minnesota State Highway 93 =

State highway in Minnesota, United States

Trunk Highway 93
- MN 93 highlighted in red

Route information
- Maintained by MnDOT
- Length: 5.599 mi (9.011 km)
- Existed: 1963–present
- Tourist routes: Minnesota River Valley Scenic Byway

Major junctions
- South end: CSAH 22 at Le Sueur
- US 169 near Le Sueur
- North end: MN 19 at Henderson

Location
- Country: United States
- State: Minnesota
- Counties: Sibley, Le Sueur

Highway system
- Minnesota Trunk Highway System; Interstate; US; State; Legislative; Scenic
| ← MN 92 | → I-94 |

Minnesota State Highway 93 (MN 93) is a 5.599-mile-long (9.011 km) highway in south-central Minnesota, which runs from its intersection with Le Sueur County Road 22 (Main Street) at Le Sueur and continues north to its northern terminus at its intersection with State Highway 19 in Henderson. MN 93 connects the cities of Le Sueur and Henderson.

== Route description ==
Highway 93 serves as a north–south route in south-central Minnesota between Le Sueur and Henderson.

The route crosses the Minnesota River at Le Sueur. Highway 93 also parallels the Minnesota River.

Highway 93 runs concurrent briefly with U.S. Highway 169 near the city of Le Sueur.

The Dr. William W. Mayo House museum is located near the junction of Main Street (CSAH 22) and Highway 93 in Le Sueur. It is designated as a state historic site.

Highway 93 is also known as South 5th Street in Henderson.

The route is legally defined as Legislative Route 259 in the Minnesota Statutes. It is not marked with this number.

== History ==
The present day Highway 93 was authorized in 1963. Previously, this route was known as State Highway 259 from 1949 to 1963.

From 1933 to 1963, the route number "Minnesota 93" was used on a different state route between Redwood Falls and Sleepy Eye. That route was replaced by extensions of present-day State Highways 67 and 68.

The present day Highway 93 between Le Sueur and Henderson was paved by 1953.

== Major intersections ==
| County | Location | mi | km | Destinations | Notes |
|---|---|---|---|---|---|
| Le Sueur | Le Sueur | 0.000 | 0.000 | CSAH 22 / Minnesota River Valley Scenic Byway | Formerly MN 112 |
| Minnesota River | | 0.076– 0.156 | 0.122– 0.251 | Highway 93 Bridge | |
| Sibley | Henderson Township | 0.825 | 1.328 | US 169 / CSAH 8 | South end of US 169 overlap |
| Sibley | Henderson Township | 1.700 | 2.736 | US 169 | North end of US 169 overlap |
| Sibley | Henderson | 5.600 | 9.012 | MN 19 / CSAH 6 / Minnesota River Valley Scenic Byway | |
1.000 mi = 1.609 km; 1.000 km = 0.621 mi: Concurrency terminus
