= Martin Malone =

Martin Malone may refer to:

- Martin Malone (baseball), baseball pitcher
- Martin Malone (author), Irish novelist and short story writer
- Martin M. Malone (1888–1962), member of the Minnesota Senate

== See also ==
- Marty Malone, member of the Montana House of Representatives
