= Minnesota State Highway 21 =

State highway in Minnesota, United States

Trunk Highway 21
- MN 21 highlighted in red

Route information
- Maintained by MnDOT
- Length: 38.370 mi (61.751 km)
- Existed: 1920–present

Major junctions
- South end: MN 60 / CR 48 at Faribault
- MN 3 at Faribault; I-35 at Faribault; MN 99 at Erin Township; MN 13 / MN 19 at New Prague; MN 282 at Jordan
- North end: US 169 at Jordan

Location
- Country: United States
- State: Minnesota
- Counties: Rice, Le Sueur, Scott

Highway system
- Minnesota Trunk Highway System; Interstate; US; State; Legislative; Scenic
← MN 20	→ MN 22

Minnesota State Highway 21 (MN 21) is a 38.370-mile-long (61.751 km) highway in Minnesota, which runs from its intersection with State Highway 60 in Faribault and continues north to its northern terminus at its interchange with U.S. Highway 169 in Jordan, southwest of Shakopee.

== Route description ==
State Highway 21 serves as a north–south route between Faribault, Montgomery, New Prague, and Jordan.

Highway 21 is also known as:

- Broadway Street in Jordan
- Helena Boulevard in Scott County
- 4th Avenue N.W. in New Prague
- Lyndale Avenue in Faribault

The Lyndale Avenue portion in Faribault is built as a four-lane divided highway.

The southern terminus for Highway 21 is its intersection with State Highway 60 in Faribault. Highway 21 becomes Rice County Road 48 upon crossing its intersection with Highway 60.

== History ==
State Highway 21 was authorized in 1920, running from Zumbrota to St. Peter. In 1934, the segment east of Faribault became State Highway 60, and the segment west of Shieldsville became State Highway 99. Highway 21 was then extended northwest to Highway 13 at Montgomery, then north through New Prague to Jordan.

The southernmost section of Highway 21 through Faribault is second-generation old U.S. Highway 65 (constructed in the late 1950s), which was connected to a divided highway coming off Interstate Highway 35 in the 1960s.

Highway 21 was paved north of State Highway 19 by 1940. The remainder of Highway 21 was paved in the late 1940s.

== Major intersections ==
County	Location	mi	km	Destinations	Notes
Rice	Faribault	0.000	0.000	MN 60 (4th Street) / CSAH 48 / I-35 BL south / I-35 Alt. south – Owatonna, Kenyon, Mankato	South end of Alt. I-35 and BL 35 overlap
Rice	Faribault	1.165	1.875	MN 3 (20th Street Northwest) / Park Avenue – Northfield	
Rice	Faribault	1.884– 2.121	3.032– 3.413	I-35 / I-35 BL ends – Minneapolis, Saint Paul, Albert Lea	Interchange; north end of BL 35 overlap
Rice	Wells Township	2.537	4.083	CSAH 46 / I-35 Alt. north	North end of Alt. I-35 overlap
Rice	Erin Township	9.153	14.730	MN 99 – Le Center	
Le Sueur	Montgomery	18.370	29.564	MN 13 south / CR 161 – Waterville	South end of MN 13 concurrency
Le Sueur–Scott county line	New Prague	26.407	42.498	MN 13 north / MN 19 to US 169 – Northfield	North end of MN 13 concurrency
Scott	Jordan	35.829	57.661	MN 282 (2nd Street)	
Scott	Jordan	36.673	59.019	US 169 – Shakopee	
1.000 mi = 1.609 km; 1.000 km = 0.621 mi: Concurrency terminus
