= Methodist Episcopal Church (Ottawa, Minnesota) =

Historic church in Minnesota, United States

- U.S. National Register of Historic Places
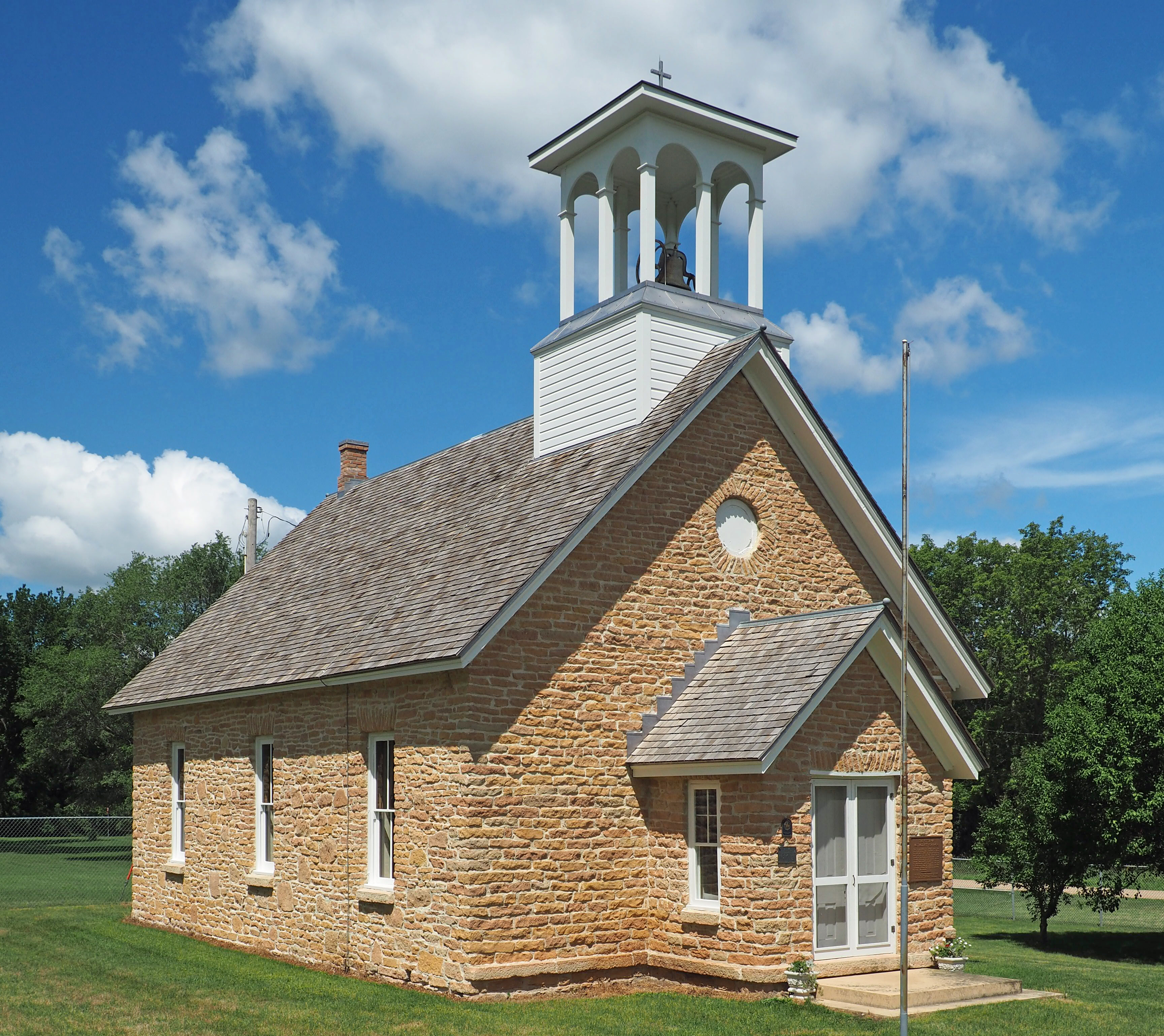
- The Methodist Episcopal Church viewed from the southeast

- Location within Minnesota Location within the United States
- Location: 39024 Whittier Street, Ottawa, Minnesota
- Coordinates: 44°23′3″N 93°56′52″W
- Area: less than one acre
- Built: 1859
- MPS: Ottawa Stone Buildings TR
- NRHP reference No.: 82004697
- Added to NRHP: March 15, 1982

Methodist Episcopal Church, often called the Little Stone Church, is a historic church in Ottawa, Minnesota, United States. It was one of the three oldest German Methodist congregations in Minnesota and was built in 1859 in locally quarried pink stone. The building closed in 1952, but was acquired by the LeSueur County Historical Society in 1967 and now houses artifacts.

It was listed on the National Register of Historic Places in 1982.
