= Davisco Foods International =

American food company

Davisco Foods International, Inc.
- Company type: Subsidiary
- Founded: 1943
- Headquarters: HQ in Le Sueur, Minnesota;
- Key people: Jon Davis, CEO
- Website: www.daviscofoods.com

Davisco Foods is a company headquartered in Le Sueur, Minnesota. It was founded in 1943. The company has since expanded to include sales offices in Minneapolis, Geneva, Shanghai and strategic partners in the Middle East, Japan, and Africa. Davisco Foods' main products are cheese and whey.

Davisco Foods International was managed until 2012 by Stanley's son, Mark Davis. Mark's son, Jon Davis, was appointed CEO from January 1, 2012. They also own Cambria, the sole producer of quartz work surfaces in the United States.

== History ==
=== 1943–1953 ===
On August 1, 1943, Stanley Davis decided to buy the St. Peter Creamery, a dairy company located in his hometown of St. Peter, Minnesota. Harvey Parson, Davis's former teacher, was a partner in the creamery for six months, as was Eiler Grand after that. When Parsons and Grand left to start their own companies elsewhere, Davis became the sole owner of the company.

In 1944, World War II brought a sudden change to the dairy markets; the government wanted skim milk to ship overseas and began rationing butter. Demand and prices for dairy products were high during this time, permanently changing both the market and the business model of St. Peter Creamery.

=== 1953–1963 ===
When prices began to drop during the 1950s, the St. Peter Creamery faced many challenges. In order to continue running the company, Stan Davis decided to purchase a dryer. In 1959, Stan Davis's son Mark began working for the company as a driver for the new bulk milk pickup route.

=== 1963–1973 ===
The dryer installed in 1956 made it possible for the St. Peter Creamery to service increasingly large milk routes by the early 1960s. Eventually, St. Peter was servicing the Bernadotte, Blue Earth, Cleveland, Mankato, Nicollet, Pemberton, and St. Clair routes.

The largest consolidation came in 1969 when Stan Davis and Allen Cords, former classmates in dairy school at the University of Minnesota, decided to combine the milk supplies of the St. Peter Creamery and the Le Sueur Cheese Company. Stan Davis, Mark Davis, and Allen Cords each owned one-third of the new business, and Mark Davis became the manager of Le Sueur Cheese.

In 1970, the cheese plant in Le Sueur was expanded and another partnership was established with Glen Anderson, a former employee. This led to the company taking ownership of another dryer, this time at a plant in Nicollet, Minnesota .

=== 1973–1983 ===
In 1973, a unique partnership was formed with Fromagerie Bongrain (USA) Inc., a subsidiary of Bongrain-Gerard, S.A., based in Guyancourt, France. The company researched several United States locations and chose Le Sueur as the site for production of its Camembert and Brie cheeses. For eight years the American and French cheese plants operated side by side in the Le Sueur Cheese building, until finally the value of international currency made the venture unprofitable.

During the 1970s, the St. Peter Creamery ended butter production and stopped taking milk from farmers. Its capacity as a specialty drying plant tripled when a used spray dryer was rebuilt and installed in 1978, making necessary new warehouse and powder storage facilities in 1981. Another dryer was also added at the Nicollet plant.

=== 1983–1993 ===
In December 1983, Stan Davis purchased a creamery in Lake Norden, South Dakota. It was a move that turned the business away from traditional ideas of profit in the dairy industry; the Lake Norden plant would collect no milk, gaining its profits solely from whey collected from the surrounding cheese plants. The Lake Norden site was immediately expanded to include an additional spray dryer and space for liquid and dry storage.

In 1986, the three Davis companies - St. Peter Creamery, Inc.; Le Sueur Cheese Company, Inc.; and Nicollet Food Products, Inc. - merged to form Davisco Foods International, Inc. This move unified the company, which now had plants in four locations. Shortly after, all four of Stan Davis's sons entered the family business.

In 1991, Davisco Foods International acquired the Welsh company that it was tied to in the production of its whey protein isolate. During the same year, Mark Davis decided to build a cheese plant in Jerome, Idaho, because there was a good milk supply in need of a processing plant.

In 1993, the company decided to move the old St. Peter Creamery, now a part of Davisco's Food Ingredient Division, to Le Sueur, Minnesota. The new plant was designed to handle the increased volume and diversity demanded by a quickly changing food industry.

=== 1993–2003 ===
The 1990s brought rapid change to Davisco Foods International. The whey protein isolate responsible for increased company profits in the 1980s, found new applications in the consumer market.

In 1994, the fully automated cheese plant in Jerome received honors as Food Engineering Magazine's New Plant of the Year.

In 1995, Pauline Olson joined Davisco Food International's management team as the Director of Sales and Marketing. Also during this time, the company hired new sales personnel and full-time applications scientists.

In 1998, Jerome Cheese Company was selected as the prime site for the construction of a new whey processing facility. The operation became the only commercial whey fractionating plant in the United States to use chromatography methods. The addition of an automated cheddaring system later in 1998 increased plant capacity.

As the company grew and the need for sales and marketing resources increased, Davisco Foods International moved its original Le Sueur sales headquarters to Eden Prairie, Minnesota. The company later added sales offices in Mexico City, Mexico, and Geneva, Switzerland.

=== 2003–present ===
During the 2000s, Davisco Foods International launched a consumer line of whey protein products, beginning with the sales of a whey protein isolate in March 2004. At the end of 2006, the company began sales of two additional consumer products, a hydrolyzed whey protein isolate supplement) and BioZzz (alpha-lactalbumin). Davisco Foods International, Inc. announced the appointment of Jon Davis as president and chief executive officer effective January 1, 2012.

In 2014, Agropur acquired the processing assets of Davisco Foods International.

== Sponsorship ==
- Arnold Classic
- Twin Cities Marathon

== Industrial Food Products ==
- Cheese
  - American types such as Cheddar, Monterey Jack, Colby and reduced fat varieties of those types
  - Soft Italian types such as Mozzarella and Provolone
- Alpha-lactalbumin
- Beta-lactoglobulin
- Glycomacropeptide (GMP)
- Lactose Powder
- Sweet Cream
- Whey Cream
- Fractionated Whey Products
- Lactose
- Condensed Whey
