= German Evangelical Salem Church =

Historic church in Minnesota, United States

- U.S. National Register of Historic Places
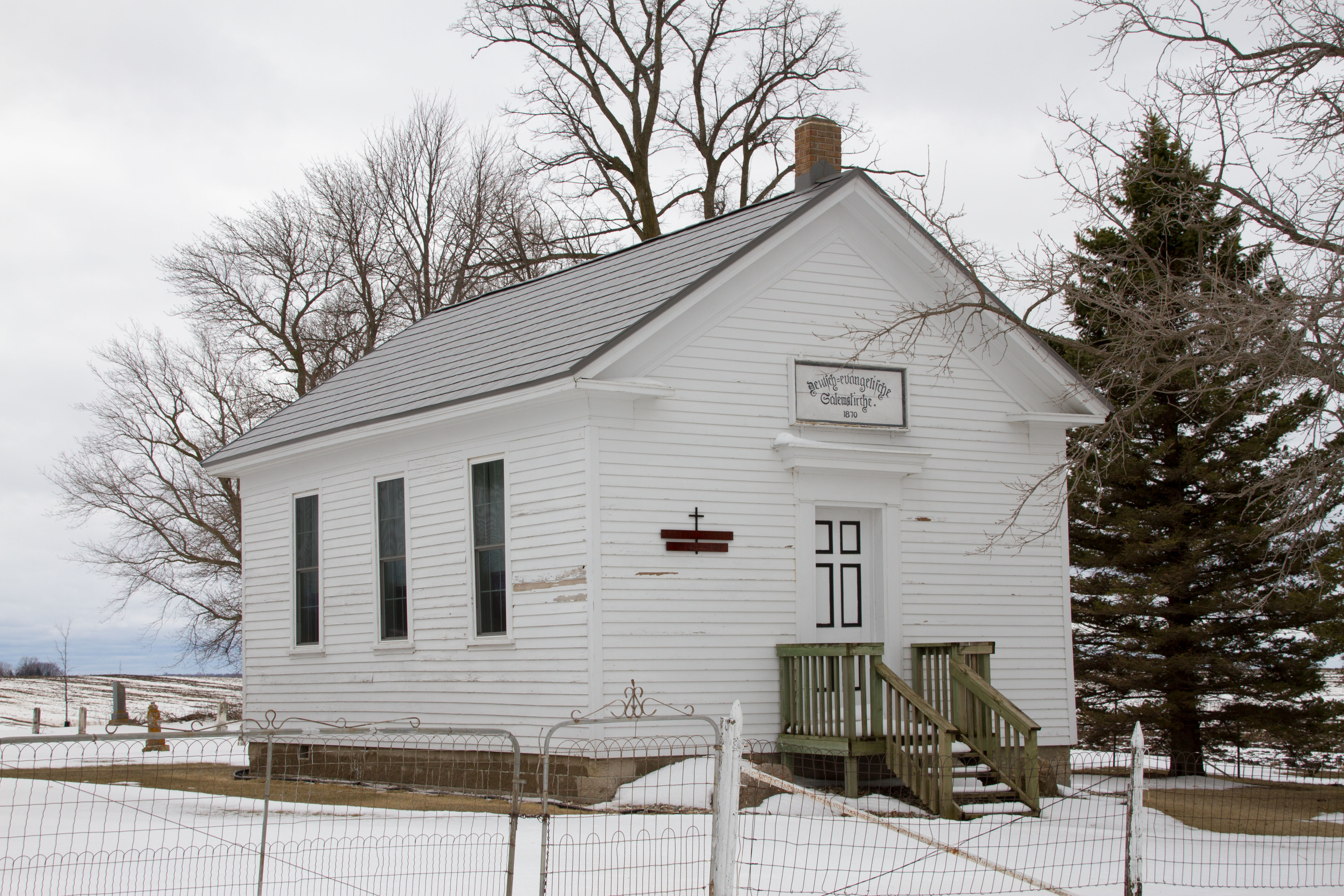

- Location within Minnesota Location within the United States
- Nearest city: Le Sueur, Minnesota
- Coordinates: 44°29′8″N 93°47′16″W
- Area: less than one acre
- Built: 1870
- MPS: Le Sueur County MRA
- NRHP reference No.: 82004696
- Added to NRHP: March 15, 1982

German Evangelical Salem Church is a historic church in Tyrone Township, Le Sueur County, Minnesota. It was built in 1870 by German immigrants who settled and farmed northwestern Le Sueur County, and was added to the National Register in 1982. It was nominated for being a rare surviving example of an early rural church built to anchor an immigrant farming community.
