= Laura Andrews Rhodes =

American opera singer

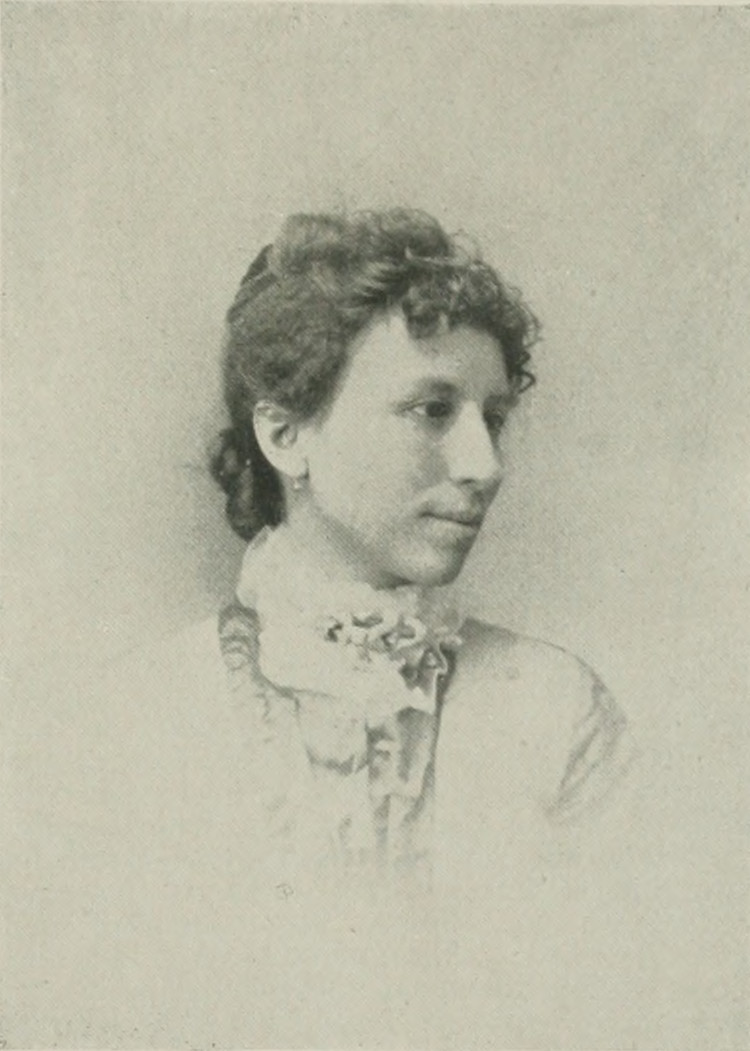
Laura Andrews Rhodes, A woman of the century

Laura Andrews Rhodes (October 1, 1854 – February 5, 1909) was an American operatic soprano.

== Early life ==
Laura Andrews was born in Casey, Illinois, on October 1, 1854. She was the second oldest daughter of Rev. John Redding Andrews, a Methodist minister, and Delilah Andrews, the parents of the Andrews family, of which the well-known Andrews Opera Company was mainly composed. Initially John Redding Andrews went to southern Minnesota from Russellville, Illinois, in 1856, with his wife and their four oldest children. John Andrews' father, Thomas, was the son of an English West Indies planter and his Spanish wife. Thomas went to Virginia during the Revolutionary War; he was present at the siege of Yorktown, and married a Virginia girl. He migrated westward, going eventually to Indiana, where his son, John Redding, was born.

She possessed in a remarkable degree the musical ability which was the heritage of the Andrews family. She had a lyric soprano voice of great purity, richness and compass. She was sent to St. Paul to study music, so she could teach the younger children, including her youngest sister, Alice A. Andrews.

Among her instructors were Prof. W. N. Burritt, of Chicago, Prof. Lowenthal, of the Conservatoire de Paris, and Madam Corani, of the Milan Conservatory.

== Career ==
Laura Andrews Rhodes began her stage career with the Andrews Concert Company at the age of seventeen. In 1875, Charles Andrews, one of the four older brothers, organized the Andrews family concert troupe.

A few years later, the Andrews family organized as the Andrews Swiss Bell Ringers, Rhodes was the soprano bell ringer, becoming famous in that capacity. When the Andrews Opera Company was organized. Rhodes took the leading roles and for years was their prima donna, scoring success everywhere and winning applause in nearly every State in the Union.

In 1890, the constant strain of daily singing and the weariness of incessant travel brought on a severe attack of nervous prostration, from which she made a very tardy recovery. Although thus compelled to abandon the stage for a time, she was not idle, but was busily engaged in vocal teaching and in special solo work in the various Chautauqua assemblies of the Northwest.

== Personal life ==
Soon after starting her stage career, Laura Andrews married F. B. Rhodes, a druggist, who, at one of their entertainments, became enamored of her voice and speedily thereafter of herself. They were married within six months after the first meeting. Since their marriage F.B. Rhodes was connected with the opera company from time to time as business manager.

She died on February 5, 1909, in Sisseton, South Dakota, and is buried at St. Peter, Minnesota.
