= Erin Township, Rice County, Minnesota =

Erin Township, Minnesota
- Township
- Location within the state of Minnesota Erin Township, Minnesota (the United States)
- Coordinates: 44°25′19″N 93°27′55″W
- Country: United States
- State: Minnesota
- County: Rice

Area
  - Total: 36.2 sq mi (93.7 km^{2})
  - Land: 34.8 sq mi (90.1 km^{2})
  - Water: 1.4 sq mi (3.5 km^{2})
- Elevation: 1,145 ft (349 m)

Population (2000)
  - Total: 797
  - Density: 23/sq mi (8.8/km^{2})
- Time zone: UTC-6 (Central (CST))
  - Summer (DST): UTC-5 (CDT)
- FIPS code: 27-19682
- GNIS feature ID: 0664108

Erin Township is a township in Rice County, Minnesota, United States. The population was 797 at the 2000 census.

Minnesota State Highways 21 and 99 are two of the main routes in the township.

Settled in the 1850s, Erin Township derives its name from Erin, the literary name for Ireland.

== Geography ==
According to the United States Census Bureau, the township has a total area of 36.2 square miles (94 km^{2}), of which 34.8 square miles (90 km^{2}) is land and 1.4 square miles (3.6 km^{2}) (3.79%) is water.

== Demographics ==
As of the census of 2000, there were 797 people, 276 households, and 224 families residing in the township. The population density was 22.9 inhabitants per square mile (8.8/km^{2}). There were 311 housing units at an average density of 8.9 per square mile (3.4/km^{2}). The racial makeup of the township was 99.00% White, 0.13% African American, 0.50% from other races, and 0.38% from two or more races. Hispanic or Latino of any race were 0.75% of the population.

There were 276 households, out of which 37.3% had children under the age of 18 living with them, 72.5% were married couples living together, 3.3% had a female householder with no husband present, and 18.8% were non-families. 15.6% of all households were made up of individuals, and 4.7% had someone living alone who was 65 years of age or older. The average household size was 2.89 and the average family size was 3.24.

In the township the population was spread out, with 28.1% under the age of 18, 6.9% from 18 to 24, 28.7% from 25 to 44, 24.1% from 45 to 64, and 12.2% who were 65 years of age or older. The median age was 38 years. For every 100 females, there were 122.6 males. For every 100 females age 18 and over, there were 127.4 males.

The median income for a household in the township was $60,625, and the median income for a family was $65,625. Males had a median income of $39,375 versus $25,385 for females. The per capita income for the township was $23,495. About 3.9% of families and 4.1% of the population were below the poverty line, including none of those under age 18 and 12.5% of those age 65 or over.
