= Ottawa, Minnesota =

Unincorporated community in Minnesota, US

- Unincorporated community
- Ottawa TownHall

- Location within Minnesota Location within the United States
- Coordinates: 44°22′56″N 93°56′45″W
- Country: United States
- State: Minnesota
- County: Le Sueur
- Township: Ottawa
- Elevation: 797 ft (243 m)
- Time zone: UTC-6 (Central (CST))
  - Summer (DST): UTC-5 (CDT)
- ZIP code: 56058
- Area code: 507
- GNIS feature ID: 649040

Ottawa (/ˈɒtəwə/ OT-oh-wə) is an unincorporated community in Ottawa Township, Le Sueur County, Minnesota, United States.

The community is located south of Le Sueur at the junction of Le Sueur County Roads 23 and 36 (Ottawa Road). The Minnesota River and Cherry Creek meet at Ottawa. State Highway 112 (MN 112) is also in the immediate area.

Ottawa is located within ZIP code 56058 based in Le Sueur. Nearby places include Le Sueur, Kasota, St. Henry, Le Center, Cleveland, St. Peter, the Ottawa Bluffs Nature Preserve, and Ottawa Wildlife Management Area.

Ottawa had a station on the former Chicago, St. Paul, Minneapolis and Omaha Railway. The community was founded under the name of Minnewashta (from the Eastern Dakota language word mniwašte, meaning "good water"), but on June 20, 1856, it was surveyed and renamed Ottawa. The present name is for the Ottawa Indians.

Historical population
Census	Pop.	Note	%±
1900	246		—
U.S. Decennial Census
