= Alice A. Andrews =

American composer and director (1866-1946)

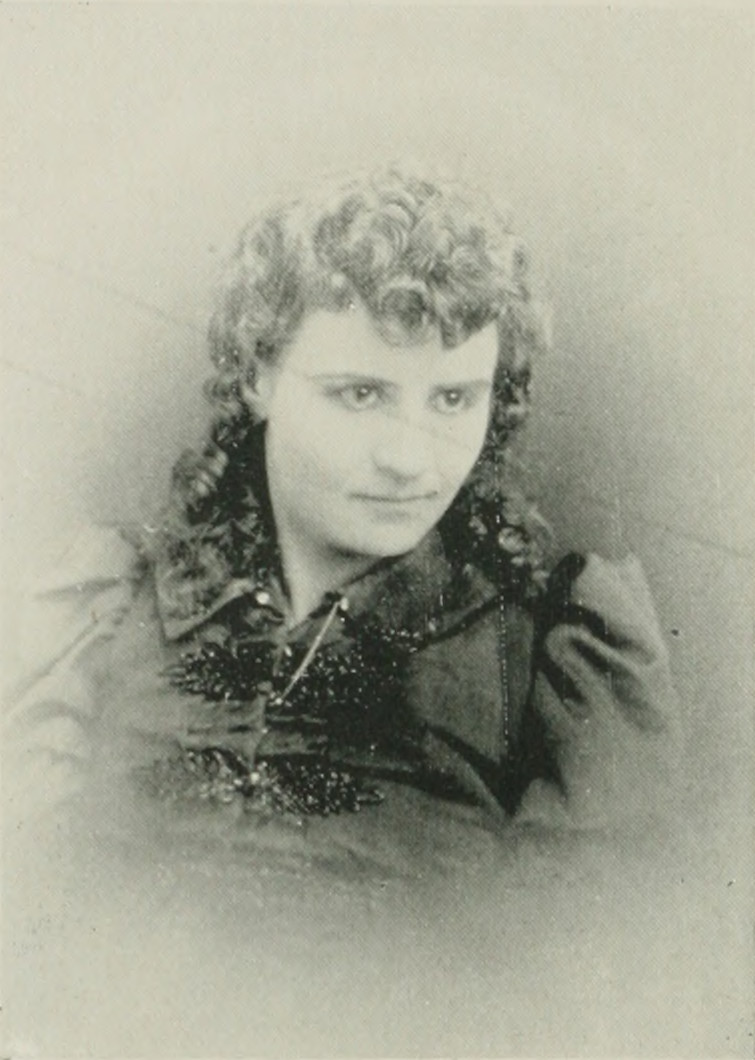
- Alice A. Andrews
- Born: 1866; Minnesota
- Died: 1946 (aged 79–80); California
- Other names: Alice Andrews Parker (after marriage)
- Occupations: pianist, composer, musical director, vocal coach
- Known for: Andrews Family Opera Company

Alice A. Andrews (1866–1946), later Alice A. Parker, was an American pianist, composer and musical director of the Andrews Family Opera. Later in life, she was a vocal coach and instructor in New York City.

== Early life ==
Andrews was born in St. Peter, Minnesota, the youngest of ten children of John Redding Andrews and Delilah Armstrong Andrews. Her father was a Methodist minister. She began performing with her family ensemble as a child, singing hymns in churches. She learned to play the family's melodeon from her older sister, Laura Andrews Rhodes.

== Career ==
Andrews was a member of her family's troupe, the Andrews Family Opera Company, organized by her older brother Charles Andrews in the 1870s. Alice Andrews played piano and directed the music. The troupe initially offered various entertainments in small towns, from operettas to a handbell choir and a cornet band. In the 1880s, they traded their bandwagon for a Pullman car, and began mounting English-language opera productions, complete with sets and costumes, mainly in the American midwest, though occasionally farther afield, in Texas, Pennsylvania, or Manitoba.

Willa Cather recalled seeing Andrews perform in Nebraska in 1888: "There was the Andrews Opera Company, for example; they usually had a good voice or two among them, a small orchestra and a painstaking conductor, who was also the pianist. What good luck for a country child to hear those tuneful old operas sung by people who were doing their best: The Bohemian Girl, The Chimes of Normandy, Martha, The Mikado."

Andrews also composed and transposed works for the company. "She has a remarkable talent for transposition," commented one contemporary account, "and could transpose music as soon as she could read it." In 1913 she was based in New York, coaching opera singers and teaching, when she traveled to a reunion of the surviving members of the Andrews Opera Company, in Mankato, Minnesota. She was still living in New York as a voice coach in 1929, and in 1945, a year before her death.

The Andrews family was fictionalized as the Angel family in the novel "The Black Angels" (1926) by Maud Hart Lovelace as well as the Wakefield family in a novel, Singing Wheels (1979), by descendant Cornelia Andrews DuBois.

== Personal life ==
In 1892 Andrews married the comedian and theatre manager, Charles A. "Chad" Parker, who performed with the Andrews Company. She died in 1946, in southern California. The Andrews Opera Company Papers are in the collection of the Minnesota Historical Society and at Minnesota State University at Mankato.
