= Montgomery, Minnesota =

City in Minnesota, United States

- City
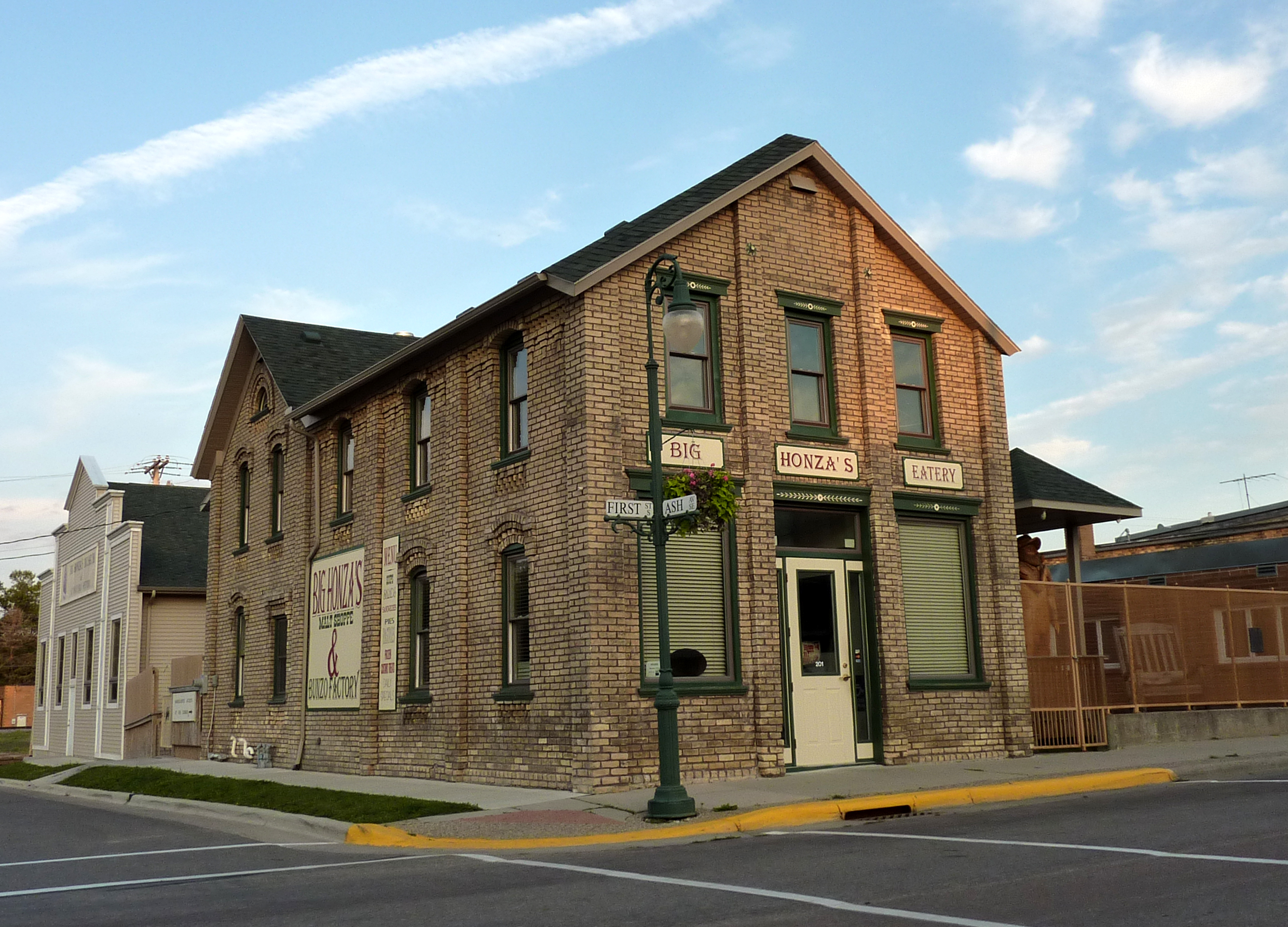
- The Westerman Lumber Office and House structure is listed on the National Register of Historic Places.
- Nickname: Kolacky Capital of the World
- Motto: Vitame Vas
- Location of Montgomery, Minnesota
- Coordinates: 44°26′42″N 93°34′47″W
- Country: United States
- State: Minnesota
- County: Le Sueur

Government
  - Type: Mayor - Council
  - Mayor: Thomas "Tom" Eisert Thomas Eisert Montgomery MN, cityofmontgomerymn.com

Area
  - Total: 2.51 sq mi (6.50 km^{2})
  - Land: 2.51 sq mi (6.50 km^{2})
  - Water: 0 sq mi (0.00 km^{2})
- Elevation: 1,093 ft (333 m)

Population (2020)
  - Total: 3,249
  - Density: 1,293.8/sq mi (499.55/km^{2})
- Time zone: UTC-6 (Central (CST))
  - Summer (DST): UTC-5 (CDT)
- ZIP code: 56069
- Area code: 507
- FIPS code: 27-43738
- GNIS feature ID: 2395381

Montgomery is a city in Le Sueur County, Minnesota, United States, 45 miles south of Minneapolis. It was named after Richard Montgomery, an Irish-American soldier who served as a major general in the Continental Army during the Revolutionary War. The population was 3,249 at the 2020 census.

== History ==
Montgomery was platted in 1877 when the Minneapolis and Saint Louis Railroad was extended to that point. Martin M. Malone (1888–1962), politician and businessman, was born in Montgomery.

== Geography ==
According to the United States Census Bureau, the city has a total area of 2.62 square miles (6.79 km^{2}), all land.

Minnesota State Highways 13 and 21 are two of the main routes in the city. Minnesota State Highway 99 is located directly to the south. Montgomery is 15 miles from Interstate 35.

The closest towns to Montgomery are: North - New Prague, South - Kilkenny, East - Lonsdale, West - Le Center. The closest major city is Faribault to the Southeast.

=== Climate ===
Climate data for Montgomery, Minnesota
Month	Jan	Feb	Mar	Apr	May	Jun	Jul	Aug	Sep	Oct	Nov	Dec	Year
Mean daily maximum °F (°C)	19 (−7)	26 (−3)	38 (3)	55 (13)	68 (20)	77 (25)	81 (27)	78 (26)	70 (21)	58 (14)	39 (4)	24 (−4)	53 (12)
Mean daily minimum °F (°C)	−1 (−18)	6 (−14)	19 (−7)	31 (−1)	45 (7)	55 (13)	58 (14)	56 (13)	45 (7)	34 (1)	20 (−7)	5 (−15)	31 (−1)
Average precipitation inches (mm)	0.76 (19)	0.52 (13)	1.62 (41)	2.34 (59)	3.40 (86)	4.42 (112)	3.86 (98)	4.68 (119)	2.97 (75)	2.14 (54)	1.71 (43)	0.72 (18)	29.14 (737)
Source: The Weather Channel

== Demographics ==
Historical population
Census	Pop.	Note	%±
1880	261		—
1890	1,086		316.1%
1900	979		−9.9%
1910	1,267		29.4%
1920	1,297		2.4%
1930	1,570		21.0%
1940	1,741		10.9%
1950	1,913		9.9%
1960	2,118		10.7%
1970	2,281		7.7%
1980	2,349		3.0%
1990	2,399		2.1%
2000	2,794		16.5%
2010	2,956		5.8%
2020	3,249		9.9%
U.S. Decennial Census; 2018 Estimate

=== 2020 census ===
As of the 2020 census, Montgomery had a population of 3,249. The median age was 37.0 years. 25.3% of residents were under the age of 18 and 15.9% of residents were 65 years of age or older. For every 100 females there were 102.1 males, and for every 100 females age 18 and over there were 102.8 males age 18 and over.

0.0% of residents lived in urban areas, while 100.0% lived in rural areas.

There were 1,350 households in Montgomery, of which 30.5% had children under the age of 18 living in them. Of all households, 43.8% were married-couple households, 23.3% were households with a male householder and no spouse or partner present, and 21.6% were households with a female householder and no spouse or partner present. About 32.6% of all households were made up of individuals and 14.8% had someone living alone who was 65 years of age or older.

There were 1,428 housing units, of which 5.5% were vacant. The homeowner vacancy rate was 1.5% and the rental vacancy rate was 3.6%.

Racial composition as of the 2020 census
Race	Number	Percent
White	2,925	90.0%
Black or African American	24	0.7%
American Indian and Alaska Native	16	0.5%
Asian	16	0.5%
Native Hawaiian and Other Pacific Islander	6	0.2%
Some other race	69	2.1%
Two or more races	193	5.9%
Hispanic or Latino (of any race)	254	7.8%

=== 2010 census ===
At the 2010 census, there were 2,956 people, 1,185 households and 760 families residing in the city. The population density was 1,128.2 inhabitants per square mile (435.6/km^{2}). There were 1,306 housing units at an average density of 498.5 per square mile (192.5/km^{2}). The racial makeup of the city was 94.4% White, 0.2% African American, 0.6% Native American, 0.4% Asian, 2.3% from other races, and 2.0% from two or more races. Hispanic or Latino of any race were 6.4% of the population.

There were 1,185 households, of which 33.5% had children under the age of 18 living with them, 47.4% were married couples living together, 10.5% had a female householder with no husband present, 6.2% had a male householder with no wife present, and 35.9% were non-families. 30.3% of all households were made up of individuals, and 11.4% had someone living alone who was 65 years of age or older. The average household size was 2.49 and the average family size was 3.07.

The median age was 35.1 years. 27.3% of residents were under the age of 18; 6.8% were between the ages of 18 and 24; 28.5% were from 25 to 44; 23.9% were from 45 to 64; and 13.4% were 65 years of age or older. The population was 50.6% male and 49.4% female.

=== 2000 census ===
At the 2000 census, there were 2,794 people, 1,105 households and 690 families residing in the city. The population density was 1,790.7 inhabitants per square mile (691.4/km^{2}). There were 1,137 housing units at an average density of 728.7 per square mile (281.4/km^{2}). The racial makeup of the city was 93.59% White, 0.32% African American, 0.25% Native American, 0.32% Asian, 4.29% from other races, and 1.22% from two or more races. Hispanic or Latino of any race were 9.77% of the population.

There were 1,105 households, of which 33.6% had children under the age of 18 living with them, 49.7% were married couples living together, 8.6% had a female householder with no husband present, and 37.5% were non-families. 32.8% of all households were made up of individuals, and 16.2% had someone living alone who was 65 years of age or older. The average household size was 2.52 and the average family size was 3.23.

28.7% of the population were under the age of 18, 9.4% from 18 to 24, 28.6% from 25 to 44, 19.3% from 45 to 64, and 14.0% who were 65 years of age or older. The median age was 34 years. For every 100 females, there were 98.7 males. For every 100 females age 18 and over, there were 98.5 males.

The median household income was $34,145 and the median family income was $48,011. Males had a median income of $30,707 compared with $23,977 for females. The per capita income was $16,128. About 8.1% of families and 11.6% of the population were below the poverty line, including 13.6% of those under age 18 and 18.3% of those age 65 or over.

== Economy ==
Seneca Foods (formerly Green Giant) has a freezing and canning facility in Montgomery. United Steel Products also has a large facility in town. The economy of the Montgomery area relies heavily on agriculture, and other assorted blue collar jobs.

== Government ==
Montgomery is in Minnesota's 2nd congressional district, represented by Angie Craig (DFL); Minnesota Senate district 22, represented by Rich Draheim (R); and Minnesota House district 22B, represented by Brian Pfarr (R). In terms of county politics, Montgomery is a part of Le Sueur County District #2 and represented by Joe Connolly.

== Education ==
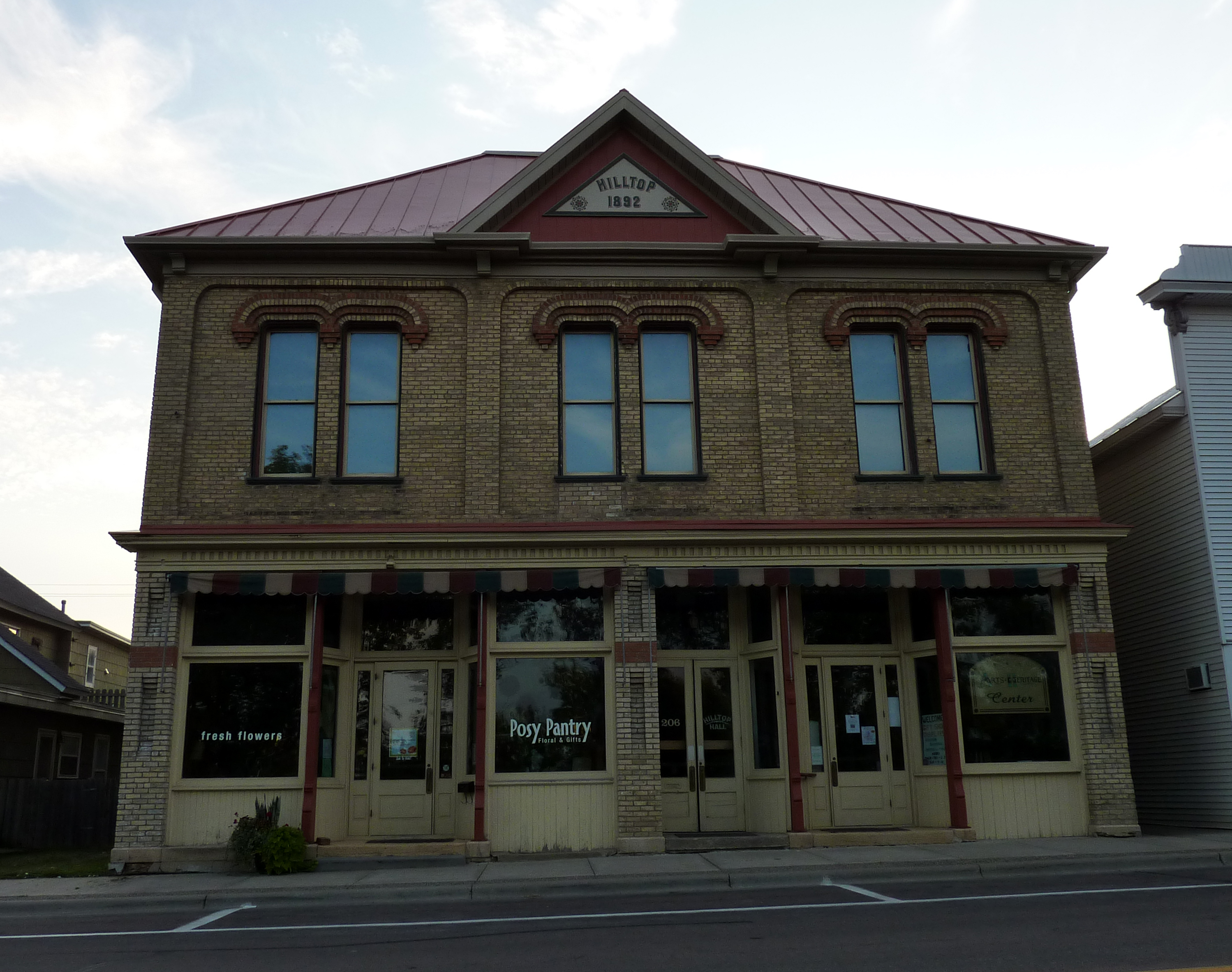
Hilltop Hall is listed on the National Register of Historic Places.

Montgomery is a part of the Tri-City United School District, ISD #2905. The district includes a grades 9-12 Tri-City United High School in Montgomery; K-8 campuses in Montgomery and Le Center; and a K-6 elementary school in Lonsdale. The district's sports teams, the Titans, are members of the Big 10 conference, and participate in baseball, softball, basketball, cross-country, hockey, tennis, track, football, cheerleading, wrestling, golf and volleyball.

The Most Holy Redeemer Catholic School is a parochial pre-K-8 school. Its sports teams, the Raiders, compete in the Tri-County Private School Conference in sports including volleyball, basketball, baseball and softball.

== Arts and culture ==
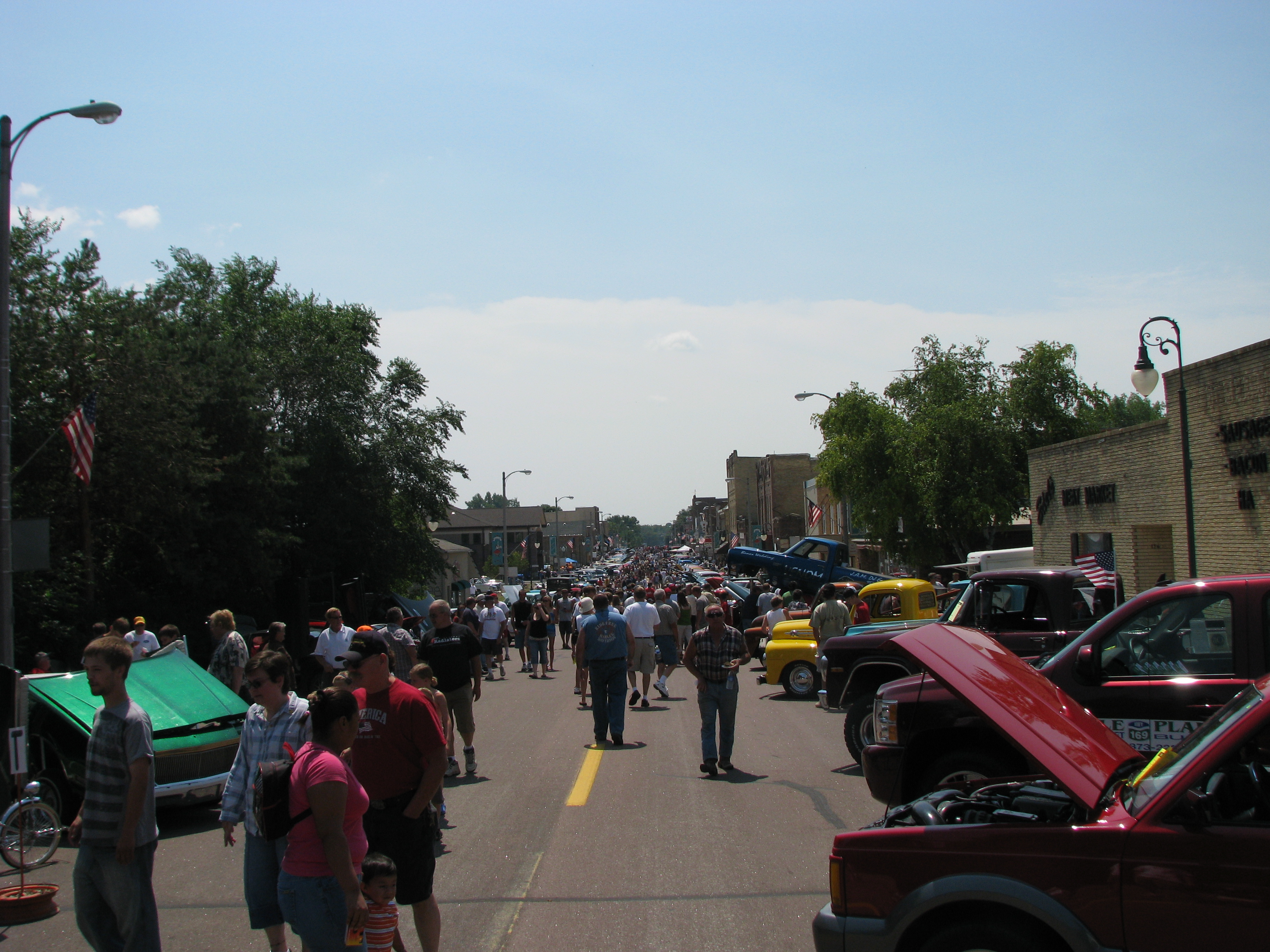
Downtown Montgomery during the 74th Annual Kolacky Days Festival

Montgomery celebrates its Czechoslovak heritage annually at the end of July with one of Minnesota's oldest festivals, Kolacky Days. The festival dates back to 1929, when an estimated 6,000 people visited Montgomery for the first Kolacky Day celebration, held on October 1.

"The Kolacky Day spirit reigned supreme from early Tuesday morning until a comparatively late hour Wednesday morning. More than 1,600 of the celebrated delicacies were devoured," according to a Montgomery Messenger account from the following week.

Events at the first celebration included a trap shooting tournament, a parade, sports and races, and a football game between Montgomery and Le Sueur Center (now Le Center).

In 1931 Miss Leatta Ehmke (later Leatta Trnka) was crowned the first Kolacky Queen by Mayor Henry Westerman. For the 1934 celebration, a novelty button, sold by the Kolacky girls, was devised and is still in use today. Following the attack on Pearl Harbor on December 7, 1941, Kolacky Day retreated to the background until the Montgomery Community Club revived the celebration in 1948. Kolacky Day officially became a summer festival in 1966 when the traditional date, the last Sunday in September, was dropped in favor of the first weekend in August. The earlier date and warmer weather brought huge crowds to the festival. In 1975, Kolacky Day became Kolacky Days and the event was held for the first time at the end of July. It is now celebrated on the fourth full weekend of that month. The shift was made at the urging of the Green Giant vegetable canning company, to avoid conflict with the busy corn-processing season.

Other annual events include the Torchlight Parade & Fireworks, the Masopust Festival also known as "The Czech Mardi Gras" and the Miss Czech-Slovak MN Pageant.

== Parks and recreation ==
=== Baseball ===
Montgomery's baseball tradition includes the amateur baseball team, known as the Mallards, the former high school Montgomery-Lonsdale Redbirds and now the Tri-City United Titans. The Mallards play in the Dakota Rice Scott Amateur Baseball League (DRS) under the direction of the Minnesota Baseball Association. The Mallards participated in the State Tournament in 1998, 1999, 2002, 2016 and 2022. They play their home games at Memorial Field, in Memorial Park.

The Redbirds played in the Minnesota River Conference under the direction of the Minnesota High School League. The Redbirds participated in a few State Tournaments and won the Class A State Championship for the 1998–99 season. Now the tradition continues with the consolidated Tri-City United School District.

=== Recreation ===
The Tri-City United Community Education Office provides the citizens of Montgomery as well as the rest of the school district with recreational opportunities for all ages.

=== City parks ===
- Memorial Park
- North Side
- West Side
- Veteran's Memorial Park

=== Nearby lakes ===
- Lake Pepin
- Lake Dora
- Clear Lake
- Gorman Lake
