= Montgomery Township, Le Sueur County, Minnesota =

Township in Minnesota, United States

Montgomery Township
- Township
- Location within the state of Minnesota Montgomery Township (the United States)
- Coordinates: 44°24′8″N 93°35′40″W
- Country: United States
- State: Minnesota
- County: Le Sueur

Area
  - Total: 34.6 sq mi (89.5 km^{2})
  - Land: 33.7 sq mi (87.2 km^{2})
  - Water: 0.89 sq mi (2.3 km^{2})
- Elevation: 1,060 ft (323 m)

Population (2000)
  - Total: 745
  - Density: 22/sq mi (8.5/km^{2})
- Time zone: UTC-6 (Central (CST))
  - Summer (DST): UTC-5 (CDT)
- ZIP code: 56069
- Area code: 507
- FIPS code: 27-43756
- GNIS feature ID: 0665013

Montgomery Township is a township in Le Sueur County, Minnesota, United States. The population was 745 at the 2000 census.

Montgomery Township was organized in 1859.

== Geography ==
According to the United States Census Bureau, the township has a total area of 34.6 square miles (89.5 km^{2}), of which 33.7 square miles (87.2 km^{2}) is land and 0.9 square mile (2.3 km^{2}) (2.58%) is water.

== Demographics ==
As of the census of 2000, there were 745 people, 272 households, and 206 families residing in the township. The population density was 22.1 people per square mile (8.5/km^{2}). There were 287 housing units at an average density of 8.5/sq mi (3.3/km^{2}). The racial makeup of the township was 99.33% White, 0.13% Asian, 0.13% Pacific Islander, and 0.40% from two or more races. Hispanic or Latino of any race were 1.21% of the population.

There were 272 households, out of which 33.8% had children under the age of 18 living with them, 68.4% were married couples living together, 2.2% had a female householder with no husband present, and 23.9% were non-families. 21.3% of all households were made up of individuals, and 7.7% had someone living alone who was 65 years of age or older. The average household size was 2.74 and the average family size was 3.20.

In the township the population was spread out, with 28.9% under the age of 18, 6.7% from 18 to 24, 25.5% from 25 to 44, 24.2% from 45 to 64, and 14.8% who were 65 years of age or older. The median age was 38 years. For every 100 females, there were 112.9 males. For every 100 females age 18 and over, there were 118.1 males.

The median income for a household in the township was $45,227, and the median income for a family was $55,417. Males had a median income of $36,477 versus $21,667 for females. The per capita income for the township was $20,180. About 1.9% of families and 3.5% of the population were below the poverty line, including 4.9% of those under age 18 and 4.2% of those age 65 or over.
