= Le Sueur County Courthouse and Jail =

- U.S. National Register of Historic Places
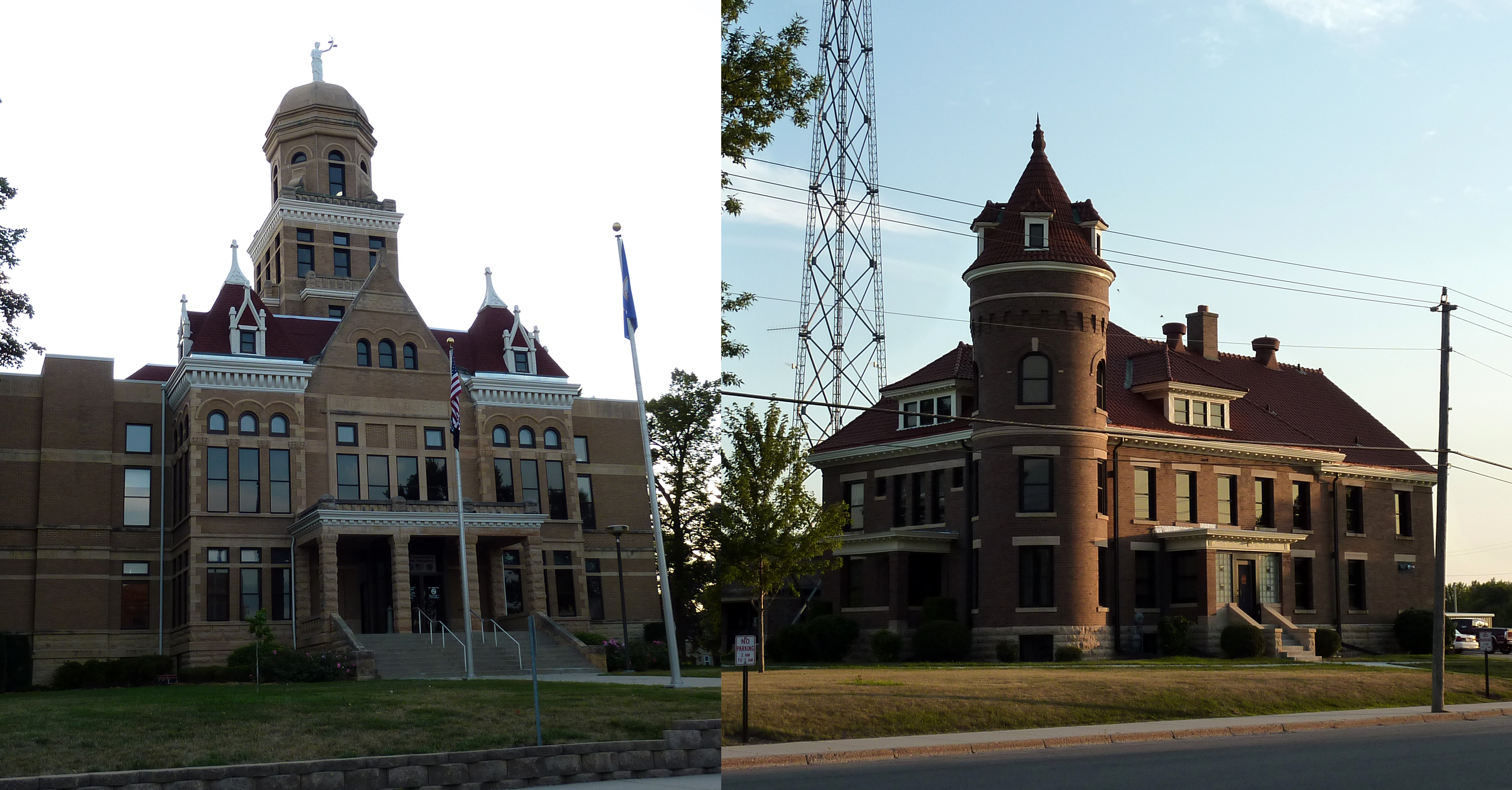
- Le Sueur County Courthouse and Jail

- Location within Minnesota Location within the United States
- Interactive map showing the location of Le Sueur County Courthouse and Jail
- Location: 88 S. Park Ave. and 130 S. Park Ave. Le Center, Minnesota
- Coordinates: 44°23′18″N 93°43′55″W
- Area: 4 acres (1.6 ha)
- Built: 1896
- Architect: Multiple
- Architectural style: Romanesque, Richardsonian Romanesque
- MPS: Le Sueur County MRA
- NRHP reference No.: 81000682
- Added to NRHP: February 17, 1981

The Le Sueur County Courthouse and Jail are government buildings in Le Center, Minnesota, United States. They were added to the National Register of Historic Places in 1981. The 1896 courthouse and 1914 jail were nominated to the Register for being local landmarks representative of Le Sueur County's government and the origin of Le Center as a purpose-built county seat.
