= Derrynane Township, Le Sueur County, Minnesota =

Township in Minnesota, United States

Derrynane Township
- Township
- Location within the state of Minnesota Derrynane Township (the United States)
- Coordinates: 44°30′N 93°43′W
- Country: United States
- State: Minnesota
- County: Le Sueur

Area
  - Total: 36.1 sq mi (93.5 km^{2})
  - Land: 35.8 sq mi (92.7 km^{2})
  - Water: 0.31 sq mi (0.8 km^{2})
- Elevation: 1,007 ft (307 m)

Population (2000)
  - Total: 549
  - Density: 15/sq mi (5.9/km^{2})
- Time zone: UTC-6 (Central (CST))
  - Summer (DST): UTC-5 (CDT)
- FIPS code: 27-15760
- GNIS feature ID: 0663969

Derrynane Township is a township in Le Sueur County, Minnesota, United States. The population was 549 at the 2000 census.

Derrynane Township was organized in 1858, and named after the Derrynane Abbey, in Ireland.

== Geography ==
According to the United States Census Bureau, the township has a total area of 36.1 square miles (93 km^{2}), of which 35.8 square miles (92.7 km^{2}) is land and 0.3 square miles (0.78 km^{2}) (0.86%) is water.

== Demographics ==
As of the census of 2000, there were 549 people, 194 households, and 154 families residing in the township. The population density was 15.3 inhabitants per square mile (5.9/km^{2}). There were 200 housing units at an average density of 5.6 per square mile (2.2/km^{2}). The racial makeup of the township was 99.09% White, 0.18% Native American, 0.36% Asian, and 0.36% from two or more races.

There were 194 households, out of which 36.1% had children under the age of 18 living with them, 67.5% were married couples living together, 6.7% had a female householder with no husband present, and 20.6% were non-families. 19.6% of all households were made up of individuals, and 7.7% had someone living alone who was 65 years of age or older. The average household size was 2.83 and the average family size was 3.26.

In the township the population was spread out, with 29.3% under the age of 18, 6.9% from 18 to 24, 25.1% from 25 to 44, 24.8% from 45 to 64, and 13.8% who were 65 years of age or older. The median age was 38 years. For every 100 females, there were 106.4 males. For every 100 females age 18 and over, there were 105.3 males.

The median income for a household in the township was $53,333, and the median income for a family was $61,071. Males had a median income of $38,500 versus $25,893 for females. The per capita income for the township was $19,485. About 7.2% of families and 7.8% of the population were below the poverty line, including 10.6% of those under age 18 and 7.0% of those age 65 or over.
