= Westerman Lumber Office and House =

Historic building in Montgomery, Minnesota, United States

- U.S. National Register of Historic Places
- Pizzeria 201 in the building in 2021

- Location within Minnesota Location within the United States
- Location: 201 South First Street, Montgomery, Minnesota
- Coordinates: 44°26′16″N 93°34′50″W
- Area: less than one acre
- Built: 1880s
- MPS: Le Sueur County MRA
- NRHP reference No.: 82004702
- Added to NRHP: March 15, 1982

The Westerman Lumber Office and House is a historic building in Montgomery, Minnesota, United States. The private, commercial structure was placed on the National Register of Historic Places (NRHP) on March 15, 1982. The structure is considered an outstanding example of the brick buildings built in the area of Montgomery and New Prague during the late 19th century, using bricks manufactured in the Minnesota River Valley.

== Structure ==
The Westerman Lumber Office and House is located in Montgomery's principle business district on the east side of First Street. An L-shaped building, it has an intersecting gable roof which folds at a 45-degree angle over the front facade. The structure was first constructed as a small, wood-frame office building in the 1880s. In 1895, a back section was added and the entire structure was veneered in a buff colored brick. Brick pilaster strips are located at the corners of the building and between the bays of the front ell. The west (front) facade uses rectilinear windows with green wood trim featuring a stylized floral design in the wood lintels, and double-hung windows are used on the second level. The windows on the north facade use arched brick hoods and decoractive panels composed of exposed brick corners beneath the sills.

== History ==
Henry E. Westerman settled in Le Sueur County in 1873, and moved to Montgomery to start a sawmill when the town was founded in 1877. He established the Westerman Lumber Company in 1889. The building was constructed in the 1880s as a small, wood frame office building. Westerman purchased the structure in 1891 to use as an office. He added to the back of the structure in 1895 so it could house his family, and at the time had the structure veneered in brick. Westerman's company outgrew the building and it was sold in 1915; at that time the original entrance was bricked up. By 1996 it was being used as a private residence.

The building was later restored by former airline pilot John A. Grimm, who also restored Montgomery's other NRHP building, Hilltop Hall.

It currently houses a Pizzeria.
