= Martin M. Malone =

American politician (1888–1962)

Martin M. Malone (August 2, 1888 – January 30, 1962) was an American businessman and politician.

Malone was born in Montgomery, Le Sueur County, Minnesota and went to the Montgomery, Minnesota parochial and public schools. He lived in Montgomery, Minnesota with his wife and family. Malone was a warehouse worker and supervisor for the Green Giant Canning Company. Malone served on the Montgomery City Council and on the Montgomery City Park Board. He was also the Montgomery Fire Department chief. Malone served in the Minnesota Senate from 1955 to 1958.
