= Ottawa Township, Le Sueur County, Minnesota =

Township in Minnesota, United States

Ottawa Township
- Township
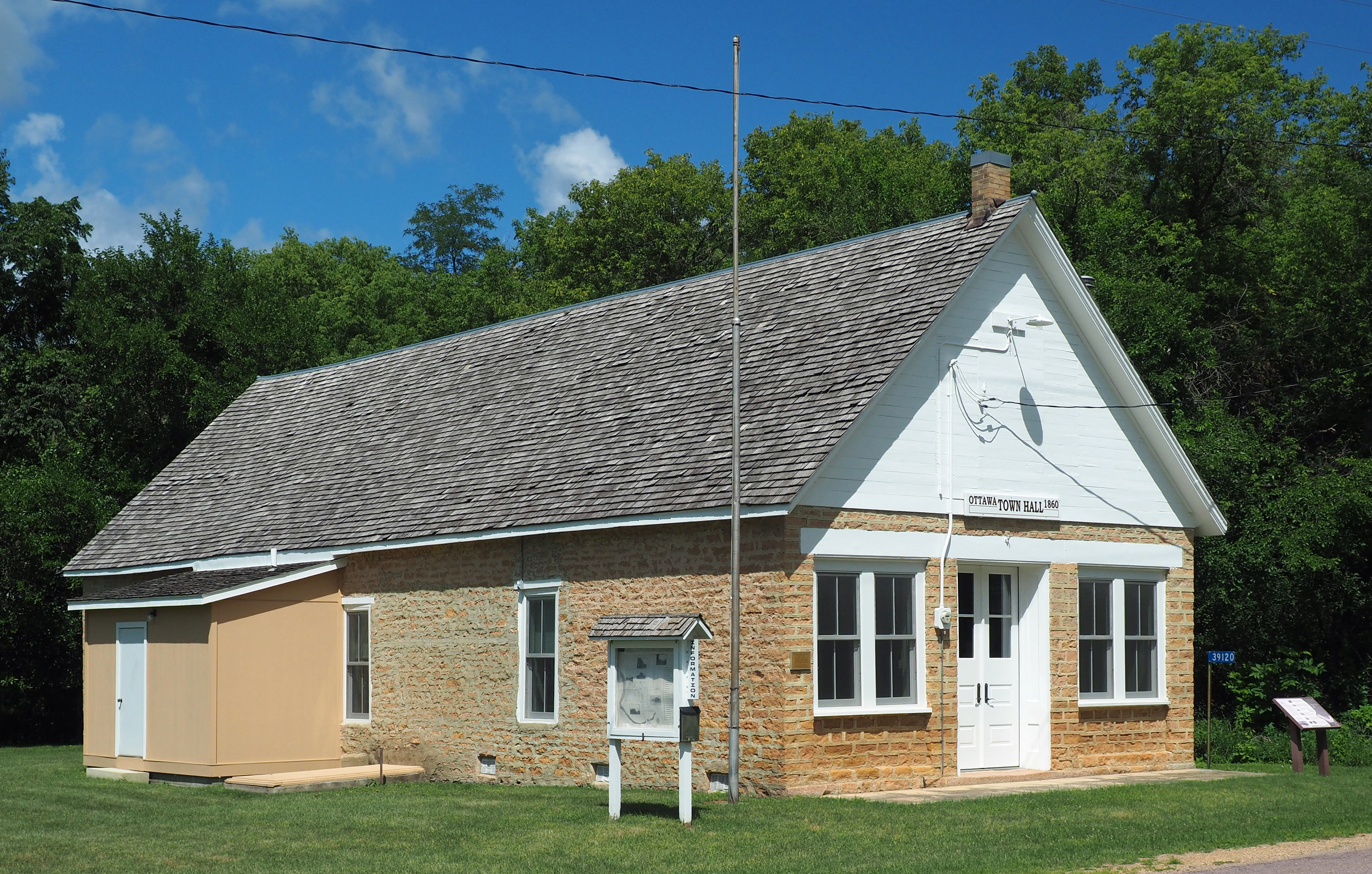
- Town hall

- Location within the state of Minnesota Ottawa Township (the United States)
- Coordinates: 44°24′22″N 93°55′17″W
- Country: United States
- State: Minnesota
- County: Le Sueur

Area
  - Total: 15.3 sq mi (39.7 km^{2})
  - Land: 15.1 sq mi (39.1 km^{2})
  - Water: 0.23 sq mi (0.6 km^{2})
- Elevation: 860 ft (262 m)

Population (2000)
  - Total: 290
  - Density: 19/sq mi (7.4/km^{2})
- Time zone: UTC-6 (Central (CST))
  - Summer (DST): UTC-5 (CDT)
- FIPS code: 27-49174
- GNIS feature ID: 0665238

Ottawa Township is a township in Le Sueur County, Minnesota, United States. The population was 290 at the 2000 census. Ottawa Township was organized in 1858.

The unincorporated community of Ottawa is located within Ottawa Township.

== Geography ==
According to the United States Census Bureau, the township has a total area of 15.3 square miles (39.7 km^{2}), of which 15.1 square miles (39.1 km^{2}) is land and 0.2 square mile (0.6 km^{2}) (1.50%) is water.

== Demographics ==
As of the census of 2000, there were 290 people, 122 households, and 89 families residing in the township. The population density was 19.2 people per square mile (7.4/km^{2}). There were 127 housing units at an average density of 8.4/sq mi (3.2/km^{2}). The racial makeup of the township was 97.59% White, 0.69% Asian, 1.72% from other races. Hispanic or Latino of any race were 1.72% of the population.

There were 122 households, out of which 26.2% had children under the age of 18 living with them, 67.2% were married couples living together, 4.1% had a female householder with no husband present, and 27.0% were non-families. 23.0% of all households were made up of individuals, and 9.0% had someone living alone who was 65 years of age or older. The average household size was 2.38 and the average family size was 2.80.

In the township the population was spread out, with 23.8% under the age of 18, 2.8% from 18 to 24, 30.3% from 25 to 44, 29.0% from 45 to 64, and 14.1% who were 65 years of age or older. The median age was 42 years. For every 100 females, there were 105.7 males. For every 100 females age 18 and over, there were 104.6 males.

The median income for a household in the township was $48,750, and the median income for a family was $56,563. Males had a median income of $31,618 versus $31,875 for females. The per capita income for the township was $22,908. About 2.6% of families and 3.3% of the population were below the poverty line, including none of those under the age of eighteen and 5.1% of those 65 or over.
