= Lexington Township, Le Sueur County, Minnesota =

Township in Minnesota, United States

Lexington Township
- Township
- Location within the state of Minnesota Lexington Township (the United States)
- Coordinates: 44°25′5″N 93°41′59″W
- Country: United States
- State: Minnesota
- County: Le Sueur

Area
  - Total: 34.8 sq mi (90.1 km^{2})
  - Land: 34.1 sq mi (88.3 km^{2})
  - Water: 0.69 sq mi (1.8 km^{2})
- Elevation: 1,024 ft (312 m)

Population (2000)
  - Total: 763
  - Density: 22/sq mi (8.6/km^{2})
- Time zone: UTC-6 (Central (CST))
  - Summer (DST): UTC-5 (CDT)
- FIPS code: 27-36872
- GNIS feature ID: 0664773

Lexington Township is a township in Le Sueur County, Minnesota, United States. The population was 763 at the 2000 census.

Lexington Township was organized in 1858, taking its name from the settlement of Lexington.

== Geography ==
According to the United States Census Bureau, the township has a total area of 34.8 square miles (90.1 km^{2}), of which 34.1 square miles (88.3 km^{2}) is land and 0.7 square mile (1.8 km^{2}) (1.96%) is water.

== Demographics ==
As of the census of 2000, there were 763 people, 286 households, and 209 families residing in the township. The population density was 22.4 inhabitants per square mile (8.6/km^{2}). There were 297 housing units at an average density of 8.7 per square mile (3.4/km^{2}). The racial makeup of the township was 99.21% White, 0.26% Asian, and 0.52% from two or more races. Hispanic or Latino of any race were 0.52% of the population.

There were 286 households, out of which 32.5% had children under the age of 18 living with them, 68.2% were married couples living together, 3.1% had a female householder with no husband present, and 26.6% were non-families. 21.3% of all households were made up of individuals, and 9.4% had someone living alone who was 65 years of age or older. The average household size was 2.67 and the average family size was 3.15.

In the township the population was spread out, with 25.3% under the age of 18, 8.5% from 18 to 24, 27.0% from 25 to 44, 25.2% from 45 to 64, and 14.0% who were 65 years of age or older. The median age was 40 years. For every 100 females, there were 119.3 males. For every 100 females age 18 and over, there were 117.6 males.

The median income for a household in the township was $47,125, and the median income for a family was $56,042. Males had a median income of $32,708 versus $25,833 for females. The per capita income for the township was $18,968. About 5.6% of families and 8.6% of the population were below the poverty line, including 11.5% of those under age 18 and 11.2% of those age 65 or over.
