= Dr. William W. Mayo House =

Historic house in Minnesota, United States

- U.S. National Register of Historic Places
- Minnesota State Register of Historic Places
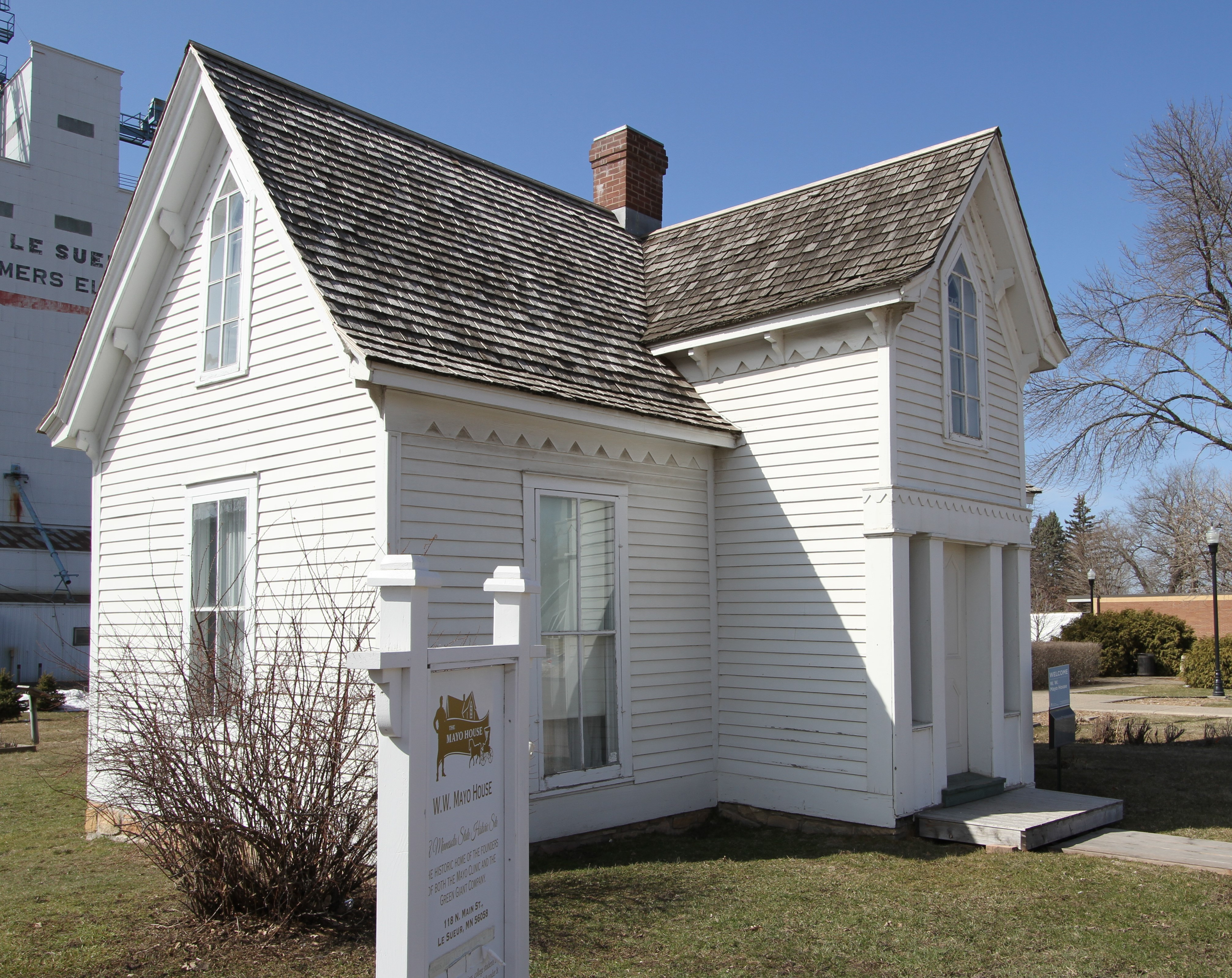
- The home in 2018

- Location within Minnesota Location within the United States
- Location: Le Sueur, Minnesota
- Coordinates: 44°27′43.9″N 93°54′53.11″W
- Built: 1859
- Architect: Dr. William W. Mayo, James Mayo
- Architectural style: Carpenter Gothic
- NRHP reference No.: 69000074
- Added to NRHP: November 25, 1969

The Dr. William W. Mayo House, located at 118 North Main Street in Le Sueur, Minnesota, United States, is listed on the National Register of Historic Places (NRHP). It was built in 1859 by James Mayo and his brother, William Worrall Mayo who emigrated from Salford, United Kingdom, to the United States in 1846 and became a doctor. William's older son, William James Mayo was born in the home in 1861. William W. Mayo aided pioneers and their families during the Dakota War of 1862 and later moved to Rochester where he became the examining surgeon for the southern Minnesota Civil War draft board. He and his sons, William and Charles founded the 27-bed Saint Marys Hospital which opened in 1889 following the 1883 Rochester tornado. They later founded their namesake, the Mayo Clinic.

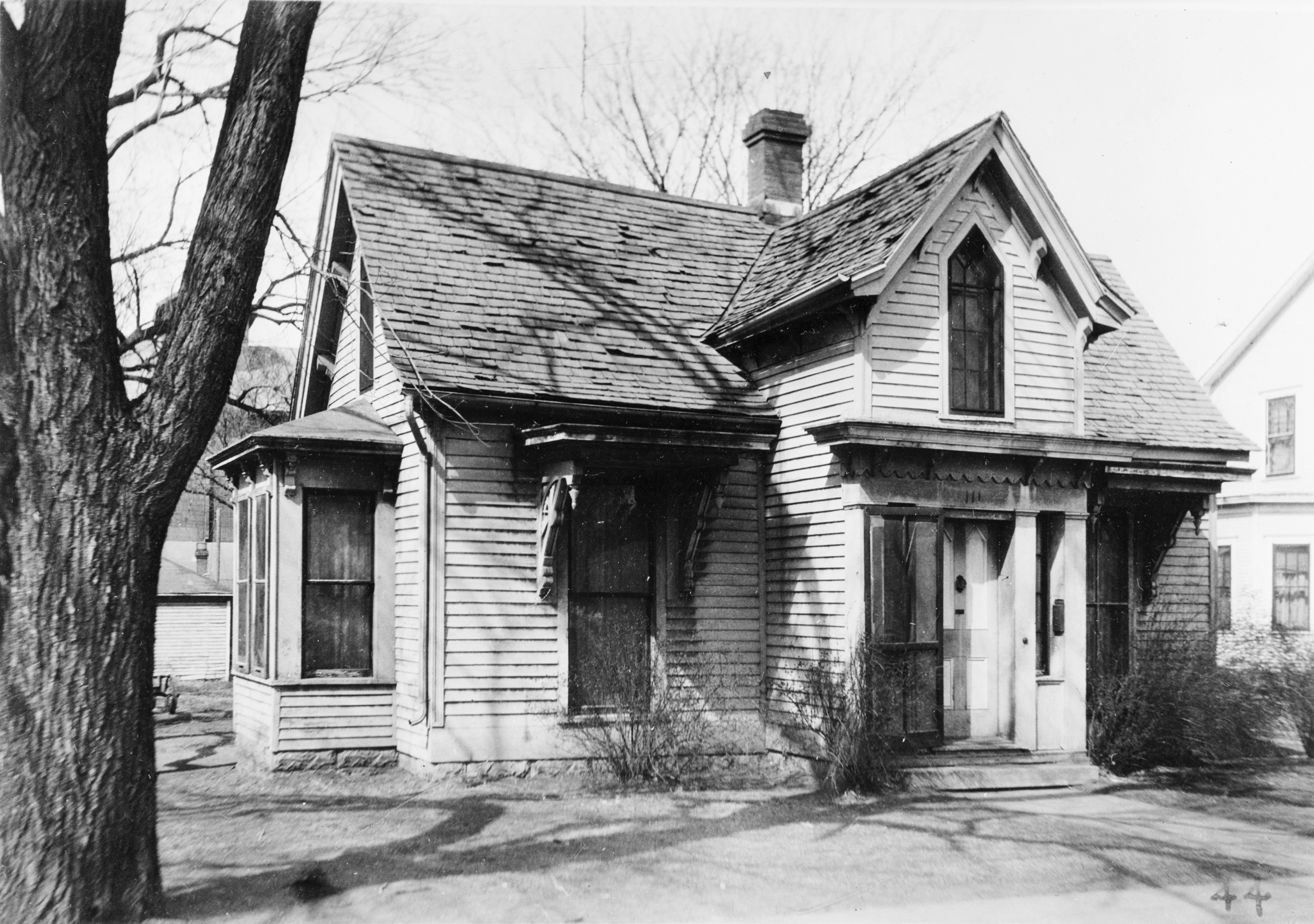
The home in 1934.

The next owner of the home was Charlotte Wright Bradley (mother of Elizabeth, who married Carson Nesbit Cosgrove (1853-1936)). Bradley gave the home to the newlyweds in 1874. In 1903 Cosgrove presided at the organizational meeting of the Minnesota Valley Canning Company (later renamed Green Giant), becoming a pioneer of canning in the Minnesota River valley. Cosgrove's son, Edward, and grandson, Robert, each born in the home, also served as heads of the company over the ensuing decades before the company was swallowed by General Mills.

The Mayo House, also known as the W. W. Mayo House, is a state historic site managed by the Ney Nature Center in partnership with the Minnesota Historical Society. The house has been restored and furnished to appear as in 1860. The Mayoview History Center, located in a separate building, features exhibits about the Mayo family, St. Mary's Hospital and the Mayo Clinic.

== See also ==
- Dr. William J. Mayo House, Rochester, Minnesota, also NRHP-listed
