= Le Sueur, Minnesota =

City in Minnesota, United States

- City
- Businesses at S Main Street and Ferry Street

- Location of Le Sueur within Le Sueur and Sibley Counties in the state of Minnesota
- Coordinates: 44°28′13″N 93°54′09″W
- Country: United States
- State: Minnesota
- Counties: Le Sueur

Government
  - Type: Mayor – Council
  - Mayor: Shawn Kirby

Area
  - Total: 5.44 sq mi (14.09 km^{2})
  - Land: 5.20 sq mi (13.46 km^{2})
  - Water: 0.24 sq mi (0.63 km^{2})
- Elevation: 827 ft (252 m)

Population (2020)
  - Total: 4,213
  - Estimate (2021): 4,178
  - Density: 810.4/sq mi (312.91/km^{2})
- Time zone: UTC-6 (CST)
  - Summer (DST): UTC-5 (CDT)
- ZIP code: 56058
- Area code: 507
- FIPS code: 27-36746
- GNIS feature ID: 2395659
- Website: cityoflesueur.com

Le Sueur (/ləˈsʊər/ lə-SOOR) is a city in Le Sueur County in the U.S. state of Minnesota, between Mankato and the Twin Cities. It lies along the Minnesota River and U.S. Highway 169. Le Sueur was named in honor of French explorer Pierre-Charles Le Sueur. Its population was 4,213 at the 2020 census.

The community is known locally as the "Valley of the Jolly Green Giant". A large billboard, with the caption "Welcome to the Valley" and Green Giant logo, remains even after the company and Green Giant label were bought by Pillsbury in 1979. Pillsbury merged with General Mills in 2001. In 2016, General Mills spun off Green Giant to B&G Foods and the canning is done in Montgomery, Minnesota. The old canning processing plant in Le Sueur was used until 1995. It is still used for agriculture-related research for corn varieties. Peas are no longer researched at the Le Sueur plant. The sugar snap pea variety was developed by a scientist at the Le Sueur plant.

== History ==
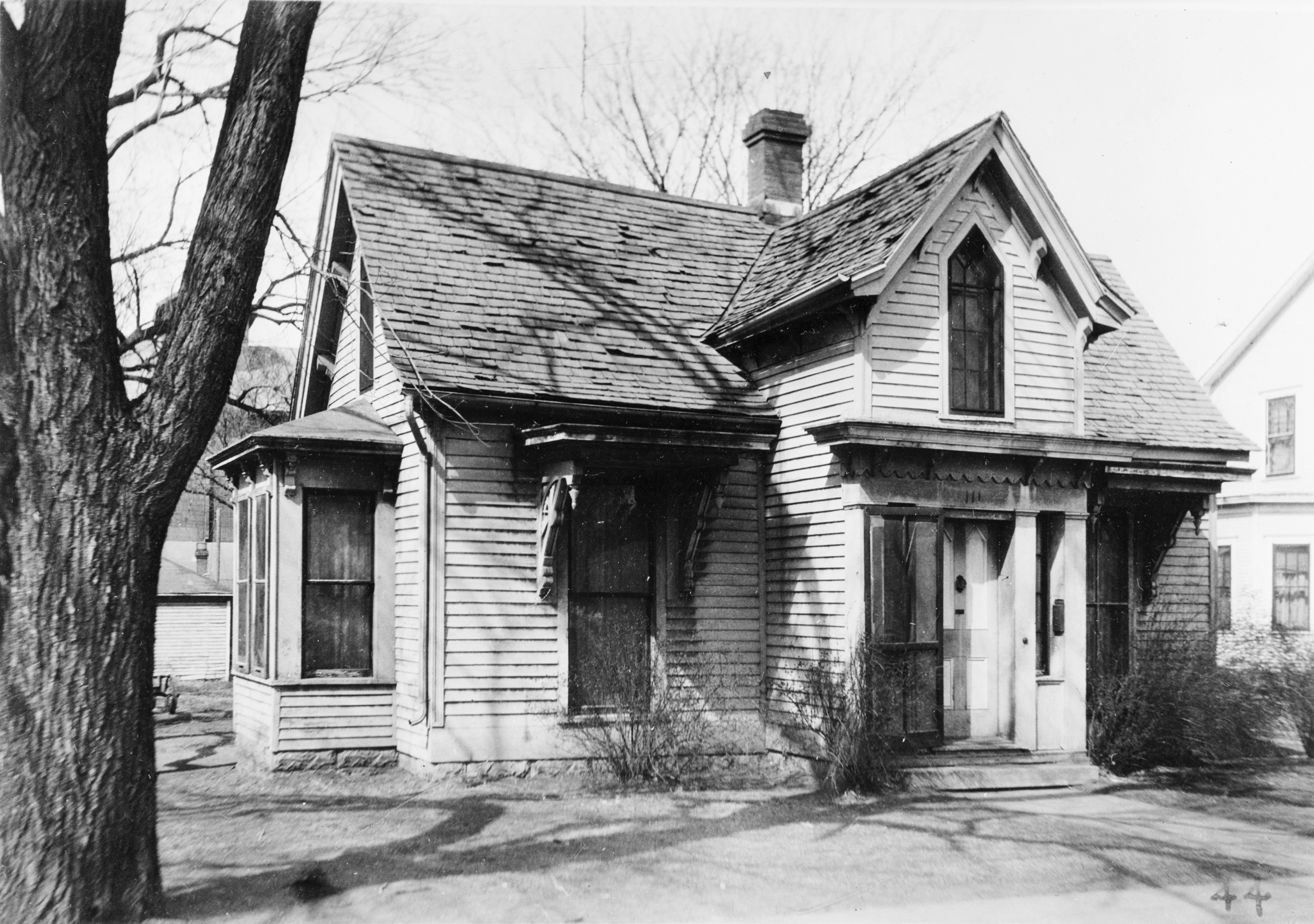
Dr. William W. Mayo House circa 1934

Le Sueur was named its current name in 1853 by the community there at the time after explorer Pierre-Charles Le Sueur, who explored this area from 1683 to 1722. Before this, the area was known by the French as Prairie la Fleche, or "arrow prairie". This place name is believed to originate from a translation of the native Dakota name for the area, Wahinoge, or "flint quary", a material used to make arrowheads.

In 1852, the first claim on the area that is now the city of Le Sueur was made by George W. Thompson. Soon after Thompson settled here, Henry McLean, presenting a license from the governor for him to operate with natives of the area, demanded Thompson's vacation. Despite his vacation, Thompson was able to claim lands one mile upriver. Within that year, Thompson, accompanied by a party led by J.M. Farmer, founded the village of Le Sueur. McLean, accompanied by John Christy and John Catheart, and unaware of the village upriver, attempted to found his own village of Le Sueur. As an identically named settlement, though, had already been legally platted upriver, McLean was required to settle for the name Le Sueur City. Rivalry over the righteous claim of Le Sueur caused both cities to legislate civil matters separately and deterred the incorporation of either community. In 1867, a special act by Minnesota Legislature was able to remedy this by uniting both communities into one borough town, Le Sueur.

William Worrall Mayo was an early resident who began his medical practice in Le Sueur. He eventually founded the world-famous Mayo Clinic in Rochester, Minnesota, with his sons William and Charles. His old home, the Dr. William W. Mayo House, was restored to its mid-1800 appearance and turned into a museum; it, along with several other buildings in Le Sueur, is listed on the National Register of Historic Places.

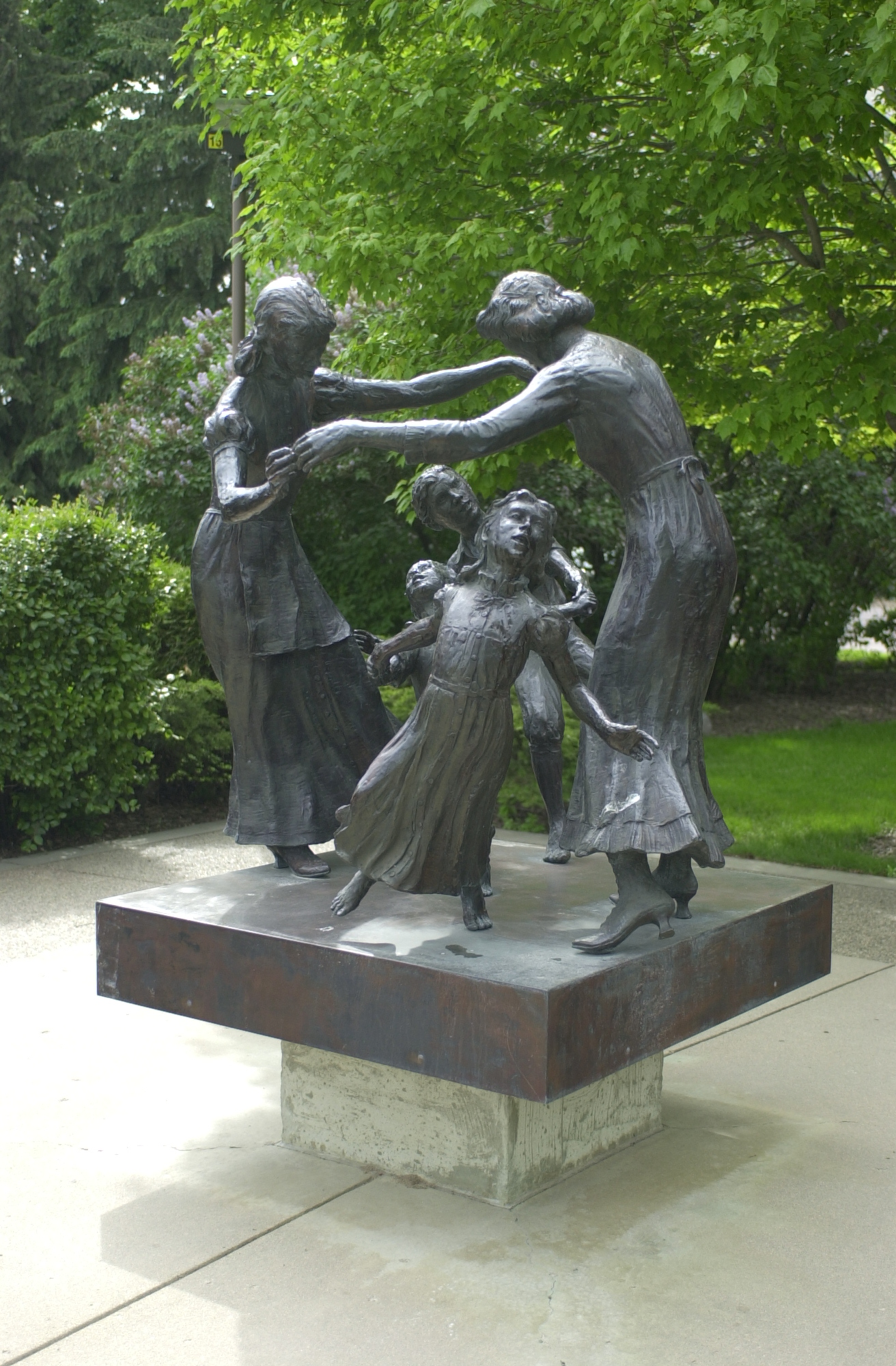
Two mothers, Louise Mayo and Louise Cosgrove, commemorate the Mayos, of Mayo Clinic fame, and the Cosgroves of Green Giant fame, in this Louise Park statue in Le Sueur, Minnesota.

The company that is now known as Green Giant was founded in 1903 as the Minnesota Valley Canning Company, by 14 Le Sueur local merchants. In 1925, along with the introduction of "Green Giant Great Big Tender Peas", a company mascot based on Paul Bunyan was introduced called the "Jolly Green Giant". The new mascot spurred the company to change its name to Green Giant Co. in 1950. The canning company flourished in Le Sueur until Pillsbury's purchase of Green Giant in 1979, which moved Green Giant headquarters from Le Sueur to Minneapolis. In January 1995, Pillsbury officially announced the closure of the entirety of the original Green Giant processing plant, with the exception of a Green Giant research center.

== Geography ==
According to the United States Census Bureau, the city has a total area of 5.62 square miles (14.56 km^{2}), of which 0.25 sq mi (0.65 km^{2}) is covered by water. A small part of the city extends into Sibley County.

U.S. Highway 169, Minnesota State Highway 93, and County Highway 22 (formerly MSH 112) are three of the main routes in the community.

== Demographics ==
Historical population
Census	Pop.	Note	%±
1880	1,414		—
1890	1,763		24.7%
1900	1,937		9.9%
1910	1,755		−9.4%
1920	1,795		2.3%
1930	1,897		5.7%
1940	2,302		21.3%
1950	2,713		17.9%
1960	3,310		22.0%
1970	3,745		13.1%
1980	3,763		0.5%
1990	3,714		−1.3%
2000	3,922		5.6%
2010	4,058		3.5%
2020	4,213		3.8%
2021 (est.)	4,178		−0.8%
U.S. Decennial Census; 2020 Census

=== 2020 census ===
As of the 2020 census, Le Sueur had a population of 4,213. The median age was 39.3 years. 24.8% of residents were under the age of 18 and 18.7% of residents were 65 years of age or older. For every 100 females there were 95.5 males, and for every 100 females age 18 and over there were 94.5 males age 18 and over.

0.0% of residents lived in urban areas, while 100.0% lived in rural areas.

There were 1,699 households in Le Sueur, of which 31.3% had children under the age of 18 living in them. Of all households, 43.6% were married-couple households, 19.5% were households with a male householder and no spouse or partner present, and 27.4% were households with a female householder and no spouse or partner present. About 31.4% of all households were made up of individuals and 11.7% had someone living alone who was 65 years of age or older.

There were 1,827 housing units, of which 7.0% were vacant. The homeowner vacancy rate was 1.3% and the rental vacancy rate was 8.7%.

Racial composition as of the 2020 census
Race	Number	Percent
White	3,536	83.9%
Black or African American	104	2.5%
American Indian and Alaska Native	17	0.4%
Asian	19	0.5%
Native Hawaiian and Other Pacific Islander	6	0.1%
Some other race	188	4.5%
Two or more races	343	8.1%
Hispanic or Latino (of any race)	548	13.0%

=== 2010 census ===
As of the census of 2010, 4,058 people, 1,640 households, and 1,058 families were residing in the city. The population density was 755.7 inhabitants per square mile (291.8/km^{2}). The 1,782 housing units had an average density of 331.8 per square mile (128.1/km^{2}). The racial makeup of the city was 90.6% White, 0.8% African American, 0.3% Native American, 0.8% Asian, 5.9% from other races, and 1.5% from two or more races. Hispanics or Latinos of any race were 11.9% of the population.

Of the 1,640 households, 32.7% had children under 18 living with them, 48.5% were married couples living together, 11.6% had a female householder with no husband present, 4.5% had a male householder with no wife present, and 35.5% were not families. About 29.3% of all households were made up of individuals, and 12.4% had someone living alone who was 65 or older. The average household size was 2.41 and the average family size was 2.97.

The median age in the city was 37.9 years; the age distribution was 25.0% of under 18; 8.2% from 18 to 24; 25.8% from 25 to 44; 24.2% from 45 to 64; and 16.6% were 65 or older. The gender makeup of the city was 48.4% male and 51.6% female.

=== 2000 census ===
As of the 2000 census, 3,922 people, 1,545 households, and 1,025 families were living in the city. The population density was 879.0 inhabitants per square mile (339.4/km^{2}). The 1,589 housing units had an average density of 356.1 per square mile (137.5/km^{2}). The racial makeup of the city was 92.48% White, 0.25% African American, 0.15% Native American, 0.28% Asian, 0.08% Pacific Islander, 5.86% from other races, and 0.89% from two or more races. Hispanics or Latinos of any race were 9.64% of the population.

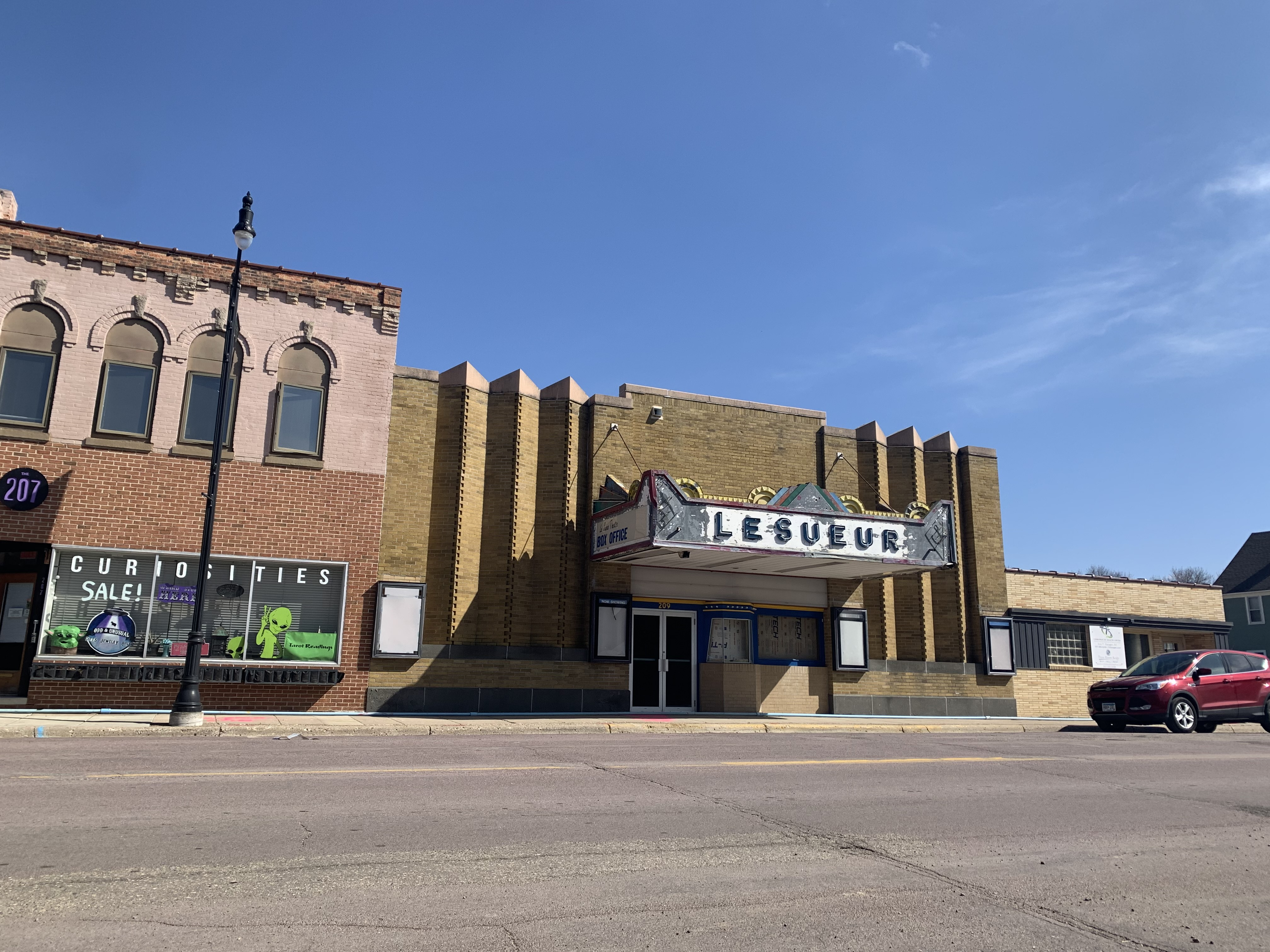
Le Sueur Theater

Of the 1,545 households, 33.3% had children under 18 living with them, 53.3% were married couples living together, 9.4% had a female householder with no husband present, and 33.6% were not families. About 29.3% of all households were made up of individuals, and 14.6% had someone living alone who was 65 or older. The average household size was 2.48 and the average family size was 3.07.

In the city, the age distribution was 27.8% under 18, 7.8% from 18 to 24, 26.7% from 25 to 44, 20.5% from 45 to 64, and 17.2% who were 65 or older. The median age was 37 years. For every 100 females, there were 93.5 males. For every 100 females 18 and over, there were 88.2 males.

The median income for a household in the city was $42,372, and for a family was $53,362. Males had a median income of $35,810 versus $24,359 for females. The per capita income for the city was $21,605. About 5.8% of families and 8.8% of the population were below the poverty line, including 12.3% of those under 18 and 10.7% of those 65 or over.

== Economy ==
Despite the devastation of Green Giant's departure, unemployment is low due to expansions to the pre-existing Le Sueur Inc. foundry and Davisco creamery, and Cambria, a manufacturer of natural quartz surfaces. A Mars pet food plant existed in Le Sueur shortly until it was closed in 2009.

== Education ==
The school system of Le Sueur, Le Sueur-Henderson School District, serves the roughly 1,076 students of Le Sueur and the nearby city of Henderson jointly. This system consists of Park Elementary School and Le Sueur-Henderson Secondary School in Le Sueur and Hilltop Elementary School in Henderson. Each school in the system serves its own division of the system from kindergarten to 12th grade. Park Elementary School serves kindergarten-third grade; Hilltop serves fourth and fifth grades; Le Sueur-Henderson Secondary School serves sixth-12th grade.

Beyond the public school system, St. Anne's Catholic School, a private Roman Catholic elementary school, serves students from prekindergarten to fifth grade. Despite being a Catholic institution, St. Anne's admits students from all Christian denominations.

== Places of worship ==
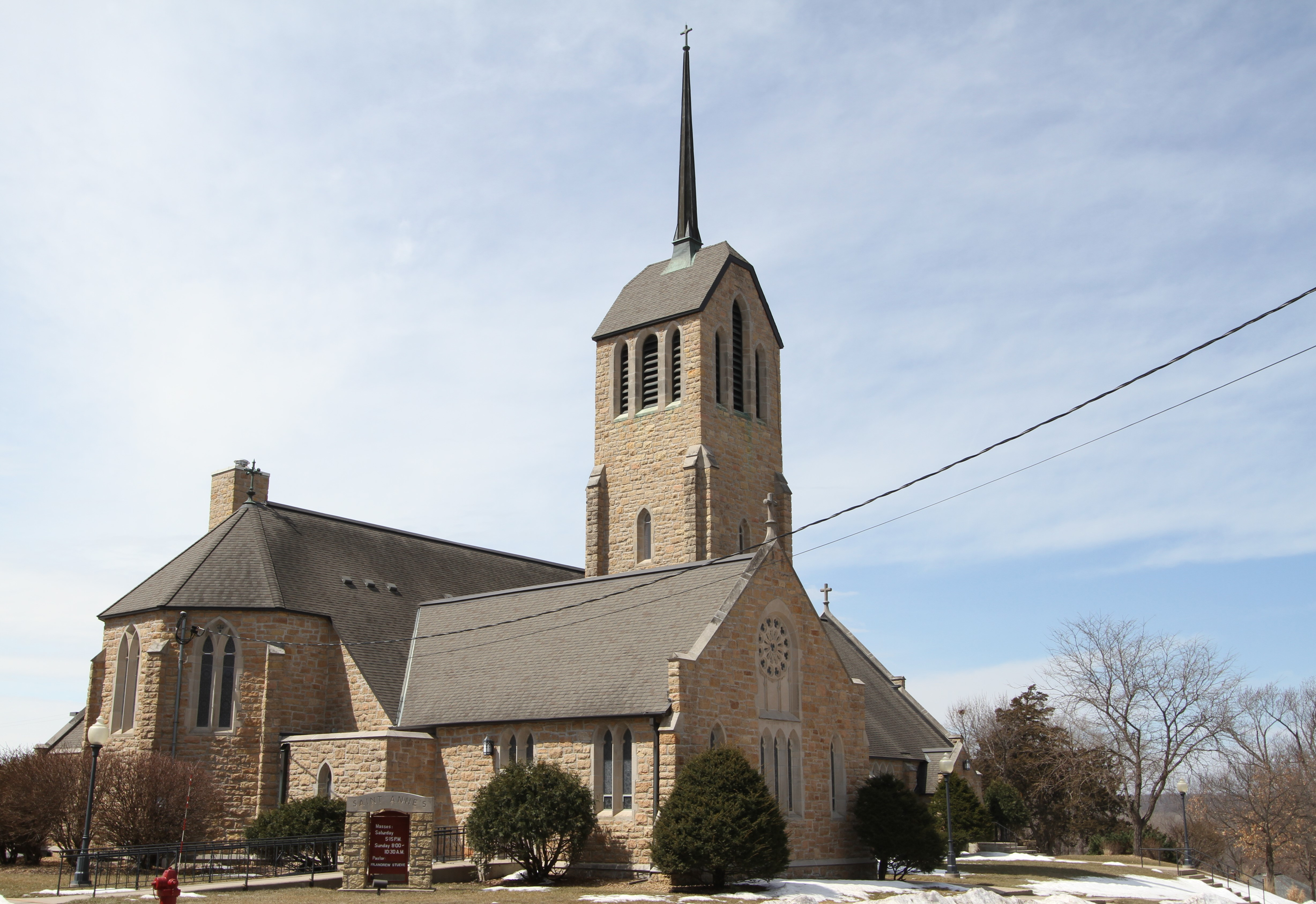
Saint Anne's in Le Sueur

The city of Le Sueur holds six churches total with a Catholic church, a Methodist church, a Mainline Protestant church, and three Lutheran churches.

On July 26, 1862, Saint Anne's Roman Catholic parish was established by the Archdiocese of Saint Paul and Minneapolis with Father Venn as its first pastor; within a year, a church was built. The church was affiliated, as of its original founding, with Le Sueur's French populace.

Zion United Church of Christ is the oldest continuously operating church in Le Sueur. It was formed from the two churches present in the Le Sueur area in 1868, a German native Lutheran church and a New Knoxville, Ohio, native Reform church. The church moved to three different parts of Le Sueur until being plotted in its current location in 1956. Until a 1931 vote changed it to English, church services were held in German.

A few years after the Zion church's merger, a wave of Swedish immigration spurred the formation of the First Lutheran Church, in 1883. The church moved to three different parts of Le Sueur until being plotted in its current location in 1980. Church services were held in Swedish until 1927 when they were changed to English.

In 1955, the Grace Lutheran Church was founded as a member of the Wisconsin Evangelical Lutheran Synod.

In 1978, the Word of Life Lutheran Brethren Church was formed by a group of Le Sueur Lutheran families. The church existed only among church members' houses until a church building was purchased, the First Lutheran Church's previous building, in 1980. The church was plotted in its current location in 1996.

Le Sueur is also home to the Le Sueur United Methodist Church.
