= Le Center, Minnesota =

City in Minnesota, United States

- City
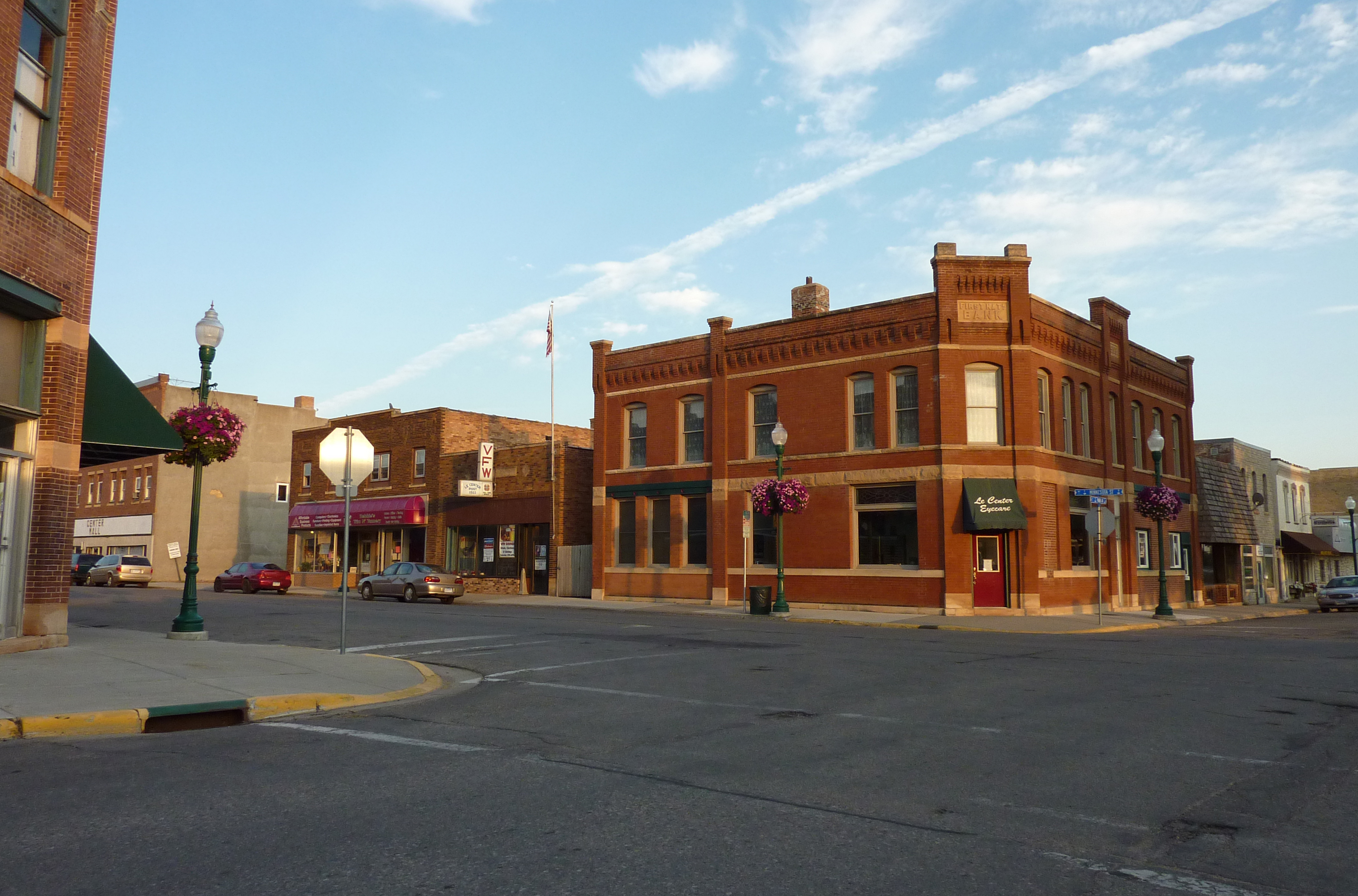
- Downtown Le Center
- Nickname: Tree City USA
- Motto: "The Heart Of LeSueur County"
- Location of Le Center within Le Sueur County and state of Minnesota
- Coordinates: 44°23′12″N 93°43′52″W
- Country: United States
- State: Minnesota
- County: Le Sueur

Government
  - Type: Mayor – Council
  - Mayor: Josh Fredrickson

Area
  - Total: 1.68 sq mi (4.34 km^{2})
  - Land: 1.68 sq mi (4.34 km^{2})
  - Water: 0 sq mi (0.00 km^{2})
- Elevation: 1,050 ft (320 m)

Population (2020)
  - Total: 2,517
  - Density: 1,501/sq mi (579.7/km^{2})
- Time zone: UTC-6 (Central (CST))
  - Summer (DST): UTC-5 (CDT)
- ZIP code: 56057
- Area code: 507
- FIPS code: 27-36134
- GNIS feature ID: 2395652
- Website: cityoflecenter.com

Le Center is a city and the county seat of Le Sueur County, Minnesota, United States. The population was 2,517 at the 2020 census. The Le Sueur County Courthouse and Jail are listed on the National Register of Historic Places.

== Geography ==
According to the United States Census Bureau, the city currently has a total area of 1.51 square miles (3.91 km^{2}), all land.

Le Center is located 26 miles (42 km) from Mankato and 62 miles (100 km) from Minneapolis.

Minnesota State Highways 99 and 112 are two of the main routes in the community.

== Demographics ==
Historical population
Census	Pop.	Note	%±
1880	73		—
1890	169		131.5%
1900	478		182.8%
1910	741		55.0%
1920	863		16.5%
1930	948		9.8%
1940	1,232		30.0%
1950	1,314		6.7%
1960	1,597		21.5%
1970	1,890		18.3%
1980	1,967		4.1%
1990	2,006		2.0%
2000	2,240		11.7%
2010	2,499		11.6%
2020	2,517		0.7%
U.S. Decennial Census; 2020

=== Income and poverty ===
As of 2024 estimates, the median income for a household in the city was $80,673, and the median income for a family was $100,658. However, the per capita income for the city was $35,244. About 17.9% of the population were below the poverty line.

=== 2020 census ===
As of the 2020 census, Le Center had a population of 2,517. The median age was 37.5 years. 26.3% of residents were under the age of 18 and 15.3% of residents were 65 years of age or older. For every 100 females there were 105.5 males, and for every 100 females age 18 and over there were 100.0 males age 18 and over.

0.0% of residents lived in urban areas, while 100.0% lived in rural areas.

There were 952 households in Le Center, of which 35.5% had children under the age of 18 living in them. Of all households, 50.2% were married-couple households, 18.7% were households with a male householder and no spouse or partner present, and 23.7% were households with a female householder and no spouse or partner present. About 29.0% of all households were made up of individuals and 14.8% had someone living alone who was 65 years of age or older.

There were 999 housing units, of which 4.7% were vacant. The homeowner vacancy rate was 1.0% and the rental vacancy rate was 7.2%.

Racial composition as of the 2020 census
Race	Number	Percent
White	1,859	73.9%
Black or African American	27	1.1%
American Indian and Alaska Native	27	1.1%
Asian	17	0.7%
Native Hawaiian and Other Pacific Islander	1	0.0%
Some other race	318	12.6%
Two or more races	268	10.6%
Hispanic or Latino (of any race)	649	25.8%

=== 2010 census ===
As of the census of 2010, there were 2,499 people, 915 households, and 629 families residing in the city. The population density was 1,655.0 inhabitants per square mile (639.0/km^{2}). There were 971 housing units at an average density of 643.0 per square mile (248.3/km^{2}). The racial makeup of the city was 89.2% White, 0.2% African American, 0.2% Native American, 1.4% Asian, 8.4% from other races, and 0.5% from two or more races. Hispanic or Latino of any race were 21.0% of the population.

There were 915 households, of which 37.9% had children under the age of 18 living with them, 52.5% were married couples living together, 9.4% had a female householder with no husband present, 6.9% had a male householder with no wife present, and 31.3% were non-families. 27.1% of all households were made up of individuals, and 11.4% had someone living alone who was 65 years of age or older. The average household size was 2.67 and the average family size was 3.25.

The median age in the city was 32.8 years. 28.5% of residents were under the age of 18; 8.4% were between the ages of 18 and 24; 28.2% were from 25 to 44; 22.2% were from 45 to 64; and 12.6% were 65 years of age or older. The gender makeup of the city was 50.9% male and 49.1% female.

== Climate ==
Le Center has a humid continental climate (Köppen Dfa). Summers are warm and humid, while winters are cold and snowy.

Climate data for Le Center, Minnesota
Month	Jan	Feb	Mar	Apr	May	Jun	Jul	Aug	Sep	Oct	Nov	Dec	Year
Record high °F (°C)	60 (16)	64 (18)	84 (29)	94 (34)	99 (37)	104 (40)	105 (41)	102 (39)	98 (37)	92 (33)	81 (27)	69 (21)	105 (41)
Mean daily maximum °F (°C)	23 (−5)	29 (−2)	41 (5)	58 (14)	71 (22)	80 (27)	84 (29)	81 (27)	73 (23)	61 (16)	41 (5)	27 (−3)	56 (13)
Mean daily minimum °F (°C)	2 (−17)	8 (−13)	21 (−6)	33 (1)	47 (8)	57 (14)	61 (16)	59 (15)	48 (9)	36 (2)	23 (−5)	9 (−13)	34 (1)
Record low °F (°C)	−38 (−39)	−34 (−37)	−29 (−34)	4 (−16)	21 (−6)	37 (3)	40 (4)	36 (2)	25 (−4)	9 (−13)	−15 (−26)	−32 (−36)	−38 (−39)
Average snowfall inches (cm)	7.5 (19)	6.2 (16)	7.9 (20)	1.6 (4.1)	0.2 (0.51)	0 (0)	0 (0)	0 (0)	0 (0)	0.1 (0.25)	4.5 (11)	7.4 (19)	35.4 (89.86)
Source: The Weather Channel
