= List of historical societies in Minnesota =

The following is a list of historical societies in the state of Minnesota, United States.

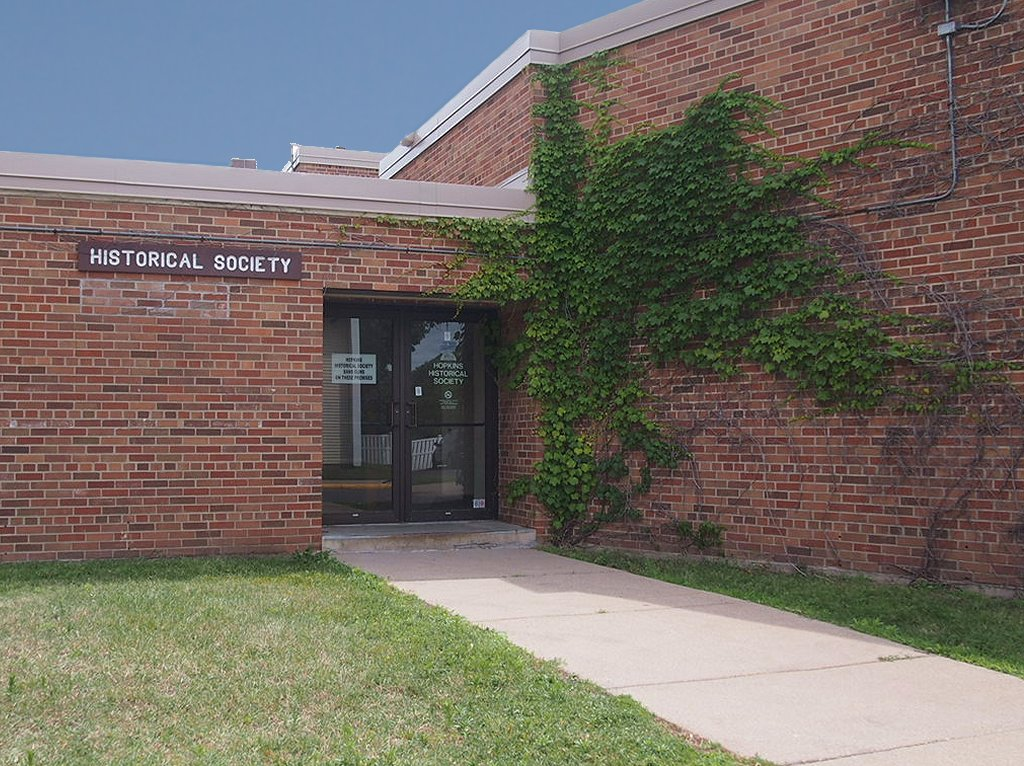
Hopkins Historical Society building in Minnesota (photo 2014)

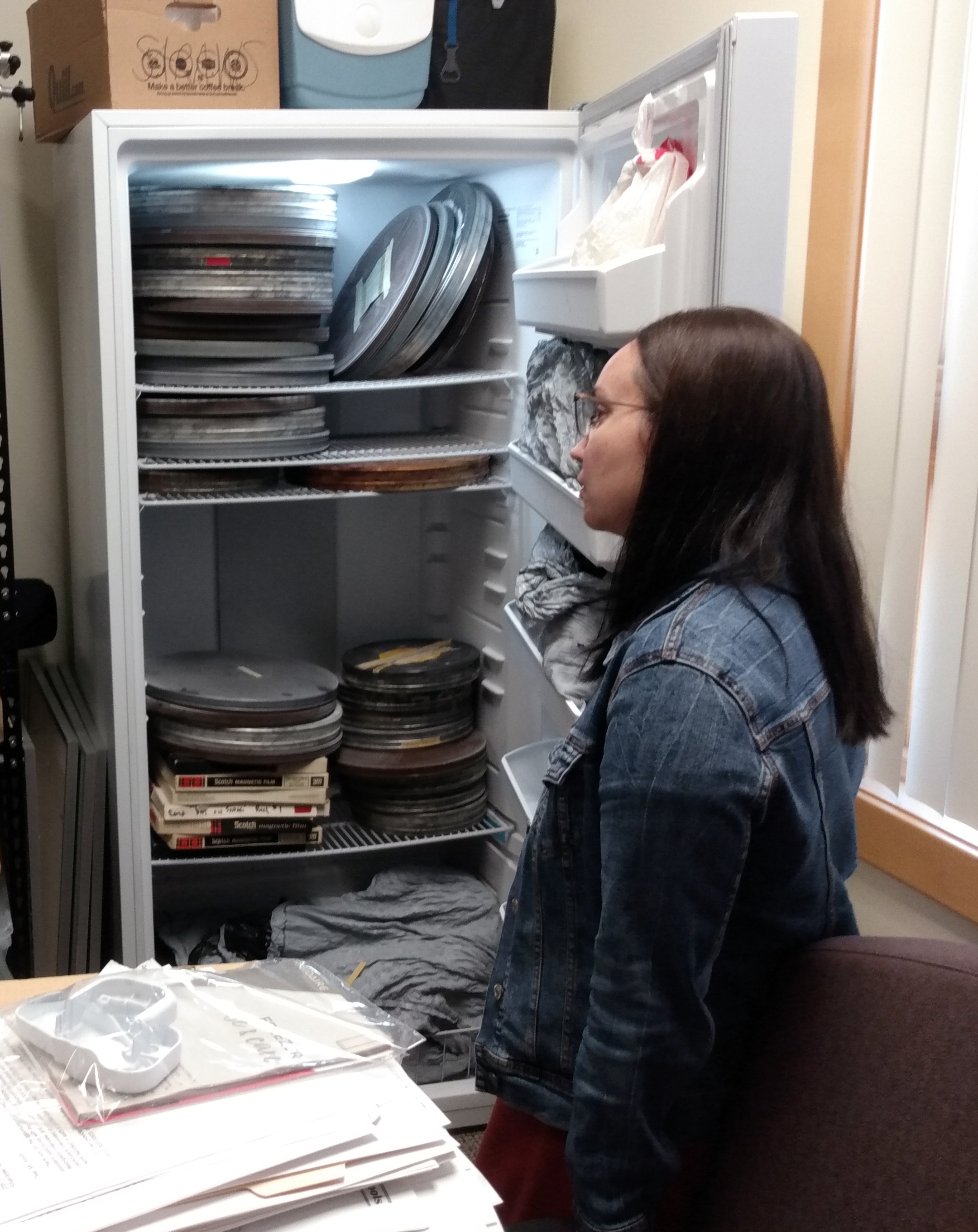
Film in cold storage in the collections of the Scott County Historical Society, Minnesota, 2024

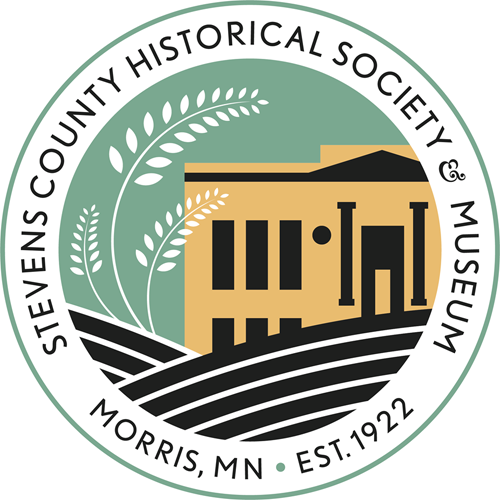
Logo of the Stevens County Historical Society in Minnesota, 2020

== Organizations ==
Aitkin County

- Aitkin County Historical Society
- Mcgregor Area Historical Society

Anoka County

- Anoka County Historical Society
- Blaine Historical Society
- Columbia Heights Historical Society
- Coon Rapids Historical Society

Becker County

- Becker County Historical Society
- Lake Park Area Historical Society

Beltrami County

- Beltrami County Historical Society
- Blackduck Area History And Arts Center
- North Beltrami Heritage Center

Benton County

- Benton County Historical Society
- Sartell Historical Society

Big Stone County, Minnesota

- Big Stone County Historical Society

Blue Earth County

- Blue Earth County Historical Society
- Betsy-Tacy Society
- Madison Lake Area Historical Society
- Rapidan Heritage Society

Brown County

- Brown County Historical Society
- Comfrey Area Historical Society
- Sleepy Eye Area Historical Society
- Springfield Area Historical Society

Carlton County

- Carlton County Historical Society
- Esko Historical Society
- Moose Lake Area Historical Society

Carver County

- Carver County Historical Society
- Chanhassen Historical Society
- Chaska Historical Society
- Waconia Heritage Association
- Watertown Area Historical Society
- Willkommen Heritage Center Of Norwood Young America

Cass County

- Cass County Historical Society

Chippewa County

- Chippewa County Historical Society
- Maynard History Museum
- Friesen Historical Society

Chisago County

- Chisago County Historical Society
- Amador Heritage Center
- Center City Historical Society
- Lindstrom Historical Society
- North Chisago Historical Society
- Taylors Falls Historical Society

Clay County

- Historical and Cultural Society of Clay County
- Ulen Historical Society

Clearwater County

- Clearwater County Historical Society
- Lake Itasca Region Pioneer Farmers

Cook County

- Cook County Historical Society
- Gunflint Trail Historical Society
- Tofte Historical Society, Minnesota
- Schroeder Area Historical Society

Cottonwood County

- Cottonwood County Historical Society

Crow Wing County

- Crow Wing County Historical Society
- Crosslake Area Historical Society
- Cuyuna Iron Range Heritage Network
- Nisswa Area Historical Society
- Pequot Lakes Area Historical Society

Dakota County

- Dakota County Historical Society
- Eagan Historical Society
- Farmington Area Historical Society
- Lakeville Area Historical Society
- Rosemount Area Historical Society

Dodge County

- Dodge County Historical Society
- West Concord Historical Society

Douglas County

- Douglas County Historical Society, Minnesota
- Evansville Historical Foundation
- Kensington Area Heritage Society
- Osakis Area Heritage Center

Faribault County

- Faribault County Historical Society
- Bricelyn Area Historical Society
- Elmore Area Historical Society
- Kiester Area Historical Society
- Minnesota Lake Area Historical Society
- Wells Historical Society
- Winnebago Area Museum

Fillmore County

- Fillmore County Historical Society
- Chatfield Historical Society
- Harmony Area Historical Society
- Hesper-Mabel Area Historical Society
- Preston Historical Society
- Rushford Area Historical Society
- Spring Valley Community Historical Society
- Wykoff Area Historical Society

Freeborn County

- Freeborn County Historical Society
- Community Historical Society-Alden Museum
- Clarks Grove Area Heritage Society
- Hollandale Area Historical Society

Goodhue County

- Goodhue County History Society
- Cannon Falls Area Historical Society
- Goodhue Area Historical Society
- Kenyon Area Historical Society
- Pine Island Area Historical Society
- Wanamingo Historical Society
- Zumbrota Area Historical Society

Grant County

- Grant County Historical Society

Hennepin County, Minnesota

- Hennepin History Museum
- Bloomington Historical Society
- Brooklyn Historical Society, Minnesota|Brooklyn Historical Society
- Champlin Historical Society
- Eden Prairie Historical Society
- Edina Historical Society
- Excelsior-Lake Minnetonka Historical Society
- Golden Valley Historical Society
- Hopkins Historical Society
- City of Minnetonka Historical Society
- North Hennepin Historical Society
- Plymouth Historical Society, Minnesota
- Richfield Historical Society
- Robbinsdale Historical Society
- St. Bonifacius Historical Society
- St. Louis Park Historical Society
- Wayzata Historical Society
- Western Hennepin County Pioneers Association
- [[]]

Houston County

- Houston County Historical Society
- La Crescent Area Historical Society

Hubbard County

- Hubbard County Historical Society
- Paul Bunyan Historical Society And Museum

Isanti County

- Isanti County Historical Society

Itasca County

- Itasca County Historical Society

Jackson County

- Jackson County Historical Society

Kanabec County

- Kanabec History Center

Kandiyohi County

- Kandiyohi County Historical Society
- Norway Lake Lutheran Historical Association
- Atwater Area Historical Society
- Monongalia Historical Society

Kittson County

- Kittson County Historical Society

Koochiching County

- Koochiching County Historical Society

Lac qui Parle County

- Lac qui Parle County Historical Society

Lake County

- Lake County Historical Society
- Bay Area Historical Society
- Finland Minnesota Historical Society
- Historical Committee Of The Isabella Community Council

Lake of the Woods County

- Lake of the Woods County Historical Society

Le Sueur County

- Le Sueur County Historical Society

Lincoln County

- Lincoln County Historical Society
- Lake Benton Area Historical Society

Lyon County

- Balaton Area Historical Society
- Lyon County Historical Society
- Cottonwood Area Historical Society

Mahnomen County

- Mahnomen County Historical Society

Marshall County

- Marshall County Historical Society
- Argyle Historical Society
- Rosebank Historical Association

Martin County

- Martin County Historical Society
- Ceylon Area Historical Society
- Granada Historical Society
- Trimont Area Historical Society
- Truman Historical Association
- Welcome Historical Society

McLeod County

- McLeod County Historical Society
- Stewart Area Historical Society

Meeker County

- Meeker County Historical Society
- Dassel Area Historical Society
- Grove City Area Historical Society

Mille Lacs County

- Mille Lacs County Historical Society
- Mille Lacs Lake Historical Society
- Milaca Area Historical Society

Morrison County

- Morrison County Historical Society
- Military Historical Society Of Minnesota
- Motley Area Historical Society
- Royalton Historical Society
- Upsala Area Historical Society

Mower County

- Mower County Historical Society
- Adams Area Historical Society

Murray County

- Murray County Historical Society
- Fulda Heritage Society

Nicollet County

- Nicollet County Historical Society

Nobles County

- Nobles County Historical Society

Norman County

- Norman County Historical and Genealogy Society
- Red River History Museum

Olmsted County

- History Center of Olmsted County
- Oronoco Area History Center
- Stewartville Area Historical Society

Otter Tail County

- Otter Tail County Historical Society
- History Museum Of East Otter Tail County, Minnesota

Pennington County

- Pennington County Historical Society
- Goodridge Area Historical Society

Pine County

- Pine County Historical Society
- Pine City Area History Association

Pipestone County

- Pipestone County Historical Society
- Jasper Historical Society

Polk County

- Polk County Historical Society
- East Polk Heritage Center
- Sand Hill Settlement Historical Society

Pope County

- Pope County Historical Society

Ramsey County

- Ramsey County Historical Society
- Hill Farm Historical Society
- Little Canada Historical Society
- Maplewood Area Historical Society
- New Brighton Area Historical Society
- North St. Paul Historical Society
- Roseville Historical Society
- Shoreview Historical Society
- St. Paul Police Historical Society
- White Bear Lake Area Historical Society

Red Lake County

- Red Lake County Historical Society

Redwood County

- Redwood County Historical Society
- Lamberton Area Historical Society
- Lucan Historical Society Depot Museum

Renville County

- Renville County Historical Society
- Bechyn Historical Society
- Danube Historical Society
- Hector Historical Center
- Sacred Heart Area Historical Society

Rice County

- Rice County Historical Society
- Morristown Historical Society
- Northfield Historical Society

Rock County

- Rock County Historical Society

Roseau County

- Roseau County Historical Society
- Warroad Historical Society

Saint Louis County

- St. Louis County Historical Society
- Britt Community Historical Society
- Canosia Historical Society
- Ely-Winton Historical Society
- Hermantown Historical Society
- Hibbing Historical Society
- Iron Range Historical Society
- Proctor Area Historical Society
- Tower-Soudan Historical Society
- Virginia Area Historical Society

Scott County

- Scott County Historical Society
- Belle Plaine Historical Society
- Dan Patch Historical Society
- Jordan Area Historical Society
- Lydia Area Historical Society
- New Prague Historical Society
- Shakopee Heritage Society

Sherburne County

- Sherburne County Historical Society

Sibley County

- Sibley County Historical Society
- Arlington Historical Society, Minnesota
- Joseph R. Brown Heritage Society
- Winthrop Community Historical Society

Stearns County

- Albany Heritage Society
- Cold Spring Area Historical Society
- Kimball Area Historical Society
- Melrose Area Historical Society
- Paynesville Historical Society
- St. Joseph Area Historical Society
- Sartell Historical Society
- Sauk Centre Area Historical Society

Steele County

- Steele County Historical Society

Stevens County

- Stevens County Historical Society

Swift County

- Swift County Historical Society

Todd County

- Todd County Historical Museum
- Bertha Historical Society
- Eagle Bend Historical Society
- Hewitt Historical Society
- Staples Historical Society

Traverse County

- Traverse County Historical Society
- Browns Valley Historical Society

Wabasha County

- Wabasha County Historical Society
- Lake City Historical Society
- Plainview Area History Center

Wadena County, Minnesota

- Wadena County Historical Society
- Menahga Area Historical Society And Museum
- Sebeka Finnish Historical Society
- Verndale Historical Society

Waseca County

- Waseca County Historical Society

Washington County

- Washington County Historical Society
- Afton Historical Society
- Denmark Township Historical Society
- Marine Historical Society
- South Washington Heritage Society
- Woodbury Heritage Society

Watonwan County

- Watonwan County Historical Society
- St. James Historical Society

Wilkin County

- Wilkin County Historical Society

Winona County

- Winona County Historical Society
- Minnesota City Historical Association

Wright County

- Wright County Historical Society
- Cokato Historical Society
- Delano/Franklin Township Historical Society
- Hanover Historical Society
- Rockford Area Historical Society
- St. Michael Historical Society

Yellow Medicine County

- Yellow Medicine County Historical Society
- Granite Falls Historical Society

Statewide/Topical

- American Swedish Institute
- Danish American Center
- Germanic American Institute
- Great Northern Railway Historical Society
- Heritage Organization of Romanian Americans in Minnesota
- Hmong Archives
- Jewish Historical Society of the Upper Midwest
- Minnesota African American Heritage Museum and Gallery
- Minnesota Supreme Court Historical Society
- Minnesota Masonic Heritage Center
- Norwegian-American Historical Association
- Polish Cultural Institute and Museum

== See also ==
- History of Minnesota
- List of museums in Minnesota
- National Register of Historic Places listings in Minnesota
- List of historical societies in the United States
