= History of Minnesota =

The history of the U.S. state of Minnesota is shaped by its original Native American residents, European exploration and settlement, and the emergence of industries made possible by the state's natural resources. Early economic growth was based on fur trading, logging, milling and farming, and later through railroads and iron mining.

The earliest people followed herds of large game to the region during the last glacial period. They were the ancestors who preceded by thousands of years the recognized tribal communities of the Dakota, the Ioway, and other indigenous inhabitants. Fur traders from France arrived during the 17th century, as did the Anishinaabe. Europeans moving west during the 19th century drove out most of the Native Americans. Fort Snelling, built to protect United States territorial interests, brought early settlers to the future state. They used Saint Anthony Falls to power sawmills in the area that became Minneapolis, while others settled downriver in the area that became Saint Paul.

Minnesota's legal identity was created as the Minnesota Territory in 1849, and it became the 32nd U.S. state on May 11, 1858. After the chaos of the American Civil War and the Dakota War of 1862 ended, the state's economy grew when its timber and agriculture resources were developed. Railroads attracted immigrants, established the farm economy, and brought goods to market. The power provided by St. Anthony Falls spurred the growth of Minneapolis, and the innovative milling methods gave it the title of the "milling capital of the world".

New industry came from iron ore, discovered in the north, mined relatively easily from open pits, and shipped to Great Lakes steel mills from the ports at Duluth and Two Harbors. Economic development and social changes led to an expanded role for state government and a population shift from rural areas to cities. The Great Depression brought layoffs in mining and tension in labor relations, but New Deal programs helped the state. After World War II, Minnesota became known for technology, fueled by early computer companies Sperry Rand, Control Data, and Cray. The Twin Cities also became a regional center for the arts, with cultural institutions such as the Guthrie Theater, Minnesota Orchestra, and Walker Art Center.

== Native American habitation ==
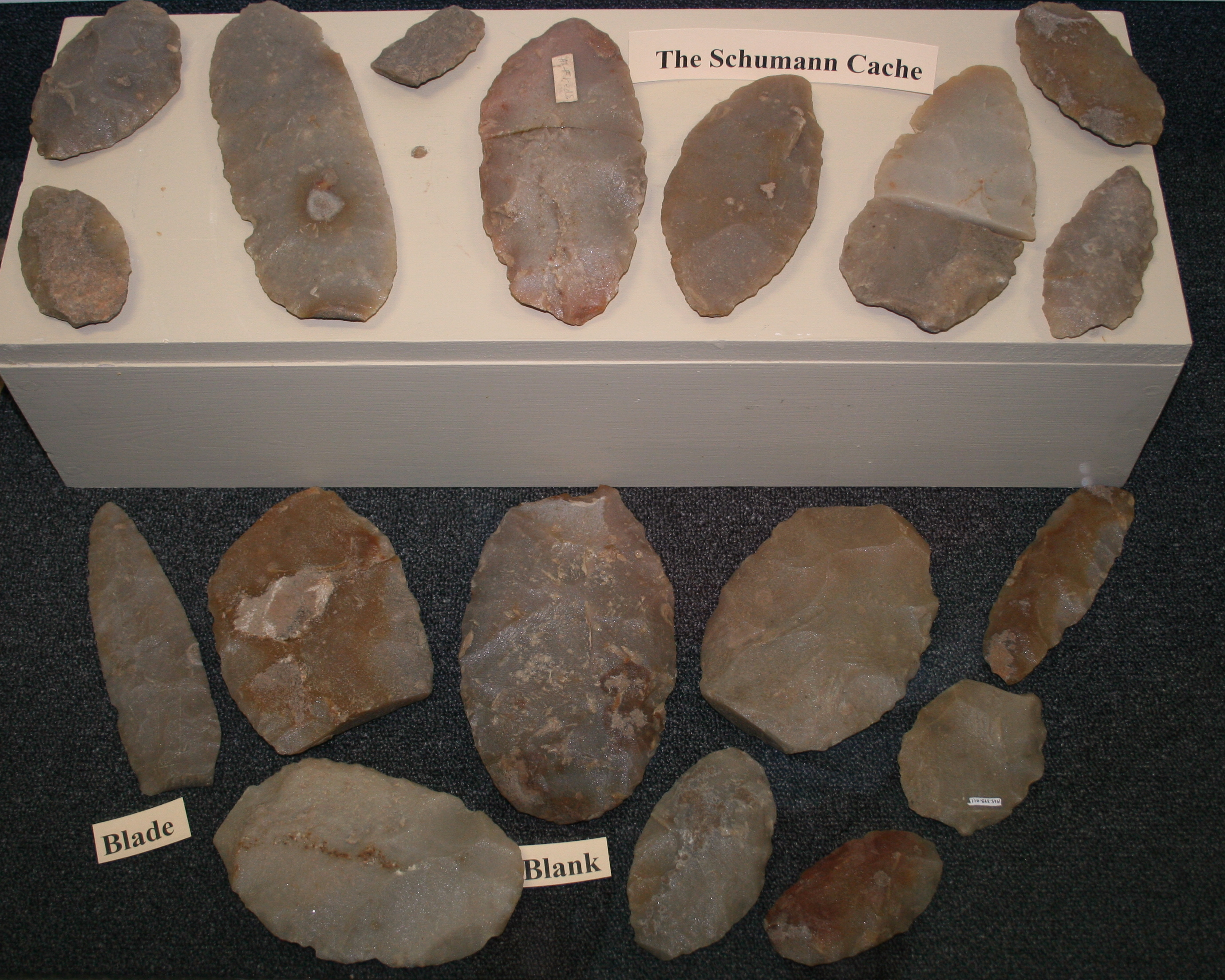
Some of the oldest stone tools found in Minnesota

=== Earliest people in the state ===
The oldest known human remains in Minnesota, dating back about 9,000 years ago, were discovered near Browns Valley in 1933. "Browns Valley Man" was found with tools of the Clovis and Folsom types. Some of the earliest evidence of a sustained presence in the area comes from a site known as Bradbury Brook near Mille Lacs Lake which was used around 7500 BC. Subsequently, extensive trading networks developed in the region. The body of an early resident known as "Minnesota Woman" was discovered in 1931 in Otter Tail County. Radiocarbon dating places the age of the bones approximately 8000 years ago, approximately 7890 ±70 BP or near the end of the Eastern Archaic period. She had a conch shell from a snail species known as Busycon perversa, which had previously only been known to exist in Florida.

Several hundred years later, the climate of Minnesota warmed significantly. As large animals such as mammoths became extinct, native people changed their diet. They gathered nuts, berries, and vegetables, and they hunted smaller animals such as deer, bison, and birds. The stone tools found from this era became smaller and more specialized to use these new food sources. They also devised new techniques for catching fish, such as fish hooks, nets, and harpoons. Around 5000 BC, people on the shores of Lake Superior (in Minnesota and portions of what is now Michigan, Wisconsin, and Canada) were the first on the continent to begin making metal tools. Pieces of ore with high concentrations of copper were initially pounded into a rough shape, heated to reduce brittleness, pounded again to refine the shape, and reheated. Edges could be made sharp enough to be useful as knives or spear points.

=== Later precontact history ===
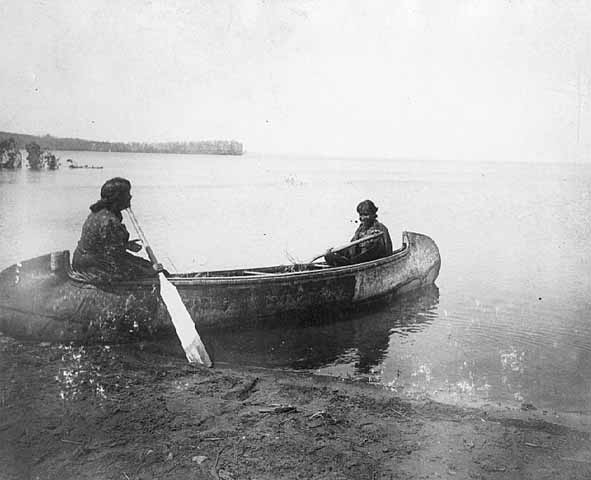
Ojibwa women in a canoe at Leech Lake Minnesota in 1909

Archaeological evidence of Native American presence dates between 2,500 and 5,000 years ago at the Jeffers Petroglyphs site in southwest Minnesota. The exposed Sioux Quartzite rock is dotted with several thousand petroglyphs thought to date to the Late Archaic Period (3000 BC to 1000 BC). Around 700 BC, burial mounds were first created, and the practice continued until the arrival of Europeans, when 10,000 to 11,000 such mounds dotted the state. The Hopewell burial mounds in Saint Paul are protected from invasive modern tourism.

Archaeologists believe native peoples discovered the catlinite deposit at Pipestone over 3,000 years ago. Word of its existence spread and a quarry developed that was sacred ground to the native peoples across a vast area. When the French Voyageurs arrived in the region in the 1600s they learned of the quarry in their bartering with the indigenous peoples. In 1858, the same year Minnesota became a state, the Yankton Sioux Tribe signed the Yankton Treaty in which they gave up their lands in western Minnesota and South Dakota. However, section 8 of the treaty gave the Yankton nation a one-mile square reservation at the quarry site. In 1893 the site was sold to the US Government and in 1937 FDR signed the bill creating the Pipestone National Monument. Today the quarry remains active and is restricted exclusively to Native Americans by treaty with the National Park Service. At present there are 23 tribal nations affiliated by treaty to the Monument based upon their historic ties with Pipestone.

By AD 800, wild rice became a staple crop in the region, and corn farther to the south. Within a few hundred years, the Mississippian culture reached into the southeast portion of the state, and large villages were formed. The Dakota Native American culture may have descended from some of the peoples of the Mississippian culture.

=== European colonization ===
When Europeans first started exploring Minnesota, the region was inhabited primarily by tribal communities of Dakota people, who called the area "Mni Sóta Makoce, meaning "the land where the water reflects the skies." The Ojibwa (sometimes called Chippewa, or Anishinaabe began to migrate westward into the state around 1700. (Other sources suggest the Ojibwe reached Minnesota by 1620 or earlier.) There were also the Chiwere Ioway in the southwest, and possibly the Menominee in some parts of the southeast as well as other tribes which could have been either Algonquian or Chiwere to the northeast, alongside Lake Superior (possibilities include the Fauk, Sauk, and Missouria). The economy of these tribes was chiefly based on hunter-gatherer activities. There was also a small group of Ho-Chunk (Winnebago) Native Americans near Long Prairie, who later moved to a reservation in Blue Earth County in 1855.

At some early point, the Missouria moved south into what is now Missouri, the Menominee ceded much of their westernmost lands and withdrew closer to the region of Green Bay, Wisconsin, and the A'ani were pushed north and west by the Dakota and split into the Gros Ventre and the Arapaho. Later tribes who would inhabit the region include the Assiniboine, who split from the Dakota and returned to Minnesota, but later also moved west as American settlers came to populate the region.

The word Minnesota comes from the Dakota phrase Mni Sóta Makoce, which is depicted on the only state seal in the US to include an Indigenous phrase.

== European exploration ==
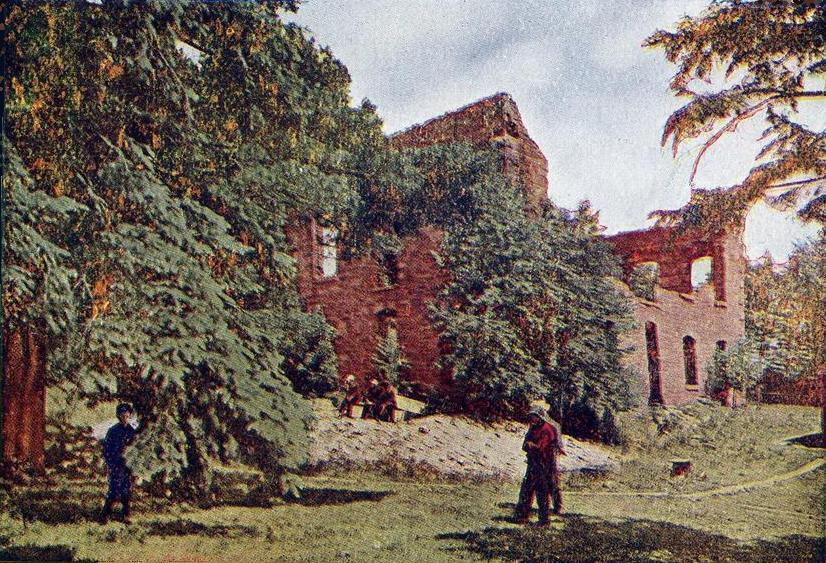
Ruins of old Fond du Lac trading post on the Saint Louis River in 1907

=== 17th century ===
In the late 1650s, Pierre Esprit Radisson and Médard des Groseilliers, while following the southern shore of Lake Superior (which would become northern Wisconsin), were probably the first Europeans to meet Dakota Native Americans . The north shore of the lake was explored in the 1660s. Among the first to do this was Claude Allouez, a missionary on Madeline Island. He made an early map of the area in 1671.

Around this time, the Ojibwa Native Americans reached Minnesota as part of a westward migration. Having come from a region around Maine, they had experience dealing with European traders. They sold furs and purchased guns. Tensions rose between the Ojibwa and Dakota in the ensuing years.

In 1671, France signed a treaty with a number of tribes to allow trade. Shortly thereafter, French trader Daniel Greysolon, Sieur du Lhut, arrived in the area and began trading with the local tribes. Du Lhut explored the western area of Lake Superior, near his namesake, the city of Duluth, and areas south of there. He helped to arrange a peace treaty between the Dakota and Ojibwa tribes in 1679.

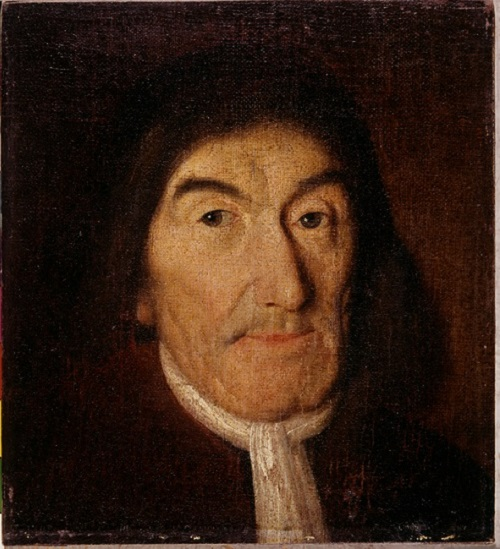
Portrait of Louis Hennepin, 1694

Father Louis Hennepin, with companions Michel Aco and Antoine Auguelle (a.k.a. Picard Du Gay), headed north from the area of modern Illinois after coming into that area with an exploration party headed by René-Robert Cavelier, Sieur de La Salle. They were captured by a Dakota tribe in 1680. While with the tribe, they came across and named the Falls of Saint Anthony. Soon, Du Lhut was able to obtain through negotiation the release of Hennepin's party. Hennepin returned to Europe and wrote a book, Description of Louisiana, published in 1683, about his travels; many portions, including the part about Saint Anthony Falls, were strongly embellished. As an example, he described the falls as having a drop of 50 to 60 feet (15–18 m), when they were really only about 16 feet (4.9 m). Pierre-Charles Le Sueur explored the Minnesota River to the Blue Earth area around 1700. He thought the blue earth was a source of copper, and he told stories about the possibility of mineral wealth, but there actually was no copper in it.

=== 18th century ===
Explorers searching for the fabled Northwest Passage and large inland seas in North America continued to pass through the state. In 1721, the French built Fort Beauharnois on Lake Pepin. In 1731, the Grand Portage trail was first traversed by a European, Pierre La Vérendrye. He used a map written down on a piece of birch bark by Ochagach, an Assiniboine guide. The North West Company, which traded in fur and competed with the Hudson's Bay Company, was established along the Grand Portage in 1783–1784.

Jonathan Carver, a shoemaker from Massachusetts, visited the area in 1767 as part of another expedition. He and the rest of the exploration party were only able to stay for a relatively short period, due to a lack of supplies. They headed back east to Fort Michilimackinac, where Carver wrote journals about the trip, though others would later claim the stories were largely plagiarized. The stories were published in 1778, but Carver died before the book earned him much money. Carver County and Carver's Cave (Wakan Tipi) are named for him.

=== 19th century ===
In 1817, Major Stephen Harriman Long headed a military excursion up the Mississippi River to the Falls of St. Anthony near the confluence with the Minnesota River. As a result of his recommendations, the Army established Fort Snelling to guard against Indian incursions against settlers in the Upper Mississippi Valley. Long recorded his experiences of the expedition in a journal, which was first published as Voyage in a Six-Oared Skiff to the Falls of St. Anthony, by the Minnesota Historical Society in 1860.

In 1822 the Earl of Selkirk acquired a controlling interest in the Hudson's Bay Company. Through the Company he acquired 116,000 square miles (300,000 km^{2}) of land that today (2021) make up Manitoba and the northern portions of North Dakota and Minnesota. Until 1818 the Red River Valley was considered part of British North America, and several colonization plans were mounted to the region, such as the Red River Colony. The boundary where the Red River crossed the 49th parallel was not marked until 1823, when Long returned to the region to conduct another survey expedition. When several hundred settlers abandoned the Red River Colony in the 1820s, they entered United States territory along the Red River Valley, going south to Fort Snelling. The region had been occupied by Métis people, the children of voyageurs and Native Americans, since the middle of the 17th century.

Several efforts were made to find the source of the Mississippi River. The true source was found in 1832 when Henry Schoolcraft was guided by a group of Ojibwa headed by Ozaawindib ("Yellow Head") to a lake in northern Minnesota. Schoolcraft named it Lake Itasca, combining the Latin words veritas ("truth") and caput ("head"). The native name for the lake was Omashkooz, meaning elk. Other explorers of the area include Zebulon Pike in 1806, Major Stephen Long in 1817, and George William Featherstonhaugh in 1835. Featherstonhaugh conducted a geological survey of the Minnesota River Valley and wrote an account, entitled A Canoe Voyage up the Minnay Sotor.

Joseph Nicollet scouted the area in the late 1830s, exploring and mapping the Upper Mississippi River basin, the St. Croix River, and the land between the Mississippi and Missouri Rivers. He and John C. Frémont left their mark in the southwest part of the state, carving their names in the pipestone quarries near Winnewissa Falls (an area now part of Pipestone National Monument, in Pipestone County).

Henry Wadsworth Longfellow never explored the state, but he did help to make it popular. In 1855 he published The Song of Hiawatha, which contains references to Minnehaha Falls and Pipestone, both in Minnesota. The story is based on Ojibwa legends carried back east by other explorers and traders (particularly those collected by Henry Rowe Schoolcraft).

== Territorial foundation and settlement ==
=== Land acquisition ===
Map of Minnesota Territory (1849–1858)

All of the land east of the Mississippi River was granted to the United States by the Second Treaty of Paris, which in 1783 ended the American Revolution. This included what would become modern-day Saint Paul but only part of Minneapolis, along with the northeast, north-central, and east-central portions of the future state. The western portion of the state was part of Spanish Louisiana since the Treaty of Fontainebleau (1762). The wording of the treaty in the Minnesota area depended on landmarks reported by fur traders, who erroneously reported an "Isle Phelipeaux" in Lake Superior, a "Long Lake" west of the island, and the belief that the Mississippi River ran well into modern Canada. Most of the state—the area west of the Mississippi—was purchased in 1803 from France as part of the Louisiana Purchase. Parts of northern Minnesota were considered to be in Rupert's Land. The exact definition of the boundary between Minnesota and British North America was not addressed until the Anglo-American Convention of 1818, which set the U.S.–Canada border at the 49th parallel west of the Lake of the Woods (except for a small chunk of land now dubbed the Northwest Angle). Border disputes east of Lake of the Woods continued until the Webster-Ashburton Treaty of 1842.

During the first half of the 19th century, the northeastern portion of the state was a part of the Northwest Territory, then the Illinois Territory, then the Michigan Territory, and finally the Wisconsin Territory. The western and southern areas of the state, although theoretically part of the Wisconsin Territory from its creation in 1836, were not formally organized until 1838, when they became part of the Iowa Territory.

=== Establishment of Fort Snelling, Minneapolis and Saint Paul ===
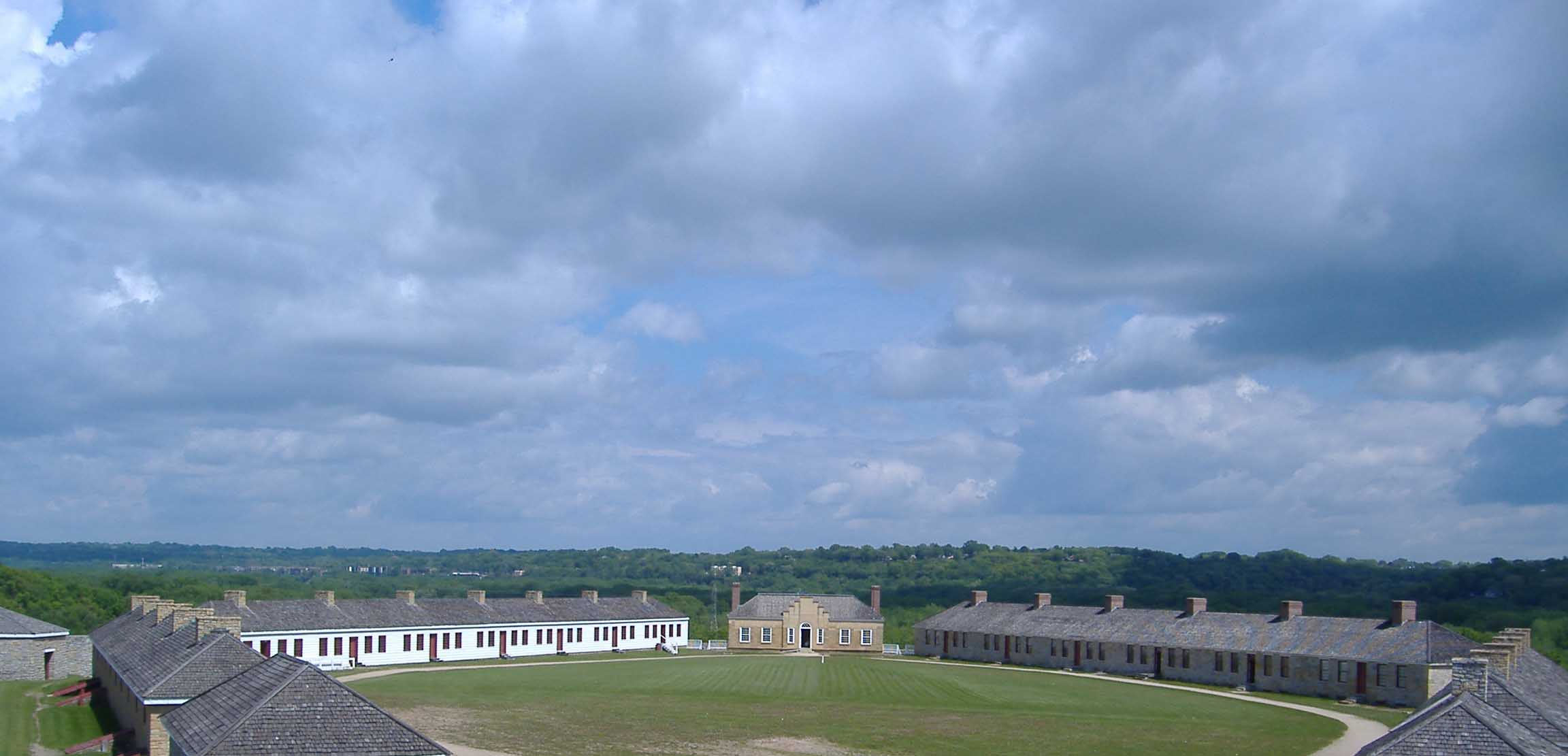
Fort Snelling

Fort Snelling was the first U.S. military post in the state. The land for the fort encompassed the confluence of the Minnesota and Mississippi rivers and was acquired in 1805 by Lt. Zebulon Pike. When concerns mounted about the fur trade in the area, construction of the fort began in 1819, and was completed in 1825, named after Colonel Josiah Snelling.

Slaves Dred Scott and his wife were taken to the fort by their master, John Emerson. They lived at the fort and elsewhere in territories where slavery was prohibited. After Emerson's death, the Scotts argued that since they had lived in free territory, they were no longer slaves. The U.S. Supreme Court sided against the Scotts in Dred Scott v. Sandford. Dred Scott Field, located just a short distance away in Bloomington, is named in memory of Fort Snelling's significance in one of the most important legal decisions in U.S. history.

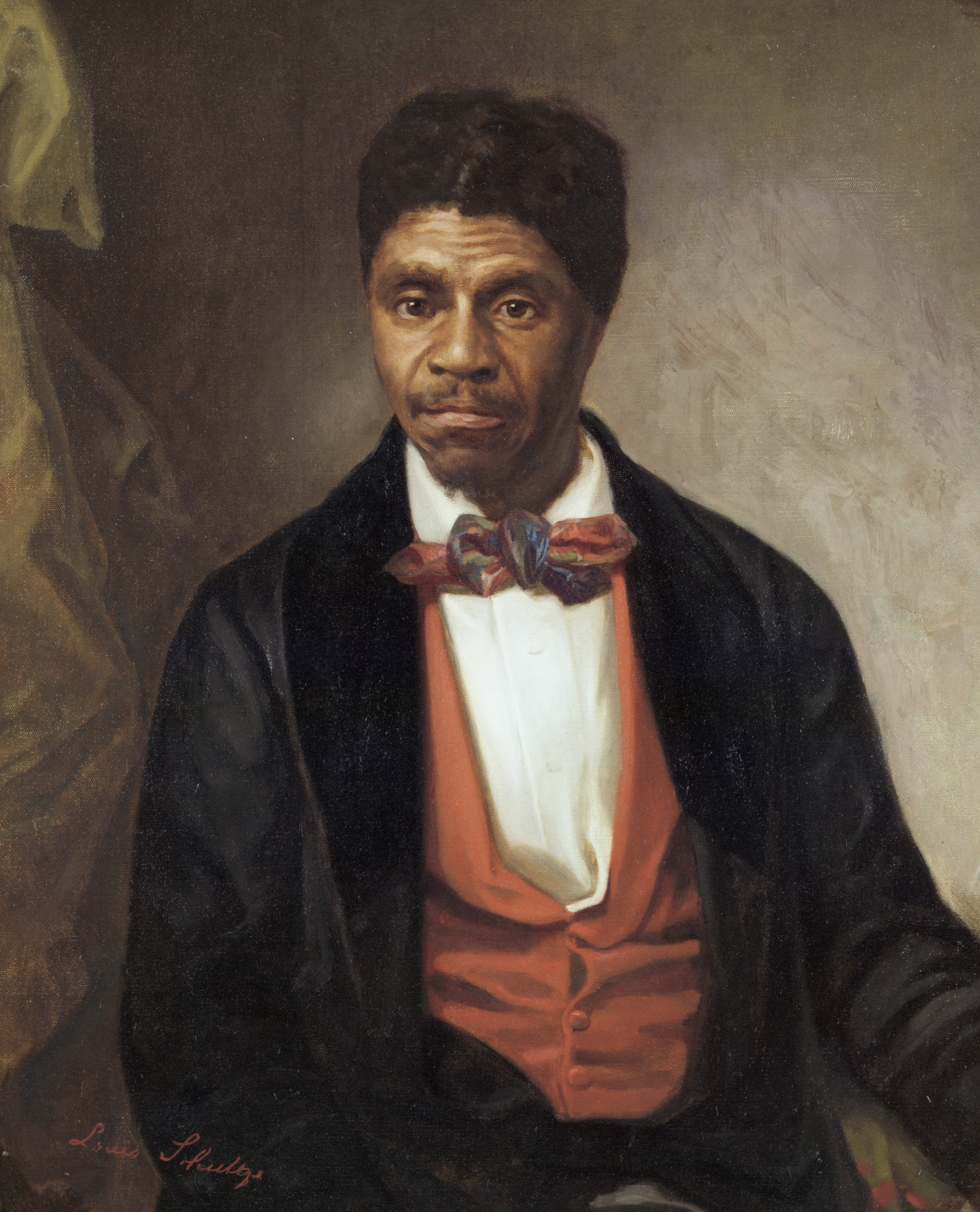
Dred Scott

By 1851, treaties between Native American tribes and the U.S. government had opened much of Minnesota to settlement, so Fort Snelling no longer was a frontier outpost. It served as a training center for soldiers during the American Civil War and later as the headquarters for the Department of Dakota. A portion has been designated as Fort Snelling National Cemetery where over 160,000 are interred. During World War II, the fort served as a training center for nearly 300,000 inductees. Fort Snelling is now a historic site operated by the Minnesota Historical Society.

Fort Snelling was largely responsible for the establishment of the city of Minneapolis. The fort garrison built roads, planted crops, and built a grist mill and a sawmill at Saint Anthony Falls. Later, Franklin Steele came to Fort Snelling as the post sutler. He established interests in lumbering and operated the ferries serving the fort from St. Paul and Mendota. When the Ojibwe signed a treaty ceding lands in 1837, Steele staked a claim to land on the east side of the Mississippi River adjacent to Saint Anthony Falls. In 1848, he built a sawmill at the falls, and the community of Saint Anthony developed along the east side of the falls. Steele told one of his employees, John H. Stevens, that land on the west side of the falls would make a good site for future mills. Since the land on the west side was still part of the military reservation, Stevens made a deal with Fort Snelling's commander. Stevens would provide free ferry service across the river in exchange for a tract of 160 acres (0.65 km^{2}) at the head of the falls. Stevens received the claim and built a house, the first house in Minneapolis, in 1850. In 1854, Stevens platted the city of Minneapolis on the west bank. Later, in 1872, Minneapolis absorbed the city of Saint Anthony.

The city of Saint Paul, Minnesota is also a Fort Snelling development. Squatters, mostly from the ill-fated Red River Colony in what is now Manitoba, established a camp near the fort. The commandant of Fort Snelling, Major Joseph Plympton, found their presence problematic because they were using resources that the fort required; timber, firewood and grazing lands around the fort. Plympton banned lumbering and evicted the squatters from the military reservation. As a result, they moved four miles downstream on the Mississippi River to Fountain cave. This location was not quite far enough for Plympton, so the squatters were forced out again. Pierre "Pig's Eye" Parrant, established a moonshine trade there with both the soldiers and Sioux. The settlement got the name "Pig's Eye" when a customer at Parrant's tavern wrote a letter with "Pig's Eye" as the return address. The reply to that letter was delivered directly to the settlement. In 1840, the Roman Catholic Diocese of Dubuque sent Father Lucien Galtier as a missionary to the settlement. Galtier built a small log church and dedicated it to Saint Paul. The nearby steamboat landing took on the name "St. Paul's Landing", and by 1846, when a post office was opened, the area was known as St. Paul. Before white settlement, the Mdewakanton Sioux knew the area as Im-in-i-ja Ska, meaning "White Rock", which describes the sandstone bluffs adjacent to Carver's Cave.

Minneapolis and Saint Paul are collectively known as the Twin Cities. Minneapolis is the largest city in Minnesota, with a population of 429,954 in the 2020 census. Saint Paul is smaller with a population of 311,527 in 2020. Minneapolis-Saint Paul are the core of the MPLS metropolitan area with a population of 3,690,261 as of 2020, with a total state population of 5,706,494.

=== Early European settlement and development ===
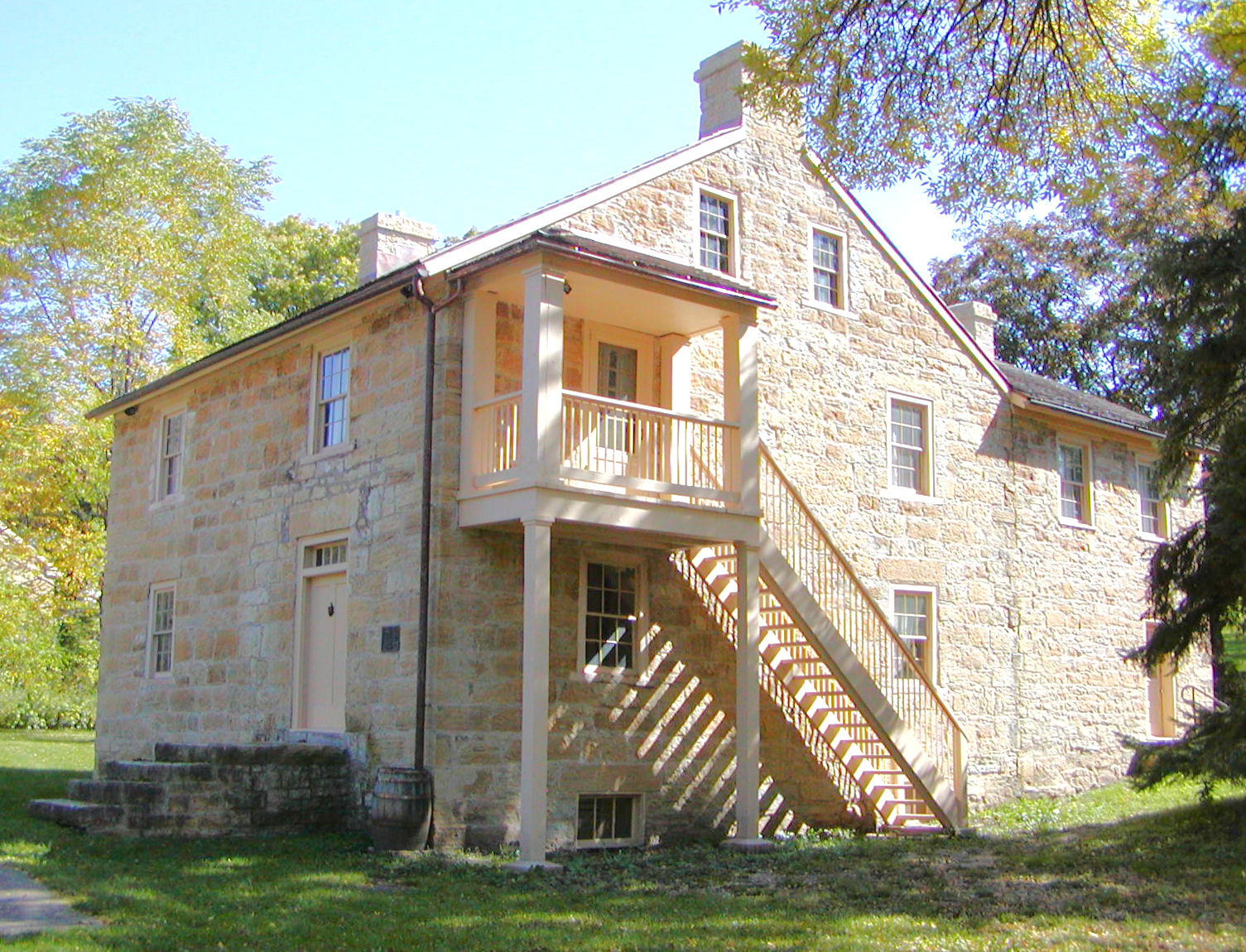
Home of Henry Hastings Sibley

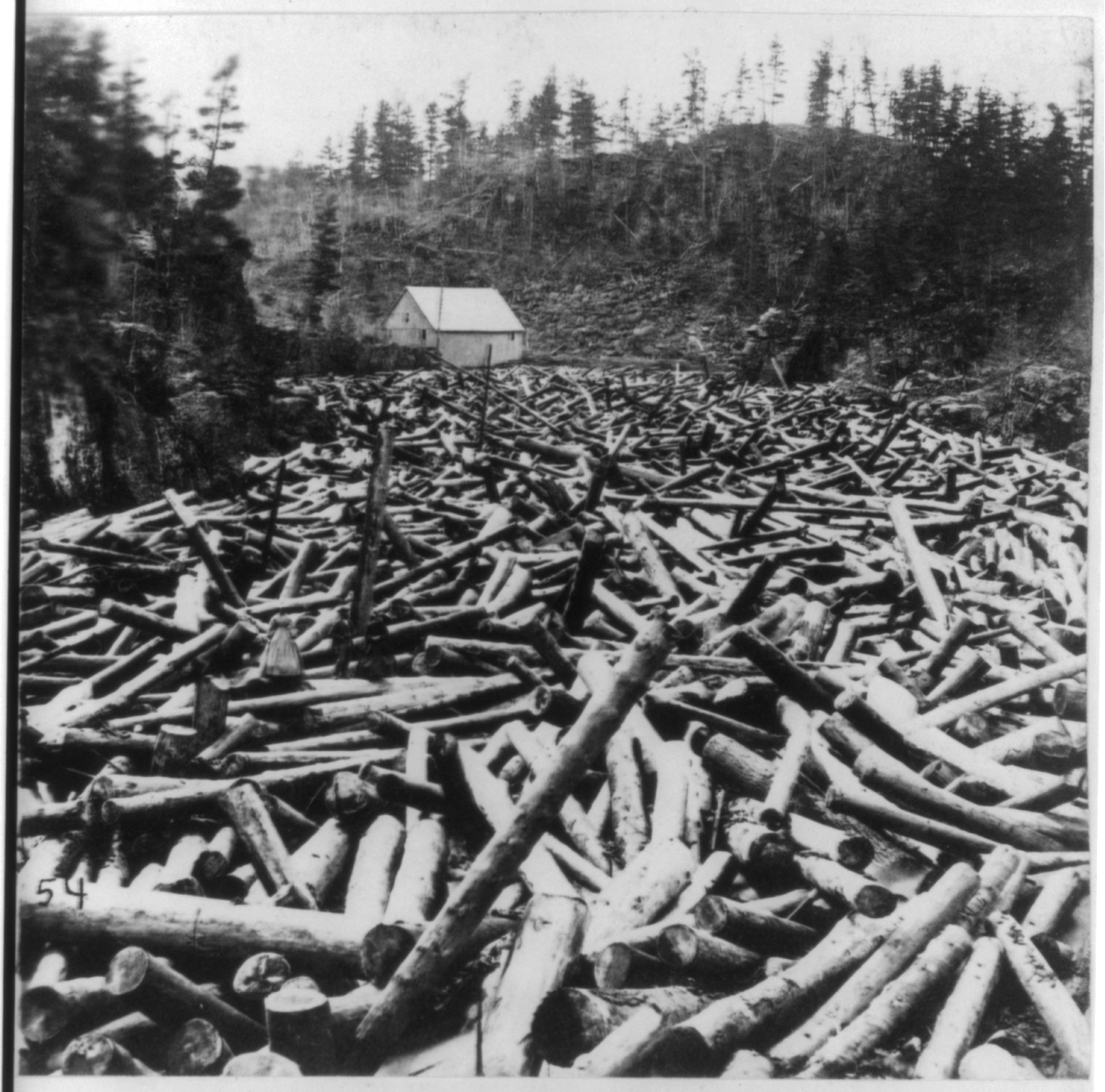
Logging pine c. 1860s–1870s

Henry Hastings Sibley built the first stone house in the Minnesota Territory in Mendota in 1838, along with other limestone buildings used by the American Fur Company, which bought animal pelts at that location from 1825 to 1853. Another area of early economic development in Minnesota was the logging industry. Loggers found the white pine especially valuable, and it was plentiful in the northeastern section of the state and in the St. Croix River valley. Before railroads, lumbermen relied mostly on river transportation to bring logs to market, which made Minnesota's timber resources attractive. Towns like Pine City, Marine on St. Croix and Stillwater became important lumber centers fed by the St. Croix River, while Winona became an important lumber market because of its proximity to farms that were developing in the south of the state. The unregulated logging practices of the time and a severe drought took their toll in 1894, when the Great Hinckley Fire ravaged 480 square miles (1,200 km^{2}) in the Hinckley and Sandstone areas of Pine County, killing over 400 residents. The combination of logging and drought struck again in the Baudette Fire of 1910 and the Cloquet Fire of 1918.

Saint Anthony, on the east bank of the Mississippi River later became part of Minneapolis, and was an important lumber milling center supplied by the Rum River. In 1848, businessman Franklin Steele built the first private sawmill on the Saint Anthony Falls, and more sawmills quickly followed. The oldest wood-frame home still standing in Saint Anthony is the Ard Godfrey house, built in 1848, and lived in by Ard and Harriet Godfrey. The house of John H. Stevens, the first house on the west bank in Minneapolis, was moved several times, finally to Minnehaha Park in south Minneapolis in 1896.

=== Minnesota Territory ===
On August 26, 1848, shortly after Wisconsin was admitted to the Union, a convention of sixty-one met in Stillwater to petition Congress to create a Minnesota Territory from the remainder of the Wisconsin and Iowa Territories. The delegate chosen to bring the convention's petition before Congress was Henry Hastings Sibley. Stephen A. Douglas (D), the chair of the Senate Committee on Territories, drafted the bill authorizing Minnesota Territory. He had envisioned a future for the upper Mississippi valley, so he was motivated to keep the area from being carved up by neighboring territories. In 1846, he prevented Iowa from including Fort Snelling and Saint Anthony Falls within its northern border. In 1847, he kept the organizers of Wisconsin from including Saint Paul and Saint Anthony Falls. The Minnesota Territory was established from the lands remaining from Iowa Territory and Wisconsin Territory on March 3, 1849. The Minnesota Territory extended far into what is now North Dakota and South Dakota, to the Missouri River. There was a dispute over the shape of the state to be carved out of Minnesota Territory. An alternate proposal that was only narrowly defeated would have made the 46th parallel the state's northern border and the Missouri River its western border, thus giving up the whole northern half of the state in exchange for the eastern half of what later became South Dakota.

With Alexander Ramsey (W) as the first governor of Minnesota Territory and Henry Hastings Sibley (D) as the territorial delegate to the United States Congress. Ramsey lobbied Congress for funds to build five military roads in the Territory: Mendota/Fort Snelling to Wabasha, Point Douglas to Fort Ripley/Crow River Indian Agency, Mendota/Fort Snelling to the Missouri River, Point Douglas to Superior, and Fort Ripley Road to Long Prairie Indian Agency. The populations of Saint Paul and Saint Anthony swelled. Henry M. Rice (D), who replaced Sibley as the territorial delegate in 1853, worked in Congress to promote Minnesota interests. He lobbied for the construction of a railroad connecting Saint Paul and Lake Superior, with a link from Saint Paul to the Illinois Central. Another military road would run from Fort Ridgely to South Pass, Nebraska Territory.

=== Statehood ===
In December 1856, Henry Mower Rice brought forward two bills in Congress: an enabling act that would allow Minnesota to form a state constitution, and a railroad land grant bill. Rice's enabling act defined a state containing both prairie and forest lands. The state was bounded on the south by Iowa, on the east by Wisconsin, on the north by Canada, and on the west by the Red River of the North and the Bois de Sioux River, Lake Traverse, Big Stone Lake, and then a line extending due south to the Iowa border. Rice made this motion based on Minnesota's population growth.

At the time, tensions between the northern and the southern United States were growing, in a series of conflicts that eventually resulted in the American Civil War. There was little debate in the United States House of Representatives, but when Stephen A. Douglas introduced the bill in the United States Senate, it caused a firestorm of debate. Northerners saw their chance to add two senators to the side of the free states, while Southerners were sure that they would lose power. Many senators offered polite arguments that the population was too sparse and that statehood was premature. Senator John Burton Thompson of Kentucky, in particular, argued that new states would cost the government too much for roads, canals, forts, and lighthouses. Although Thompson and 21 other senators voted against statehood, the enabling act was passed on February 26, 1857.

After the enabling act was passed, territorial legislators had a difficult time writing a state constitution. A constitutional convention was assembled in July 1857, but Republicans and Democrats were deeply divided. In fact, they formed two separate constitutional conventions and drafted two separate constitutions. Eventually, the two groups formed a conference committee and worked out a common constitution. The divisions continued, though, because Republicans refused to sign a document that had Democratic signatures on it, and vice versa. One copy of the constitution was written on white paper and signed only by Republicans, while the other copy was written on blue-tinged paper and signed by Democrats. These copies were signed on August 29, 1857. An election was called on October 13, 1857, where Minnesota residents would vote to approve or disapprove the constitution. The constitution was approved by 30,055 voters, while 571 rejected it. Assuming the constitution would come into effect almost immediately, state offices were elected, although none actually took office. Among these was Henry Hastings Sibley, who was to be the first Governor of the state once statehood was granted. In the time between the election and statehood, Territorial Secretary Charles L. Chase declared himself acting Governor (due to the actual territorial governor Samuel Medary spending most of his time in other states) despite technically holding no constitutional authority.

The state constitution was sent to the United States Congress for ratification in December 1857. The approval process was drawn out for several months while Congress debated over issues that had stemmed from the Kansas–Nebraska Act. Southerners had been arguing that the next state should be pro-slavery, so when Kansas submitted the pro-slavery Lecompton Constitution, the Minnesota statehood bill was delayed. After that, Northerners feared that Minnesota's Democratic delegation would support slavery in Kansas. Finally, after the Kansas question was settled and after Congress decided how many representatives Minnesota would get in the House of Representatives, the bill passed. The eastern half of the Minnesota Territory, under the boundaries defined by Rice, became the country's 32nd state on May 11, 1858. The western part remained unorganized until its incorporation into the Dakota Territory on March 2, 1861.

== Military conflicts ==
=== Civil War ===
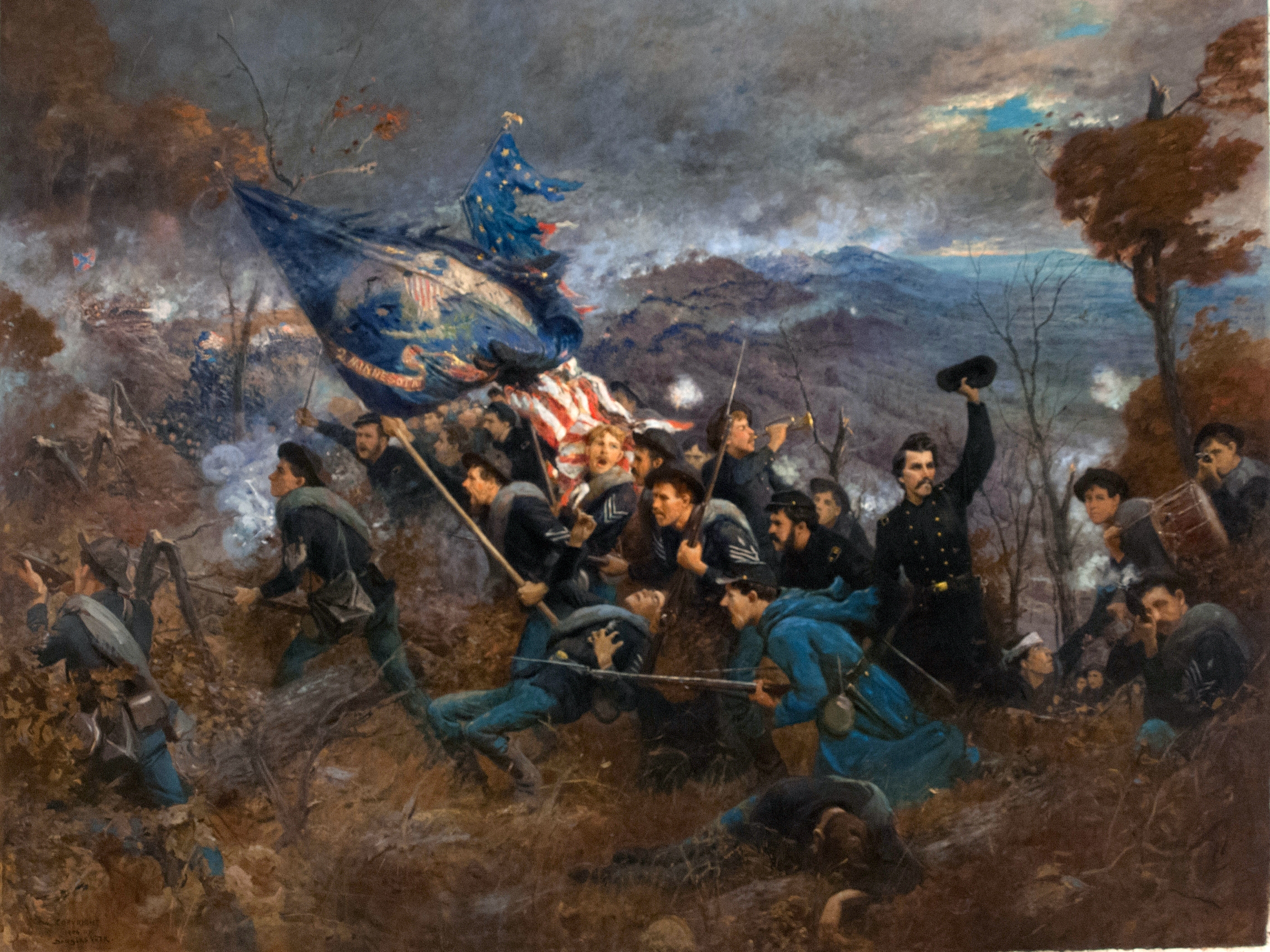
The Second Minnesota Regiment at Missionary Ridge by Douglas Volk

When news broke in 1861 that Fort Sumter had been fired on, Gov. Ramsey happened to be in Washington, D.C., and rushed to the White House to give President Abraham Lincoln Minnesota's support, being the first Union governor to do so. The soldiers of the 1st Minnesota Infantry Regiment were the first soldiers offered to fight for the Union Army. Minnesota had more than 24,000 troops serve in the Civil War, about one-seventh of the state's population in 1860. Nearly 3,000 lost their lives to battlefield wounds or disease.

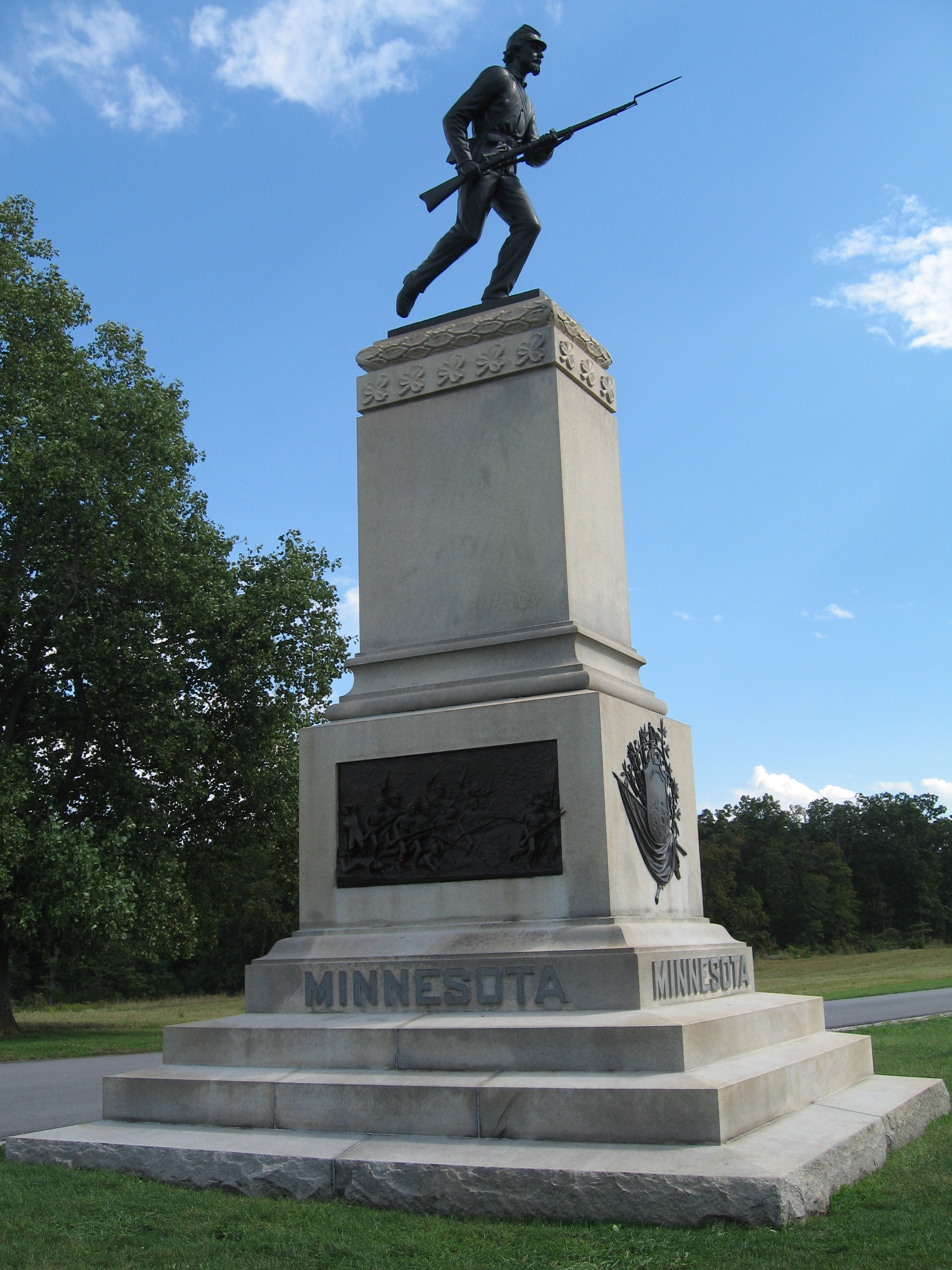
The 1st Minnesota Monument at the Gettysburg National Military Park

The 1st Minnesota changed the course of the decisive Battle of Gettysburg. Desperate to make time for reinforcements to arrive, on Gettysburg's second day, July 2, 1863, General Winfield Scott Hancock sent the 262 members of 1st Minnesota to halt a Confederate assault. They succeeded in capturing a Confederate flag and held the line for the Union, but all but 47 of them were killed, wounded, or captured. The regiment lost 17 more facing Pickett's Charge to end the battle the next day. Lt. Col. William F. Fox wrote that "the percentage of loss in the First Minnesota, Gibbon's Division [is] without an equal in the records of modern warfare". Explaining his role in ordering the First Minnesota in, Hancock is quoted, "There is no more gallant deed recorded in history ..."

By the end of the war, Minnesota had raised 11 regiments of infantry, two sharpshooter units, and some cavalry and artillery.

=== Dakota War of 1862 ===
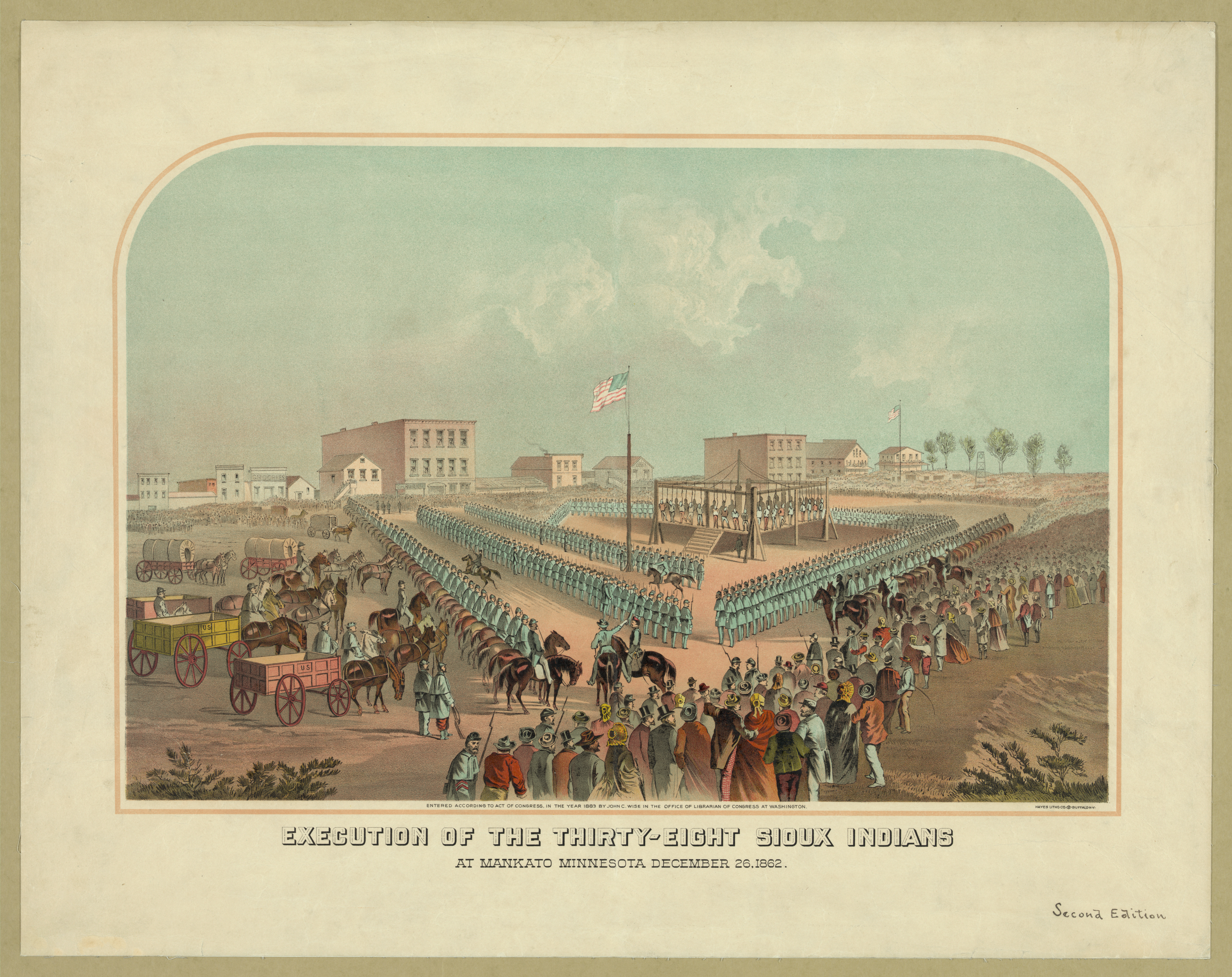
Mass hanging in Mankato, Minnesota

During the Civil War, the state faced another crisis as the Dakota War of 1862 broke out. As white settlement pressed in, the Dakota were destitute, even starving because of the loss of habitat of huntable game. Dakota had signed the Treaty of Traverse des Sioux and Treaty of Mendota in 1851. They were given a strip of land of 10 miles (16 km) north and south of the Minnesota River, but were later forced to sell the northern half. In 1862, crop failures left the Dakota with food shortages, and government money was delayed.

The conflict was ignited when four young Dakota men, searching for food, killed a family of white settlers on August 17. That night, a faction of Little Crow's Dakota decided to try and drive all settlers out of the Minnesota River valley. In the weeks that followed, Dakota warriors attacked and killed hundreds of settlers, causing thousands to flee the area. The ensuing battles at the Lower Sioux Agency, Fort Ridgely, Birch Coulee, and Wood Lake punctuated a six-week war, which ended with the trial of 425 Indians for their participation in the war. Of this number, 303 were convicted and sentenced to death. Bishop Henry Benjamin Whipple pled to President Abraham Lincoln for clemency, and the death sentences of all but 39 Sioux were reduced to prison terms. On December 26, 1862, 38 Sioux were hanged in the largest mass execution in the United States.

Many of the remaining Dakota Indians, including non-combatants were confined in a prison camp at Pike Island over the winter of 1862–1863, where between 125 and 300 died of disease. They were later exiled to the Crow Creek Reservation, and then to a reservation near Niobrara, Nebraska. A small number of Dakota Indians returned to Minnesota in the 1880s and established small communities near Granite Falls, Morton, Prior Lake, and Red Wing.

=== Spanish-American War and Philippine-American War ===
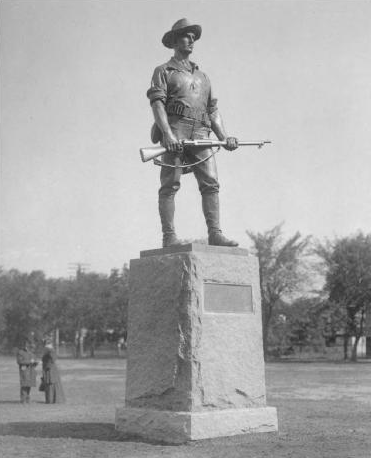
"The Hiker" by Theo A.R. Kitson c.1906 at the University of Minnesota

When the United States entered the Spanish–American War on April 25, 1898 volunteer troops were raised throughout the United States to supplement the Regular Army. Various units of the Minnesota National Guard formed the nucleus of the newly created Minnesota regiments for the war with Spain. According to the book Minnesota in the Spanish-American War and the Philippine Insurrection by Franklin F. Holbrook, these units consisted of "three regiments of infantry, one battalion of artillery, and a medical corps, with a total membership of approximately two thousand officers and men". In total, Minnesota tendered four regiments to the conflict, those regiments being the 12th Minnesota Infantry Regiment, the 13th Minnesota Infantry Regiment, the 14th Minnesota Infantry Regiment, and the 15th Minnesota Infantry Regiment. According to the Minnesota Military and Veterans Museum, Minnesota volunteered a total of 5,348 officers and enlisted men to the two conflicts. The 13th Minnesota Infantry Regiment was the only regiment from the state to see action during the two conflicts when it was deployed during the Spanish-American War in 1898. The regiment saw action at the Battle of Manila during the war and later took part in the Philippine–American War at the Second Battle of Caloocan, the Capture of Malolos, and the Luzon Expedition.

=== World War I ===
When the United States entered the First World War, Minnesota's National Guard was activated for federal service. To fill that void the State created the Minnesota Home Guard. The 16th Battalion, Minnesota Home Guard was the first African American unit formed by the State of Minnesota. Companies A, B, and band were formed in St. Paul while C and D Companies came from Minneapolis. Because of the bigotry the soldiers experienced at enlistment, they insisted their officers be black. When the war ended the Home guard was disbanded, however, there was community support for the 16th being incorporated into the National guard. Instead, in April 1919, the Minnesota Legislature approved the formation of the First Infantry Battalion of the Minnesota Militia. It was segregated and not an official unit of the state guard.

Fort Snelling was converted to a rehabilitation hospital for veterans, and treated victims of the 1918 influenza pandemic.

=== World War II ===
Naval reservists of the Minnesota Naval Militia were manning the USS Ward at the entrance of Pearl Harbor on December 7, 1941. Sailors on the USS Ward fired at a Japanese minisub attempting to enter the harbor that morning in what is credited as the United States' first shot of World War II. Like other U.S. States, Minnesota contributed to the war effort. The United States Navy gave Cargill shipbuilding contracts after seeing their ability to build ships and barges for transporting grain. From facilities in Savage, Minnesota on the south bank of the Minnesota River, Cargill launched 18 refueling ships and 4 towboats for the war. After the war, Cargill transitioned those facilities into a major grain shipping terminal.

The War Department created the Twin Cities Army Ammunition Plant to produce munitions in Arden Hills. The plant employed 8,500 workers in 1941. With the shortage of men caused by the war effort, more than half of the workers were women. President Franklin D. Roosevelt had issued an executive order forbidding racial discrimination in defense industries and the plant employed nearly 1,000 African Americans as well as Native Americans. Camp Savage was selected to become the Army's Japanese Language School for the Pacific theater. The school was first established in San Francisco, but moved to Minnesota after the bombing of Pearl Harbor made Japanese Americans unwelcome on the coast. Fort Snelling was a major recruit reception center after the Selective Service Act passed in 1940, processing over 300,000 individuals during the World War II years.

Between 70 and 75% of the iron needed to fight the war came from Minnesota's iron ore. Hormel produced more than 150 million pounds of Spam for the War Department. Ancel Keys at the University of Minnesota is credited with creating K-rations. Honeywell developed and fabricated aviation control systems, nautical periscopes, and a proximity fuse for anti-aircraft shells.

During the war Minnesota had multiple prisoner of war camps, all satellites of the 10,000-person POW Camp at Algona, Iowa. Despite some friction from unions, because of a labor shortage, German war prisoners worked in the lumber, agriculture, and food processing industries, especially commercial canning.

=== Korean War ===
The Minnesota Korean War Memorial in Saint Paul

The Korean War began on June 25, 1950 when the Korean People's Army invaded South Korea by crossing the 38th Parallel. In response, the United States, along with the United Nations Forces supported the South Korean government. During the Korean War the Military Selective Service Act was passed in 1951 which met qualifications for a national draft. During the war reserve forces of the Army were mobilized and trained stateside, one such unit to be mobilized during the conflict was the 47th Infantry Division which was primarily composed of personnel from Minnesota. The Company C of the 135th Infantry Regiment of the 47th Infantry Division took part in nuclear weapons testing operations near Lometa, Texas in March 1952 nicknamed Operation Longhorn, alongside the 1st Armored Division, the 31st Infantry Division, and the 82nd Airborne Division. According to the journal The Greybeards, the official publication of the Korean War Veterans Association, roughly 94,646 Minnesotans served in the Korean War, of which 738 were killed in action, 154 were missing in action, and 30 were prisoners of war. A list of the 738 Minnesotans who were killed during the war are each listed at the Minnesota Korean War Veterans Memorial in Saint Paul. Several Minnesotans served with distinction during the war including John U. D. Page and Royce Williams who both received the Medal of Honor.

=== Vietnam War and Indochina Wars ===
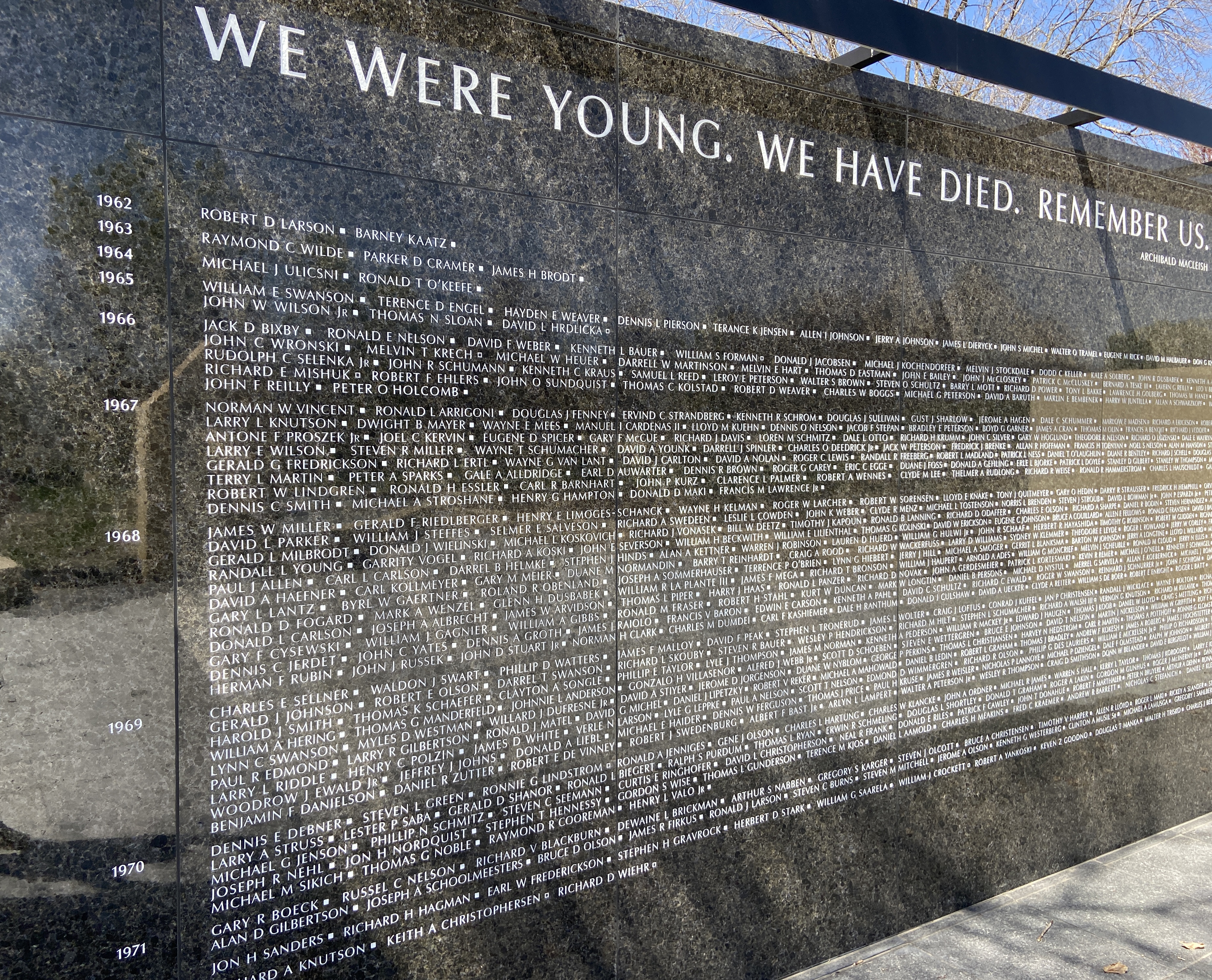
The Minnesota Vietnam Veterans Memorial near the Minnesota State Capitol

During the Vietnam War Minnesota contributed a significant number of personnel towards the war effort. According to the Minnesota Military & Veterans Museum, Minnesota contributed more than 68,000 servicemembers during the course of the conflict. A significant majority of Minnesotans who entered service through the Army were sent to either the 4th Infantry Division or the 25th Infantry Division. Certain Minnesotans distinguished themselves during the war including John William Vessey Jr., who protected the artillery fire support base at the Battle of Suoi Tre, for his actions he was awarded the Distinguished Service Cross. Other Minnesotans including Leo K. Thorsness, Kenneth L. Olson, Robert J. Pruden, and Dale Eugene Wayrynen were each awarded America's highest military decoration, the Medal of Honor.

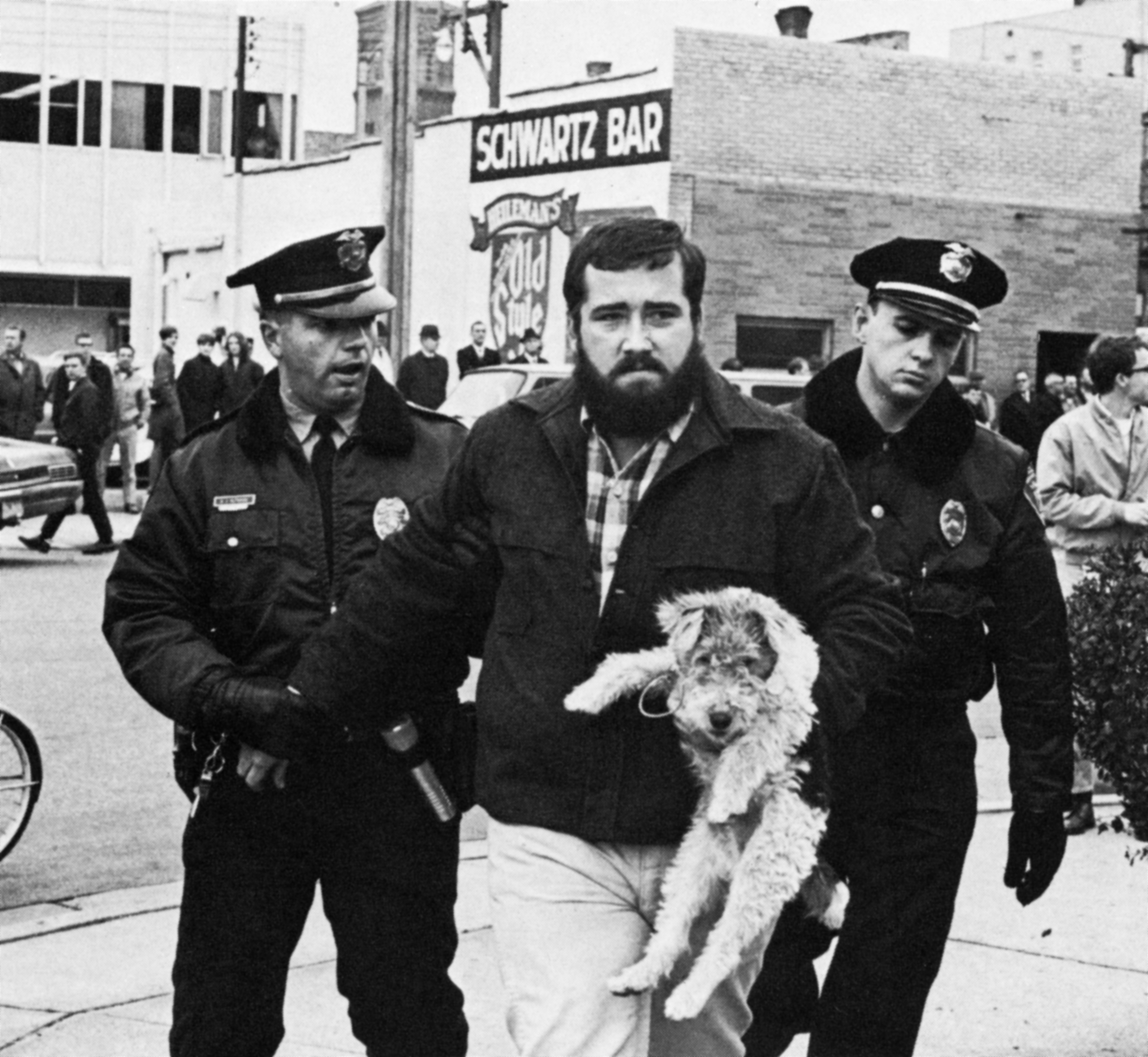
Protestor Doug Erickson is led away by police during a protest against the Vietnam War at the Stearns County Courthouse in St. Cloud, Minnesota on November 14, 1968

Minnesota, like the rest of the United States at the time, had several large protests in opposition to United States involvement in the Vietnam War. Anti-war demonstrators and students protested at many universities around the state including the University of Minnesota and Macalester College. Certain Minnesota politicians, such as Eugene McCarthy and Walter Mondale, also expressed opposition to America's involvement in the war.

Following the Laotian Civil War, a spillover of the Third Indochina War and the broader Indochina wars, many Hmong people sought refuge in the United States as part of the broader Indochina refugee crisis, many of which came to Minnesota. The Kingdom of Laos and the Hmong people were allies of the United States during the Laotian Civil War. Fighting in the war relied heavily on the Royal Lao Army which was heavily backed by the Central Intelligence Agency. When the United States withdrew from the conflict in 1973 as part of Operation Black Lion V, the Hmong quickly faced persecution and reprisals from both the Pathet Lao and the People's Army of Vietnam. Many Hmong people fled Laos following the war, many of which ended up in Thailand, others sought protection by non-governmental organizations including the United Nations High Commissioner for Refugees, the International Organization for Migration, and the International Rescue Committee among others. The first wave of Hmong refugees to Minnesota began in November 1975, the second wave came later in 1980 due in part to the Refugee Act of 1980. According to the 2010 United States census more than 260,000 Hmong Americans live in the United States, 66,000 of which are located in the Twin Cities. As of 2026 there has been a recent push amongst Hmong veterans in Minnesota for recognition in their role in Special Guerilla Units (SGUs) during Operation Momentum.

Several memorials exist across Minnesota which are dedicated to the Vietnam War, the states' primary memorial is the Minnesota Vietnam Veterans Memorial. The Minnesota Vietnam Veterans Memorial was dedicated on September 26, 1992 in Saint Paul. The memorial lists the names of 58,318 servicemembers from Minnesota, 1,120 of which were either killed in action, missing in action, or did not return from the war.

== Economic and social development ==
=== Immigration ===
Immigration to Minnesota began after the 1851 Treaty of Traverse des Sioux opened the land for white settlement in a land grab described as "pell mell". In the 1850s, settlers moving onto Minnesota lands formerly inhabited by Native Americans created a population explosion of 2,831% (by far the nation's fastest). Initially the territory was hungry for immigrants, and in 1855 the Minnesota Territory hired an emigration commissioner to attract immigrants in New York. Of the estimated 47 million immigrants who reached the U.S. between 1820 and 1975, about one million came to or through Minnesota. The French came in 1860, and were followed by the Irish and Swiss. The next wave, starting about 1875, brought British, French and French Canadians, Germans, and Norwegians. Danes and Swedes followed beginning in about 1880. Poles came after about 1895. Just before 1900, Hungarians and Dutch arrived. Belgians and Finns followed, and around 1910, Greeks and Italians began to come. By the late 1800s, 37% of Minnesotans were foreign-born; by 1920, that had dropped to 20%, and by 2017, to 8.2% (448,397 residents).

Intolerance and discrimination began to take hold. The 1921 Emergency Quota Act restricted immigration to the US. Citizens formed night schools on the Iron Range to teach Americanization. The practice spread and an Americanization council was formed in 1920. The Ku Klux Klan reemerged around 1921, taking political action against Jews, Catholics, and people of color, and advocating that the true American was the white Protestant. The Klan attracted women and families through everyday events like church suppers and weddings, and hosted annual parades in Owatonna, but lost steam in the state after about five years.

Legislation made immigration possible again. In 1948 Minnesota passed the Displaced Persons Act and welcomed Latvians and Estonians after World War II. In 1975, the state accepted Vietnamese and other Southeast Asians. When the US passed the Refugee Assistance Act in 1975, federal funds became available to local social service agencies, and Southeast Asians were directed primarily to Minnesota and California. The largest groups of foreign-born residents in Minnesota in 2018 were born in Mexico, Somalia, and India. In 2020, the Twin Cities had the largest Hmong population of any US metropolitan area. In 2019, the Somali diaspora in Minneapolis was the largest anywhere, comprising 1.5% of Minnesotans.

=== Farming and railroads ===
After the Civil War, Minnesota attracted European immigration and farmland settlers. Minnesota's population in 1870 was 439,000; this number tripled during the two subsequent decades. The Homestead Act in 1862 facilitated land claims by settlers, who regarded the land as being cheap and fertile. The railroad industry, led by the Northern Pacific Railway and Saint Paul and Pacific Railroad, advertised opportunities in the state and worked to attract immigrants. James J. Hill was instrumental in reorganizing the Saint Paul and Pacific Railroad and extending lines from the Minneapolis-Saint Paul area into the Red River Valley and to Winnipeg. He was also responsible for building a passenger depot in Minneapolis, served by the Stone Arch Bridge which was completed in 1883. Other railroads, such as the Lake Superior and Mississippi Railroad and the Milwaukee Road, also played an important role in the early days of Minnesota's statehood. Later railways, such as the Soo Line and Minneapolis and St. Louis Railway facilitated the transport of flour and other products, although they were not as involved in attracting settlers.

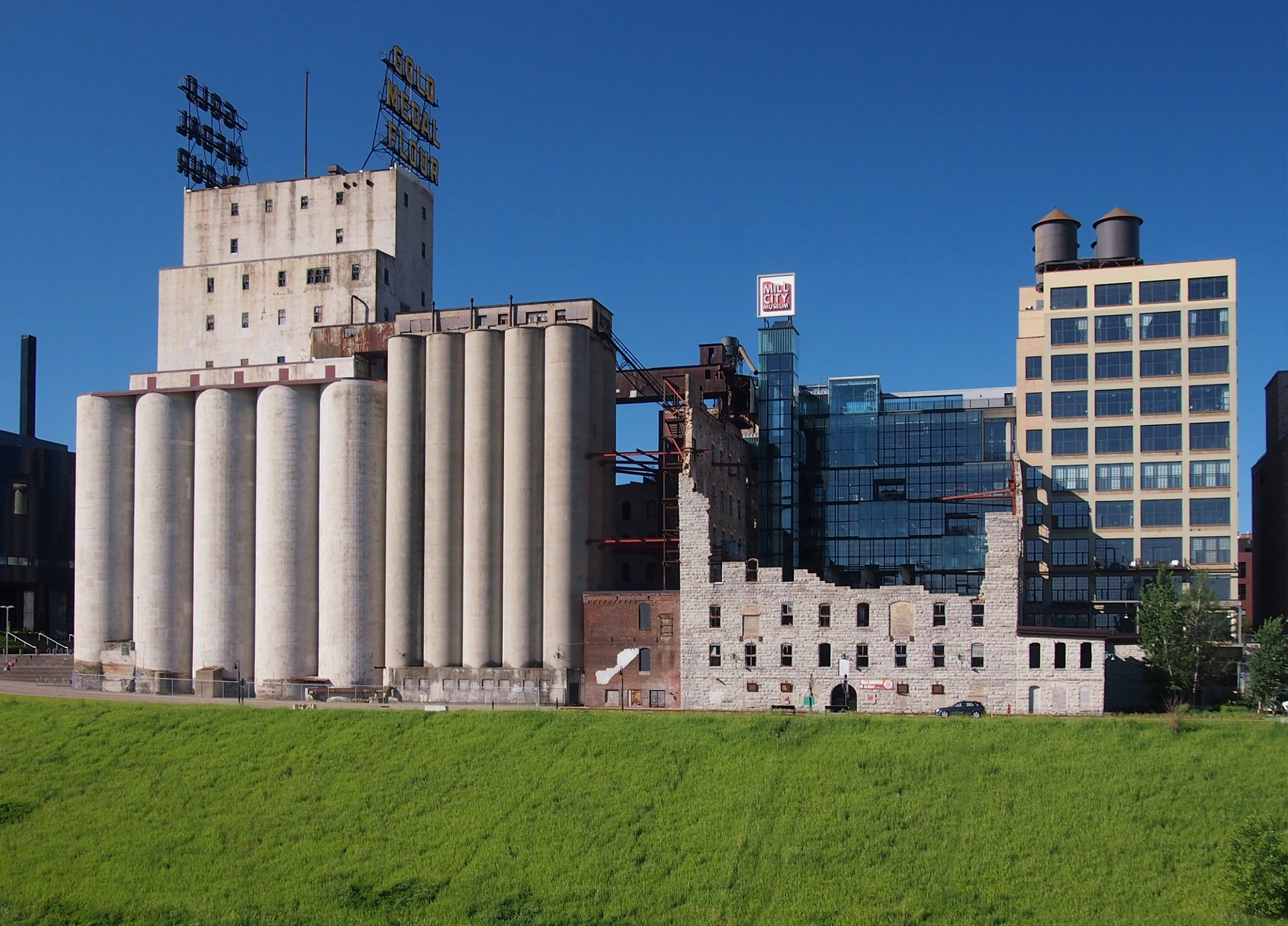
The Washburn "A" Mill Complex, which now contains a milling museum on the Mississippi River

Oliver Hudson Kelley played an important role in farming as one of the founders of the National Grange. The organization worked to provide education and advocacy on matters important to farmers. An area of concern was the freight rates charged by the railroads and by the grain elevators. Since there was little or no competition between railroads serving Minnesota farm communities, railroads could charge as much as the traffic would bear. By 1871, the situation was so heated that both the Republican and Democratic candidates in state elections promised to regulate railroad rates. The state established an office of railroad commissioner and imposed maximum charges for shipping. Populist Ignatius L. Donnelly also served the Grange as an organizer.

Saint Anthony Falls played an important part in the development of Minneapolis. The power of the waterfall first fueled sawmills, but later it was tapped to serve flour mills. In 1870, only a small number of flour mills were in the Minneapolis area, but by 1900 Minnesota mills were grinding 14.1% of the nation's grain. Advances in transportation, milling technology, and water power combined to give Minneapolis dominance in the milling industry. Spring wheat could be sown in the spring and harvested in late summer, but it posed special problems for milling. To get around these problems, Minneapolis millers invented the middlings purifier, a device that used jets of air to remove the husks from the flour early in the milling process. They also started using roller mills, as opposed to grindstones. A series of rollers gradually broke down the kernels and integrated the gluten with the starch. These improvements led to the production of "patent" flour, which commanded almost double the price of "bakers" or "clear" flour, which it replaced. Pillsbury and the Washburn-Crosby Company (a forerunner of General Mills) became the leaders in the Minneapolis milling industry. This leadership in milling later declined as milling was no longer dependent on water power, but the dominance of the mills contributed greatly to the economy of Minneapolis and Minnesota, attracting people and money to the region.

=== Industrial development ===
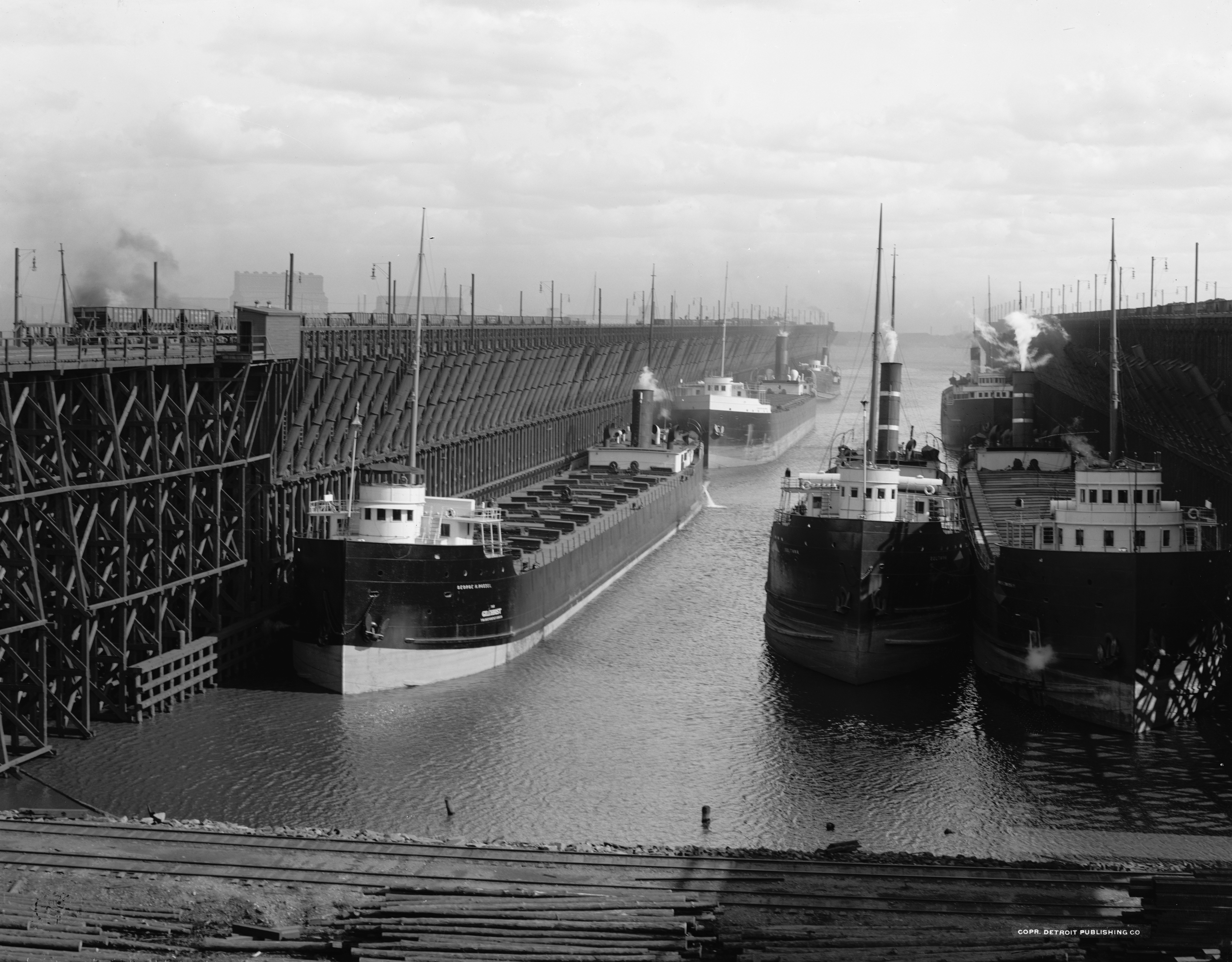
Duluth, Missabe and Iron Range Railway ore docks loading ships, circa 1900–1915.

At the end of the 19th century, several forms of industrial development shaped Minnesota. In 1882, a hydroelectric power plant was built at Saint Anthony Falls, marking one of the first developments of hydroelectric power in the United States. Iron mining began in northern Minnesota with the opening of the Soudan Mine in 1884. The Vermilion Range was surveyed and mapped by a party financed by Charlemagne Tower. Another mining town, Ely began with the foundation of the Chandler Mine in 1888. Soon after, ore was found just under the surface of the ground in Mountain Iron in the Mesabi Range. Ore in the Mesabi Range was easier to extract because it was closer to the surface, and 111 open-pit mines were operating there by 1904. To ship the iron ore to refineries, railroads such as the Duluth, Missabe and Iron Range Railway were built from the iron ranges to Two Harbors and Duluth on Lake Superior. Large ore docks were used at these cities to load the iron ore onto ships for transport east on the Great Lakes. The mining industry helped to propel Duluth from a small town to a large, thriving city. In 1904, iron was discovered in the Cuyuna Range in Crow Wing County. Between 1904 and 1984, when mining ceased there, more than 106 million tons of ore were mined.

=== Urbanization and government ===
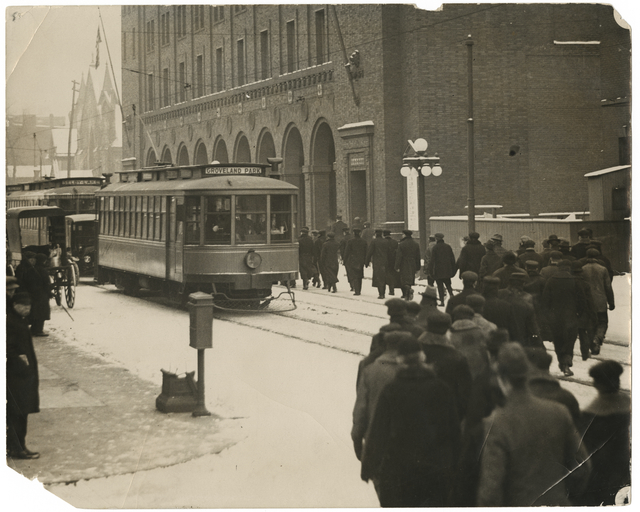
1917 Street Railway Company strike

As a result of industrialization, the population became more concentrated in urban areas. By 1900, the Twin Cities were becoming a center of commerce, led by the Minneapolis Grain Exchange. Many of the businessmen who had made money in the railroad, flour milling, and logging industries started to donate money to cultural institutions such as the Minneapolis Symphony Orchestra (now the Minnesota Orchestra). The parks of Minneapolis, under the direction of Theodore Wirth became famous, and the new Minnesota State Capitol building and the Cathedral of Saint Paul attracted attention to Saint Paul.

The role of government grew during the early 20th century. In the rural areas, most people obtained food and manufactured goods from neighbors and other people they knew personally. As industry and commerce grew, goods such as food, materials, and medicines were no longer made by neighbors, but by large companies. In response, citizens called on their government for consumer protection, inspection of goods, and regulation of public utilities. The growth of the automobile spurred calls to develop roads and to enforce traffic laws. New regulations were necessary for commerce and safety, and for banking and insurance. Since government was getting more complex, citizens demanded more of a role in their government, and became more politically active.

=== Temperance and Prohibition ===
In 1852, voters in Minnesota Territory passed a prohibition law, however it never materialized because of opposition from territorial supreme court justice Henry Z. Hayner. Local option law in Minnesota was passed in 1870, allowing individual municipalities to ban alcohol sales and liquor licenses. According to the Anti-Saloon League, by 1912 half of Minnesota villages were dry, and four-fifths of Minnesota cities were dry. In March 1915, Governor Winfield Scott Hammond passed a county option law, allowing counties to decide the status of alcohol sales. Eight counties (Becker, Cass, Hubbard, Mahnomen, Isanti, Kandiyohi, Kittson, and Norman) were already dry due to restrictions on alcohol sales in Indian Reservations and existing municipality bans. Kanabec, Lyon, Chisago, Isanti, and Lac qui Parle quickly voted to ban sales countywide. Two county option votes, in Pipestone and Meeker Counties, were contested and went to the Minnesota Supreme Court. They were ruled dry and wet counties, respectively.

After the 21st amendment to the U.S. Constitution was passed in 1933, Minnesota voters selected 21 delegates to voice their opinions at a state convention on prohibition. In October, the delegates approved the amendment. In January 1934, Governor Floyd B. Olson signed a bill to restrict alcohol sales to those of restaurants and municipal stores; it also disallowed Sunday sales and stated that counties against the 21st amendment could not manufacture or sell alcohol. After the bill was passed, counties could either repeal their dry status through a full repeal or legalizing municipal liquor stores. In May 1965, Governor Karl Rolvaag repealed county option, preventing counties from remaining dry.

=== Health ===
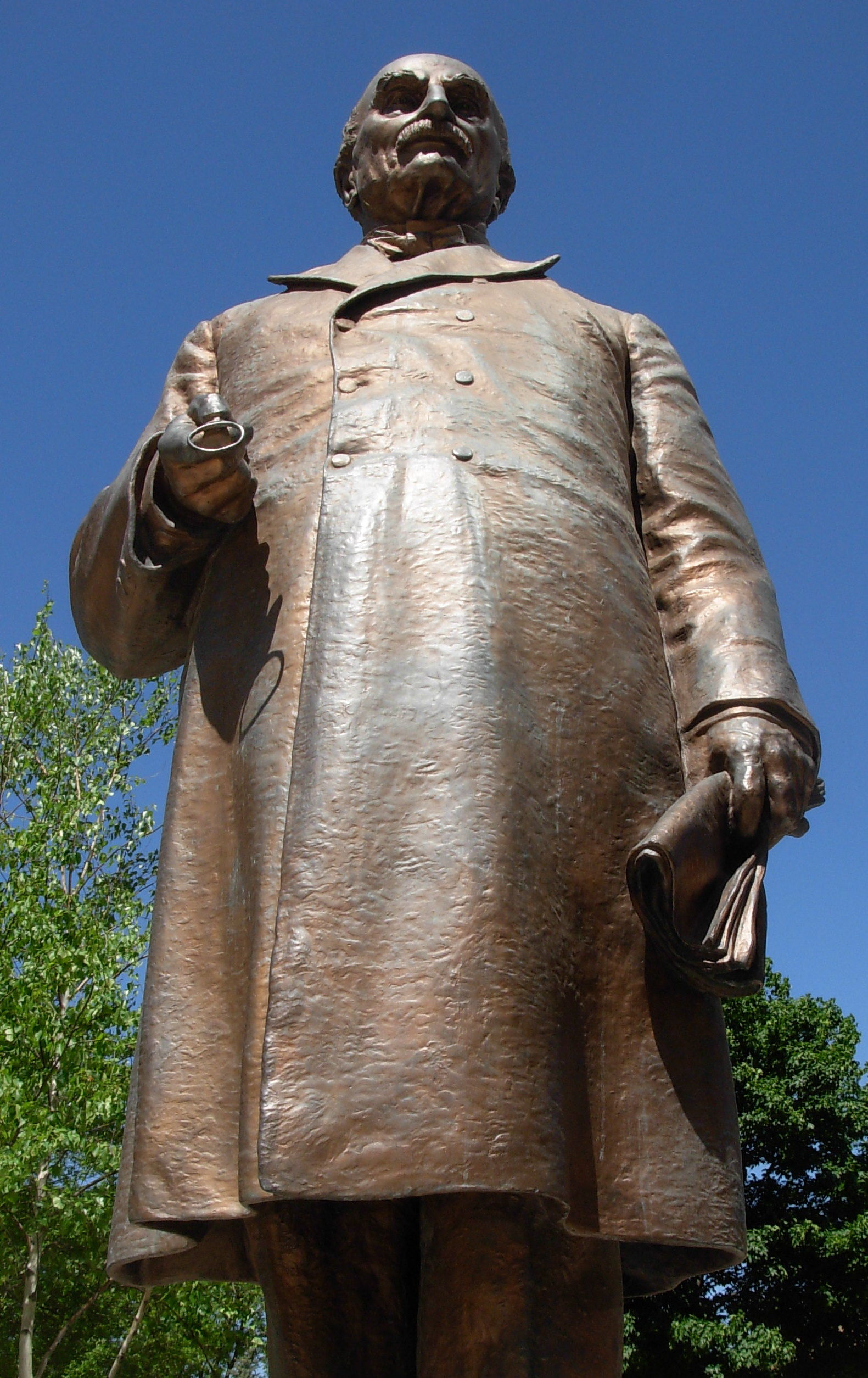
Statue of William Worrall Mayo, M.D. near the Mayo Clinic in Rochester

William Worrall Mayo, M.D. the founder of the Mayo Clinic, moved to Rochester in 1863. In the summer of 1883, an F5 tornado struck, dubbed the 1883 Rochester tornado, causing a substantial number of deaths and injuries. W. W. Mayo worked with nuns from the Sisters of St. Francis to treat the survivors. After the disaster, Mother Alfred Moes and Mayo recognized the need for a hospital and joined to build Saint Marys Hospital which opened in 1889. The hospital, with over 1,100 beds, is now part of the Mayo Clinic, which grew out of the practice of William Worrall Mayo and his sons, William James Mayo (1861–1939) and Charles Horace Mayo.

Norman Risjord writes in A Popular History of Minnesota that Mayo was a "pioneer in the concept of integrated group practice of medicine" and is "one of the premier medical facilities in the world", with more than 40,000 employees including 2,000 physicians, by the beginning of the 21st century. U.S. News & World Report's 2021 survey placed the Mayo Clinic first on the best hospitals honor roll and in the top four in most fields.

Apart from Mayo, Minnesota was an average northern state in developing public health programs after 1872, when the state board of medicine was established and public health programs began to operate.

=== Great Depression ===
The Great Depression caused layoffs on the Iron Range, and a drought in the Great Plains from 1931 through 1936 further affected Minnesota. Wilbur Foshay, an owner of several utility companies, built the Foshay Tower in 1929, just before the Wall Street Crash of 1929. The tallest building in Minnesota at the time, it was a symbol of the wealth, but Foshay lost his fortune when the stock market crashed.

Elected governor in 1930, Floyd B. Olson signed a bonding bill that authorized $15 million ($290 million as of 2025) for highway construction, in an effort to provide work for the unemployed. He also signed an executive order that provided for a minimum wage of 45 cents per hour for up to 48 hours weekly, predating the Fair Labor Standards Act of 1938 that established a nationwide minimum wage. The 1933 legislative session saw a comprehensive response to the depression including a moratorium on mortgage foreclosures, a reduction in property taxes for farmers and homeowners, the state income tax, and chain store taxes, tavern reform, ratification of a child labor amendment, and a state old-age pension system.

In 1933 the Civilian Conservation Corps (CCC) was created by an executive order of President Franklin Roosevelt, to provide employment to young jobless, unmarried men, and to help their families in need. They were assigned to nature conservation projects on waterways and primarily in forestry. At least 77,000 Minnesota men enrolled in the program. CCC activity peaked in Minnesota in 1935 with a total of 18,500 enrollees in 104 camps. The CCC was structured like and set up by the US Army which had a strict segregation policy. African Americans had difficulties getting these jobs, which mainly went to Whites and to a small number of Native Americans. The Civilian Conservation Corps-Indian Division (CCC-ID) was allocated 400 positions based on Minnesota's Native American population. The Bureau of Indian Affairs administered the CCC-ID camps.

Labor unions began forcefully asserting themselves. The Minneapolis Teamsters Strike of 1934 turned ugly, with the union demanding the right to speak for all trucking employees. As a result of this strike and many others across the nation, Congress passed the National Labor Relations Act in 1935. Government programs such as the CCC and Works Progress Administration brought much-needed work projects to the state. Congress passed the Indian Reorganization Act in 1934, giving Minnesota's Ojibwa and Dakota tribes more autonomy over their own affairs.

=== Modern economy ===
Flour milling spurred the growth of banking in Minneapolis. Millers had to pay cash for wheat during the growing season, and then hold it until it was needed for flour, which required large amounts of capital. The Federal Reserve Bank of Minneapolis was founded in 1914; it serves parts of six states in the Federal Reserve System.

Agriculture evolved from an individual occupation into a major industry after World War II. Technological developments increased farm productivity with the automation of feedlots for hogs and cattle, machine milking for dairy production, and large poultry building operations. Crops became more specialized with hybridization of corn and wheat, fertilization, and mechanical equipment such as tractors and combines became the norm. University of Minnesota professor Norman Borlaug contributed to this knowledge as part of the Green Revolution. The Minnesota Valley Canning Company sold cream style corn and then peas before becoming Green Giant in 1950.

Minnesota Mining and Manufacturing Company (3M) was founded in 1902 in Two Harbors, Minnesota, and was later moved to Duluth, Saint Paul, and then Maplewood. The founders of 3M got their start by manufacturing sandpaper. Under the leadership of William L. McKnight, the company established product lines such as abrasives for wet sanding, masking tape and other adhesives, roofing granules, resins, and films.

Suburban development intensified after the war, fueled by the demand for new housing. In 1957, the Legislature created a planning commission for the Twin Cities metropolitan area, which became the Metropolitan Council in 1967.

Northwest Airlines was founded in 1926 carrying mail from the Twin Cities to Chicago. The airline, long headquartered in Eagan, merged with Delta Air Lines in October 2008 and the Northwest headquarters closed.

=== Technology ===
Engineering Research Associates, formed in Saint Paul in 1946, built massive mainframes for the still-secret National Security Agency's wartime code-breaking and Cold War intelligence needs. Minneapolis startup Control Data Corporation under executive William Norris and engineer Seymour Cray imagined the computer hardware marketplace and then filled it profitably. From his hometown in Wisconsin, Cray and his team delivered the world's fastest computer, called the first supercomputer, in the mid-60s for Control Data back in Minnesota.

Rival IBM purchased 397 acres (161 ha) of farmland in Rochester, Minnesota in 1956 for a manufacturing facility, choosing the site over others because of the absence of labor unions. Together with Livermore Labs, they assembled what was the world's fastest supercomputer between 2004 and 2008. IBM Rochester also manufactured superfast gaming chips, and the Watson that beat two human Jeopardy! champions in 2011.

At a Minneapolis campus from 1927 until the 1990s, Honeywell, experts in variable feedback-control, had a national profile in military technology. Medtronic, founded in a Minneapolis garage in 1949, is the world's largest medical device maker as of 2020.

=== Infrastructure ===
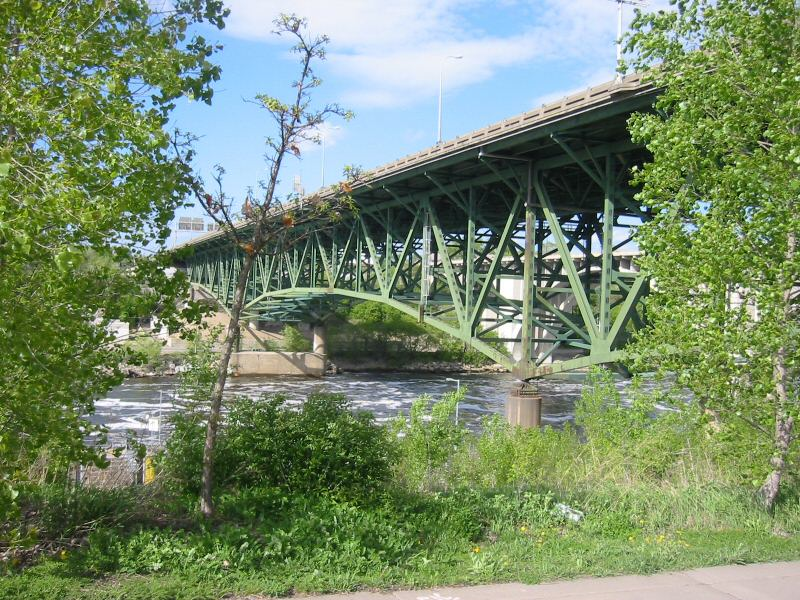
The former I-35W Mississippi River bridge before its collapse

The state officially started its trunk highway system in 1920, with the passage of the Babcock Amendment that established 70 Constitutional Routes around the state.

On August 1, 2007, the Interstate 35W Mississippi River Bridge in Minneapolis collapsed during the evening rush hour. A construction project was in progress on the bridge and nearly 300 short tons (270 t) of construction equipment and materials was positioned on the bridge. The main span of the deck truss experienced a catastrophic failure, and collapsed; 13 people died and 145 were injured. The National Transportation Safety Board investigation revealed that one of the gusset plates was insufficient. The collapse raised questions about other deficient bridges in the United States and in Minnesota. It was determined that $60.5 billion would need to be raised to keep Minnesota's road system functional. A third of Minnesota's highway bridges were more than 50 years old, and the state's pavement condition was ranked 38th in the nation.

=== Politics ===
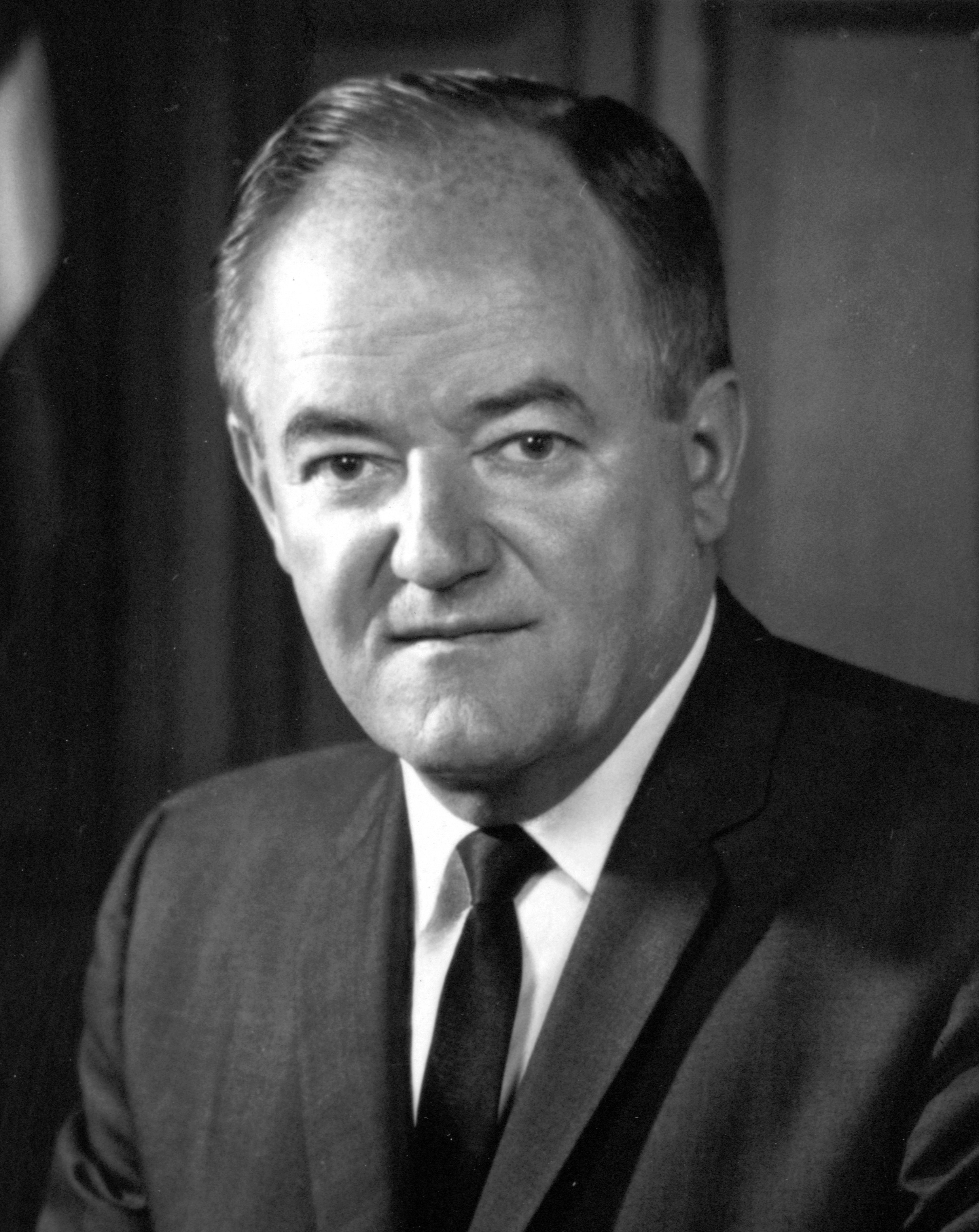
Hubert Humphrey

Hubert Humphrey was an influential Minnesota Democrat who became Minneapolis mayor (1945), U.S. senator (1948–1964, elected three times), and U.S. vice president (1965–1969). In 1944 he and others worked to merge Democrats and the Minnesota Farmer-Labor Party into the Minnesota Democratic-Farmer-Labor Party. Proposed by Humphrey, the country's first municipal fair employment law was adopted while he was mayor. The Civil Rights Act of 1964, which Humphrey called his greatest achievement, was based on ideas that Humphrey had introduced in the Senate for the previous fifteen years. Lyndon B. Johnson recruited Humphrey for his running mate in the 1964 presidential election. Humphrey's support of the Vietnam War is said to have cost him the U.S. presidency.

Eugene McCarthy (DFL) served in the United States House of Representatives from 1949 through 1959 and in the United States Senate from 1959 through 1971. In 1967, he challenged Lyndon B. Johnson for the presidential nomination, running on an anti-war platform in contrast to Johnson's policies. Democrat Walter Mondale became U.S. senator (1964–1977) to replace Humphrey and then was vice president under Jimmy Carter.

Paul Wellstone (DFL) was elected to the United States Senate in 1990, defeating incumbent Rudy Boschwitz (R) in a major upset with Boschwitz the only incumbent senator to lose reelection that year. Jesse Ventura was elected governor in 1998; he left office after one term. His election brought international attention to the Independence Party.

=== Civil rights ===
The 1791 United States Bill of Rights gave civil rights to propertied White men; race, sex, immigration, and LGBTQ discrimination have been barriers to constitutional equality. In 1868, Minnesota was the first state to grant Black men the right to vote after two failed attempts; however, true opportunities for Blacks remained illusory. The Minnesota Human Rights Act of 1967 defends thirteen "protected classes" of people in seven areas of protection.

Native American men voted and served in the Minnesota legislature between 1849 and 1862, when they had citizenship and considerable political power. Following the Dakota War, Native Americans lost their citizenship (and some, their lives) and none served again until 1933. Arcane, exclusionary language dating from the Minnesota Territory was in the state constitution until 1960.

In 1920, women earned the right to vote with the Nineteenth Amendment. Other women's rights were advanced in the Equal Rights Amendment in 1923, and while Minnesota ratified it in 1973, it did not gain support nationally. As more women entered politics, however, the state passed groundbreaking legislation in pay equity, domestic violence, and parental leave.

In 1971 Baker v. Nelson the Minnesota Supreme Court affirmed that marriage licenses are available only to persons of the opposite sex. In 2015, the US Supreme Court overruled the decision, legalizing same-sex marriage nationwide, and in 2018, Baker's marriage was explicitly recognized as valid in Minnesota. The state protects against discrimination for sexual orientation and gender identity.

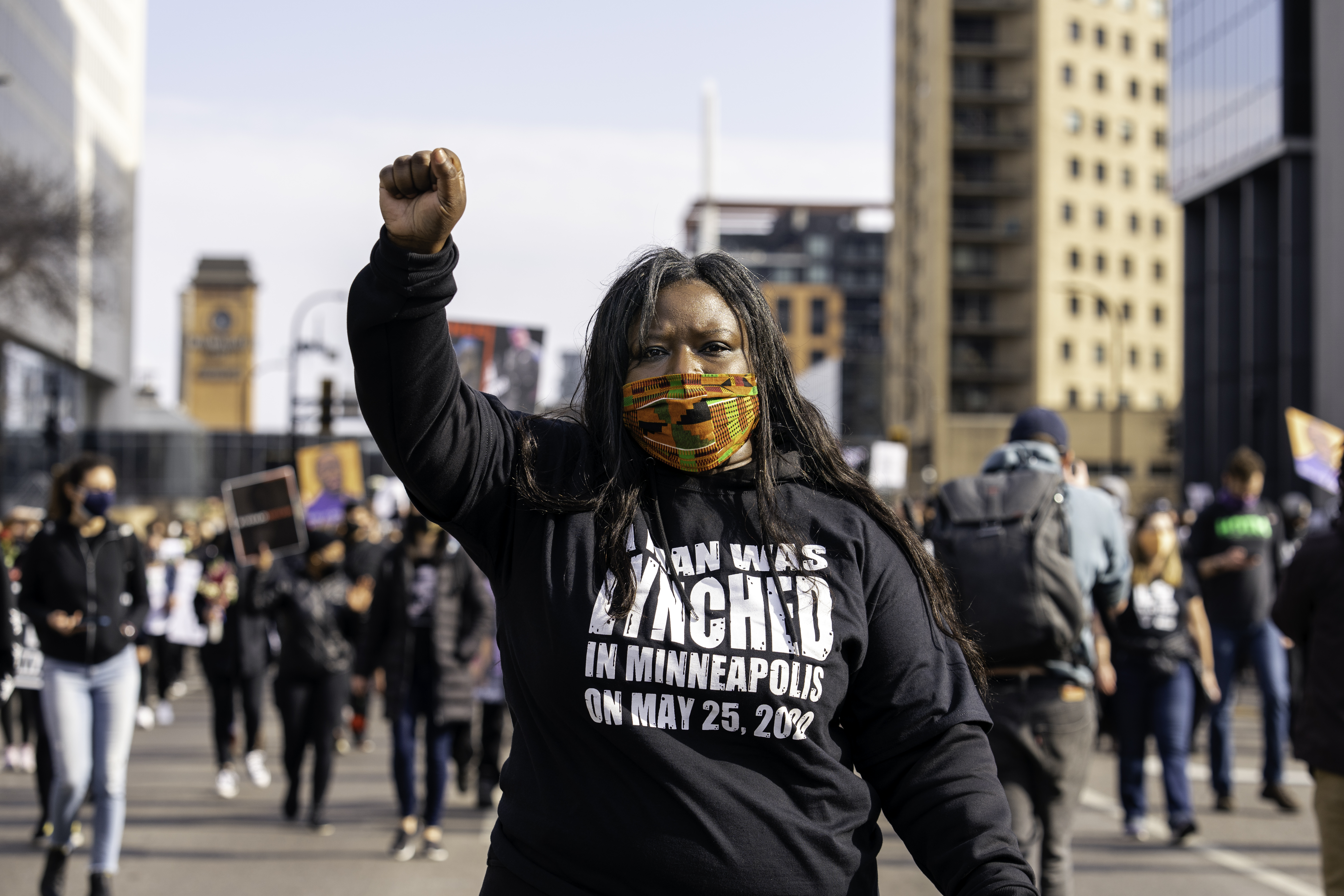
Nekima Levy Armstrong protesting against the murder of George Floyd

George Floyd, an African-American man, was arrested on May 25, 2020, by Minneapolis police officers on suspicion of passing a counterfeit $20 bill. Officer Derek Chauvin pinned Floyd to the ground and held his knee to the back of Floyd's neck for over ten minutes, while Floyd repeatedly said that he couldn't breathe. Floyd was transported to Hennepin County Medical Center and was pronounced dead. Darnella Frazier recorded the murder of George Floyd. The video quickly went viral, and large protests erupted in the Minneapolis–Saint Paul area. The protests spread to more than 150 other cities in the United States. Chauvin was found guilty of second-degree murder, third-degree murder, and second-degree manslaughter. In February 2022, three other officers on the scene were convicted of federal charges of failing to provide aid to Floyd, the first time that U.S. police officers have been tried on failing to intervene against a more senior officer who was using excessive force. Announcing her Benenson Courage Award, PEN America said, "With nothing more than a cell phone and sheer guts, Darnella changed the course of history in this country".

According to the Minnesota Historical Society, there have been 20 lynchings in Minnesota, three of which were African Americans.

Minnesota's first execution happened in St. Paul in 1860. A woman named Ann Bilansky was accused of poisoning her husband and sentenced to hang. Bilansky was the only woman hanged by the state of Minnesota, but 26 men were hanged after her. (The federal government executed the 38 Sioux men hanged during the Dakota War.) In 1906 the hanging of William Williams was botched in St. Paul, and ended up being a strangulation that took 14 minutes. Capital punishment in Minnesota was abolished in 1911.

=== Arts and culture ===
The Guthrie Theater, opened in 1963, was the brainchild of Sir Tyrone Guthrie, who wanted to found a regional theater without the commercial constraints of Broadway. His ideas were first disseminated in a 1959 article in the drama section of the New York Times, and citizens in the Minneapolis-Saint Paul area were eager to support them. The theater served as a prototype for other resident non-profit theaters.

The Minnesota Orchestra dates back to 1903 when it was founded as the Minneapolis Symphony Orchestra. It was renamed the Minnesota Orchestra in 1968 and moved into its own building, Orchestra Hall, in downtown Minneapolis in 1974. Later the Saint Paul Chamber Orchestra became the second full-time professional orchestral ensemble in the Twin Cities.

The Minneapolis Institute of Arts was established in 1883. The present building was opened in 1915. The Walker Art Center was established in 1927 as the first public art gallery in the Upper Midwest. In the 1940s, the museum shifted its focus toward modern art.

=== State and national parks ===
Minnesota's first state park, Itasca State Park, was established in 1891 at the source of the Mississippi River. By 1925, Minnesota had 23 parks. During the Depression, with nine of its parks used as housing for the Civilian Conservation Corps, a division of state parks was created to administer the park system. Modern Minnesota has 72 state parks and recreation areas, and 59 state forests, all managed by the Minnesota Department of Natural Resources.

Christopher C. Andrews, Minnesota's forestry commissioner in 1902, began to press for federally protected lands in the northern part of the state (now the Boundary Waters Canoe Area Wilderness, or BWCA, area). Superior National Forest was created from all federally owned land in northeastern Minnesota in 1909 by President Theodore Roosevelt. With sawmills shutting down and property owners falling behind on taxes during the Great Depression, the federal government purchased more land to add to the Superior National Forest. Publicity of the natural beauty of the area led to increased recreational use during the 1950s. The area was officially named the Boundary Waters Canoe Area in 1958, and the Wilderness Act of 1964 organized it as a unit of the National Wilderness Preservation System.

== See also ==
- French language in Minnesota
- Geology of Minnesota
- Glacial history of Minnesota
- List of historical societies in Minnesota
- Maritime Heritage Minnesota
- Music of Minnesota
