= Henry Meyerding =

American politician (1828–1897)

Personal details
- Born: 1828 Saint Paul, Minnesota
- Died: 1897 (aged 68–69)

Member of the Minnesota House of Representatives

Member of the U.S. House of Representatives from 's 23rd district district
- In office 1874–1875

Henry Meyerding (1828–1897) was an American politician who served as a member of the Minnesota House of Representatives from the 23rd district during the 16th Minnesota Legislative Session in 1874.

== Early life and career ==
Born in Germany, Henry Meyerding came to Minnesota in 1855 and resided in Saint Paul, Minnesota. He worked as a cabinetmaker prior to and during his term in office.

== Political career ==
Meyerding was elected to the Minnesota House of Representatives from the 23rd district on November 4, 1873. His term began on January 6, 1874, and concluded on January 4, 1875. He represented Ramsey County, Minnesota.

Meyerding served on the Committee on Education and the Committee on the Hospital for the Insane.:

== See also ==
- History of Minnesota
