= Bruentrup Heritage Farm =

Museum in Maplewood, Minnesota

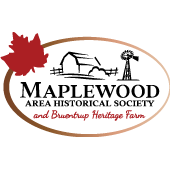

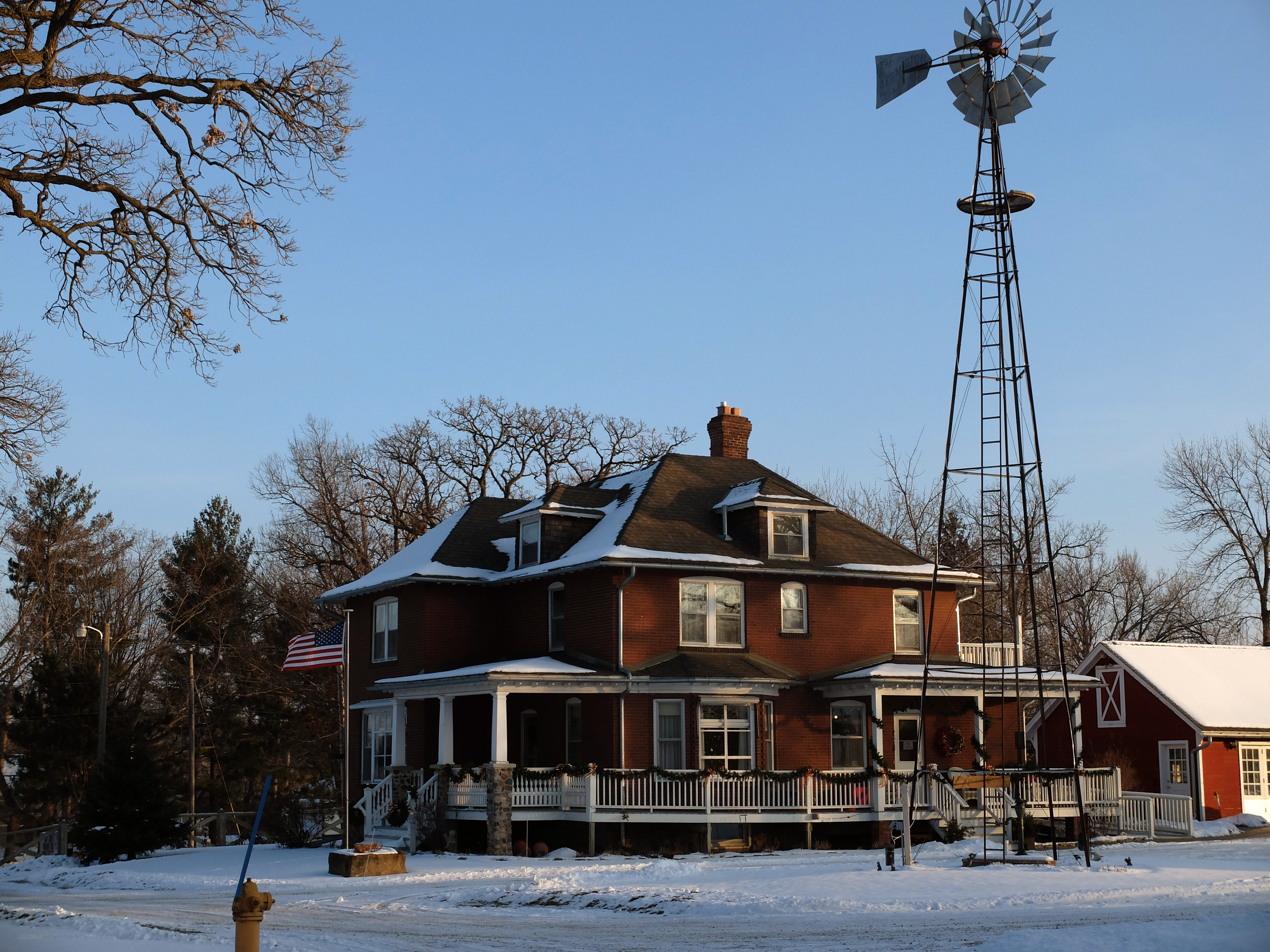
- Exterior of the Farmhouse
- Established: 1997
- Location: 2170 County Rd D E, Maplewood, Minnesota, USA
- Coordinates: 45.035095°N 93.008936°W
- Type: Local history
- Executive director: T.J. Malaskee
- Website: maplewoodmuseum.org

The Bruentrup Heritage Farm is a historic farmstead and museum located in Maplewood, Minnesota. Established in 1891, the farm was home to four generations of the Bruentrup family until 1999. Today, it is operated by the Maplewood Area Historical Society (MAHS) as a history museum.

== History of the Farm ==
William Bruentrup immigrated from Germany in 1882 and married Ida Wagner in 1891. Ida's parents gifted them 40 acres of land to start the Bruentrup Farm on White Bear Avenue. Over the years, the farm grew to 175 acres, encompassing land now occupied by Maplewood Mall. The Bruentrup family primarily operated a dairy farm.

By the late 20th century, Maplewood experienced significant development pressure. In 1997, developers purchased the land surrounding the farm, but the Bruentrup family retained ownership of the buildings. The Maplewood City Council offered 2.5 acres of land on County Road D to relocate the farmstead buildings. Through fundraising efforts with the Bruentrup family's cooperation, the MAHS successfully moved the historic structures to their current location in 1999. The is leased from the city by MAHS for 99 years, and the land is surrounded by 20 acres of public open space.

== History of the Museum ==
The MAHS was incorporated as a non-profit in 1997 to preserve and share the history of Maplewood with the Bruentrup Heritage Farm becoming a cornerstone of the society's mission, offering a unique opportunity to showcase Maplewood's agricultural past. The MAHS operates the farm as a museum and event center, hosting educational programs and events that promote an understanding of 19th and early 20th-century farm life in Minnesota.

== Collections ==
The Bruentrup Heritage Farm collection includes historic farm equipment, household items, and agricultural tools used by the Bruentrup family. The MAHS also maintains an archive of documents and photographs related to the farm's history and the Bruentrup family.

== Programs and Events ==
The Bruentrup Heritage Farm offers a variety of educational programs and events throughout the year. These include:

- Day Camps: These camps provide hands-on and experiential learning opportunities that explore history and culture.
- Big Red Barn Farmers Market: A seasonal market designed to support local agriculture and businesses, and to provide community members with access to fresh, locally sourced food.
- Special events: Presentations on state and local history, civic discussions, and an annual Snowshoe Scramble.

== See also ==
- List of museums in Minnesota
