= Antoine Auguelle =

17th-century French explorer

Antoine Auguelle Picard du Gay (alternative spelling Augelle, also referred to as Anthony Auguel) was a 17th-century French explorer. Born at Amiens in Picardy, Auguelle, along with Michel Aco, accompanied Father Louis Hennepin during his exploration of the Upper Mississippi River in what is now the United States. Setting out from Fort Crevecoeur in present-day Illinois on February 29, 1680, the trio were captured by a band of Santee Sioux on April 12, 1680, near Mille Lacs Lake in present-day Minnesota. During their captivity, they were escorted to Minnesotan landmarks such as Saint Anthony Falls, Lake Pepin, and Kaposia, and, in the process, becoming the first Europeans to do so. They were released at the end of September 1680, at the insistence of explorer Daniel Greysolon, Sieur du Lhut.
