= Minnesota African American Heritage Museum and Gallery =

Museum in Minneapolis, Minnesota

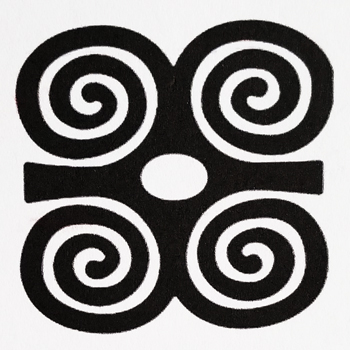
- Established: 2018
- Location: 1256 Penn Avenue N., Fourth Floor, Minneapolis, Minnesota, United States 55411
- Coordinates: 44.9991°N 93.3082°W
- Founder: Coventry Cowens, Tina Burnside
- Website: maahmg.org

The Minnesota African American Heritage Museum and Gallery (MAAHMG) is a museum and gallery dedicated to the art, history and culture of African American people in Minnesota, United States. Located in Minneapolis, the museum was founded in 2018, and offers free admission.

== Facility and founding ==
The gallery is 1,100 square feet (100 m^{2}) on the fourth floor inside the former headquarters of THOR construction companies, now known as the Regional Acceleration Center, at the intersection of Penn and Plymouth Avenues in North Minneapolis. The logo is one of the West African Adinkra symbols: for 'ram’s horns', meaning humility and strength.

Civil rights attorney/writer Tina Burnside and education administrator Coventry Cowens met in 2017, and together, in September 2018, the two founded MAAHMG as one of the state's first African American history museums.

== Exhibits ==
Rotating exhibits explore different aspects of Black history and culture in Minnesota. The exhibits can be historical in nature, showcasing important figures or events, or contemporary, featuring the work of local Black artists. The inaugural permanent exhibit, Unbreakable: Celebrating the Resilience of African Americans in Minnesota, looked at the effect of the Great Migration on Minnesota. Grace ran from November 2018 through January 2019, and showcased women's hats, sometimes called "church hats," that enslaved Black women were allowed to wear for Sunday church services.

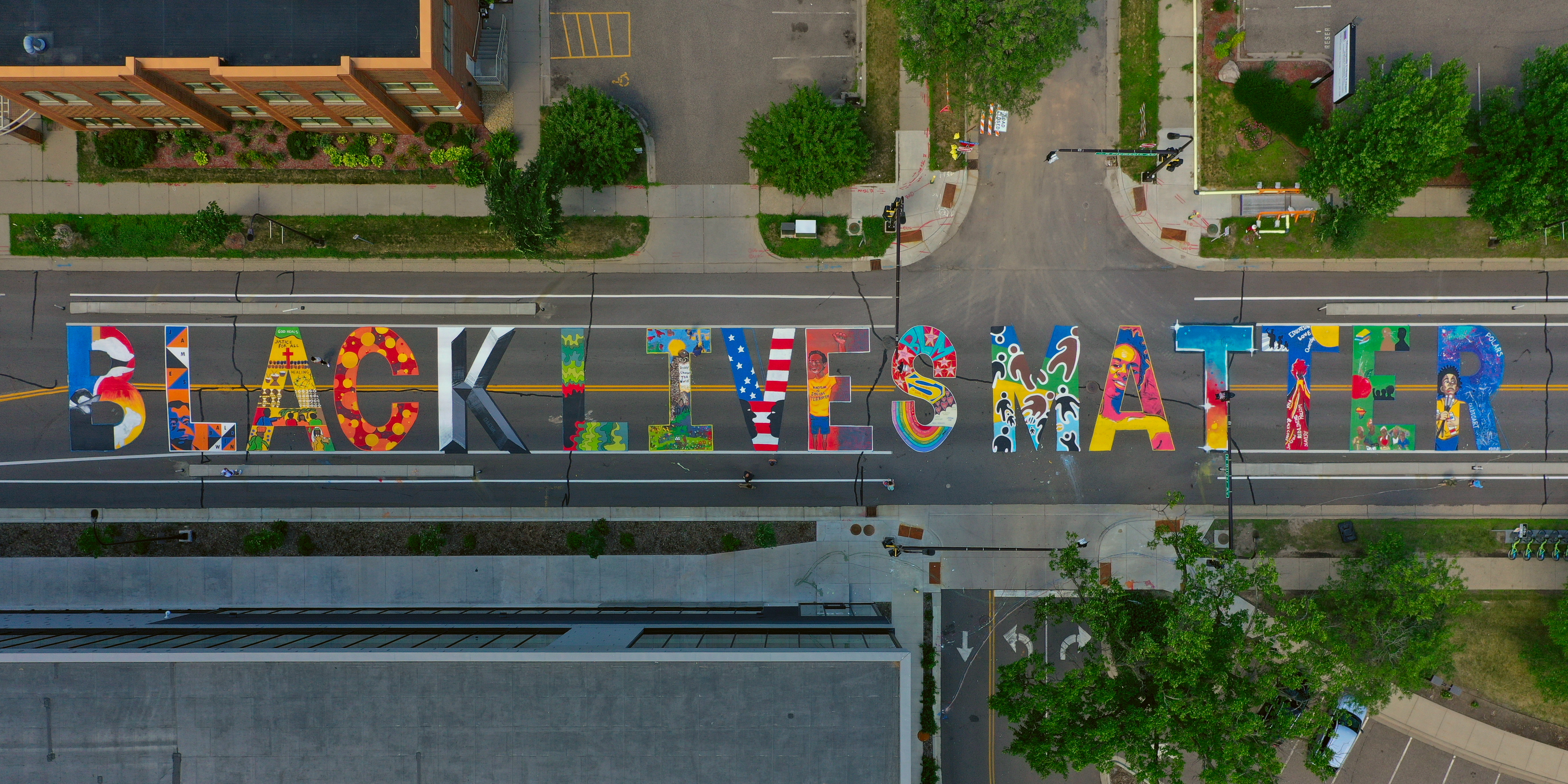
2020 BLM mural

In July 2020, the museum organized a mural along a block of Plymouth Avenue, in which "Black Lives Matter" was painted in 24-foot (7.3 m)-high letters, a different artist painting each letter. The mural was completed in support of protests for racial justice after the murder of George Floyd. From August through December 2020, the museum presented A Reckoning: 100 Years after the Lynchings in Duluth, commemorating the lynching of Elias Clayton, Elmer Jackson, and Isaac McGhie in 1920. In 2022, the museum presented Early African Americans of Southeast Minnesota by historian Mica Anders, and several public online events in February for Black History Month.

The collection includes a Green Book, which helped black travelers to find food and lodging. A black innovation exhibit features architect Clarence Wigington, and Reatha King, the former General Mills executive who earlier developed tubing for Apollo 11.

Opening on January 27, 2024, in celebration of Black History Month, the artist-in-residence exhibition "Okra and Indigo," explores the connections between African American heritage and foodways through artist Azania Tripp’s collage pieces including community portraits and furniture design.

== Programs ==
MAAHMG fulfills its mission through a variety of exhibits, workshops, and community events. These programs aim to educate and inform the public about the significant contributions, experiences, and history of African Americans in Minnesota.

=== Children's Reading Circle ===
This program promotes literacy and introduces children to African American authors and characters by having local authors, storytellers, and community members read to children.

=== Artist-in-Residence Program ===
This program provides a stipend and space for Black artists to create new work and culminate in an exhibition at the museum. The program's primary aim is to provide a platform for underrepresented Black artists in the state. It fosters artistic growth by offering resources and space for them to create new work that explores themes of Black history, art, and culture.

=== History Fellowship ===
Similar to the artist program, this fellowship offers financial support to an individual researching and developing a project related to Minnesota's Black history. The culmination of the fellowship often involves presenting the research findings to the public through an exhibition, educational program, or other suitable format.

The program aims to address two key objectives:

- Supporting Underrepresented Professionals: It seeks to cultivate a more diverse field within museums and historical institutions by providing experience and professional development opportunities for African Americans who might be underrepresented in these settings.
- Enriching Historical Scholarship: The fellowship fosters in-depth research and exploration of Minnesota's Black history, leading to the creation of new exhibitions or educational resources.

== See also ==
- List of museums in Minnesota
