= Bradbury Brook =

Coordinates: 45.9982938°N 93.659689°W

Bradbury Brook is a small stream in Central Minnesota in the United States. It is a tributary of the Rum River, which drains into the Mississippi.

It also the name of an archaeological procurement area (Smithsonian trinomial: 21ML42) located a few miles south of Mille Lacs Lake along its namesake. Late Paleoindian inhabitants gathered cobbles of siltstone from a streambed or directly from glacial drift. A partially intact stone workshop at this site was dated to 7212 +/- 75 BCE. The siltstone was used to produce a variety of tools, including a stemmed point, other bifaces, keeled scrapers, blades and chipped stone adzes. The workshop also contained several fragmented anvilstones and an abundant sample of hammerstones of various sizes.

Archaeologists working at the site found more than 125,000 artifacts, including stone tools, dating to 7212 BCE, making it the earliest dated excavated site in Minnesota.

== See also ==
- Mille Lacs County Streams
