= National Register of Historic Places listings in Carver County, Minnesota =

Location of Carver County in Minnesota

This is a list of the National Register of Historic Places listings in Carver County, Minnesota. It is intended to be a complete list of the properties and districts on the National Register of Historic Places in Carver County, Minnesota, United States. The locations of National Register properties and districts for which the latitude and longitude coordinates are included below, may be seen in an online map.

There are 35 properties and districts listed on the National Register in the county. Many structures are built of local Chaska brick, which has a distinctive cream color. A supplementary list includes four additional sites that were formerly listed on the National Register.

This National Park Service list is complete through NPS recent listings posted April 24, 2026.

== Current listings ==
	Name on the Register	Image	Date listed	Location	City or town	Description
1	Emile Amblard Guest House	Emile Amblard Guest House	January 4, 1980 (#80001982)	32–36 N. Vine St. 44°51′04″N 93°47′22″W	Waconia	Circa-1900 lodging house, the best preserved building associated with Waconia's late-19th/early-20th-century resort industry and the only surviving building designed by primary Coney Island of the West promoter Emile Amblard.
2	Brinkhaus Saloon Livery Barn	Brinkhaus Saloon Livery Barn	January 4, 1980 (#80001962)	112 W. 4th St. 44°47′15″N 93°36′07″W	Chaska	A saloon's livery stable built circa 1875, a rare and well-preserved relic of Chaska's early businesses. Now houses the Chaska Historical Society.
3	Carver Historic District	Carver Historic District	January 4, 1980 (#80001960)	Roughly bounded by Lime, 1st, Walnut, and 6th Sts. 44°45′49″N 93°37′32″W	Carver	Well-preserved core of a Minnesota River town with about 100 contributing properties mostly built 1855–1880; Carver County's greatest concentration of historically and architecturally significant buildings.
4	Chaska Historical Marker	Chaska Historical Marker	July 6, 2010 (#10000415)	County Highway 61 near Edgehill Rd. 44°46′58″N 93°36′43″W	Chaska	1938 example of the finely crafted early wayside rests developed by the Minnesota Department of Highways in National Park Service rustic style.
5	Church of St. Hubertus-Catholic	Church of St. Hubertus-Catholic	March 19, 1982 (#82002937)	Great Plains Boulevard and W. 78th St. 44°51′43″N 93°31′51″W	Chanhassen	1887 church from which a Franciscan brotherhood platted and grew the German Catholic settlement that became Chanhassen.
6	Coney Island of the West	Coney Island of the West	August 11, 1976 (#76001048)	Lake Waconia off Minnesota Highway 5; 44°51′40″N 93°47′01″W	Waconia	31-acre (13 ha) island with the ruins of hotels, cottages, and parks; one of Minnesota's most popular early resort destinations from the 1880s to the 1920s.
7	District No. 22 School	District No. 22 School	January 19, 2021 (#100006006)	17380 Homestead Rd. 44°41′20″N 93°42′21″W	San Francisco Township	Well-preserved example of a one-room schoolhouse built on a standard design, active 1917–1946. Became San Francisco Township Hall in 1961.
8	Frederick E. DuToit House	Frederick E. DuToit House	January 4, 1980 (#80001965)	121 Hickory St. 44°47′02″N 93°36′22″W	Chaska	Circa-1870 house of Frederick E. DuToit (1844–1922), newspaper publisher, politician, and a second-generation member of an influential family credited with much of Chaska's commercial growth.
9	Eder-Baer House	Eder-Baer House	January 4, 1980 (#80001966)	105 Elm St. 44°47′01″N 93°36′17″W	Chaska	Well-preserved Queen Anne house built circa 1900, the most architecturally significant building in a city that did not usually represent specific architectural styles.
10	Frederick Greiner House	Frederick Greiner House	January 4, 1980 (#80001967)	319 E. 3rd St. 44°47′14″N 93°35′49″W	Chaska	Well-preserved house built circa 1870 by a hotel proprietor also long involved in local politics, one of Chaska's earliest businessmen and public officials.
11	Wendelin Grimm Farmstead	Wendelin Grimm Farmstead	December 30, 1974 (#74001008)	Off County Highway 11 in Carver Park Reserve; 44°53′05″N 93°43′01″W	Victoria vicinity	160-acre (65 ha) farmstead with an 1876 house, where German immigrant Wendelin Grimm (1818–1890) developed the first alfalfa that could withstand North American winters. Now a Three Rivers Park District educational facility.
12	Philip Guettler House	Philip Guettler House	January 4, 1980 (#80001963)	206 Mill St. E. 44°46′07″N 93°46′50″W	Cologne	1902 house of the second-generation owner of a mill established in 1880, Cologne's earliest, largest, and longest-running industry.
13	J. Carsten and Magaretha Harms Farmhouse	J. Carsten and Magaretha Harms Farmhouse	December 18, 2013 (#13000931)	1110 Cty. Rd. 152; 44°45′01″N 93°48′23″W	Cologne vicinity	1878 farmhouse whose history and Chaska brick architecture represent German immigrant settlement of the upper Minnesota River Valley.
14	Jacob Hebeisen Hardware Store	Jacob Hebeisen Hardware Store	January 4, 1980 (#80001975)	Railroad and Maria Sts. 44°43′59″N 93°58′03″W	Hamburg	1907 building housing a hardware store that became a consumer cooperative in 1919, illustrating a significant movement in Minnesota that led to advances in agriculture, commerce, milling, and mining, and set the stage for the development of labor unions.
15	Albertine and Fred Heck House	Albertine and Fred Heck House	December 27, 2000 (#00001508)	8941 Audubon Rd. 44°50′33″N 93°33′54″W	Chanhassen	Farmhouse built circa 1895 of Chaska brick, representing a major local industry that produced distinctive cream-colored bricks which saw wide commercial and utilitarian use but only appear in houses in the immediate area.
16	Herald Block	Herald Block	January 4, 1980 (#80001968)	123 W. 2nd St. 44°47′06″N 93°36′05″W	Chaska	1871 newspaper office and the adjacent building it later expanded into, the long-serving home of the Chaska Herald published by the locally influential DuToit family.
17	King Oscar's Settlement	King Oscar's Settlement	January 4, 1980 (#80001974)	County Highway 40; 44°43′45″N 93°40′30″W	Carver vicinity	Well-preserved religious complex of Carver County's first Swedish American settlement, later known as East Union, with an 1865 caretaker's cottage, 1866 church, 1874 parsonage, park, cemetery, and a parish hall out of which grew Gustavus Adolphus College.
18	John Knotz House	John Knotz House	January 4, 1980 (#80001970)	302 Paul Ave. S. 44°46′06″N 93°46′52″W	Cologne	1905 house and carriage house of John Knotz, a long-serving doctor employed by the railroads, and his wife Rosa Partoll Knotz, an early local women's rights advocate who served three terms as Cologne's mayor in the 1920s.
19	Laketown Moravian Brethren's Church	Laketown Moravian Brethren's Church	January 4, 1980 (#80001981)	7460 Victoria Dr. 44°52′08″N 93°40′39″W	Victoria	1878 church, a well-preserved example of rural vernacular religious architecture, marking a transition between the spartan frame designs of Carver County's earliest churches and its elaborate later churches of brick.
20	E. H. Lewis House	E. H. Lewis House	January 4, 1980 (#80001971)	321 W. 2nd St. 44°47′04″N 93°36′15″W	Chaska	Circa-1870 house with well-preserved design features, owned successively by the Faber family (responsible for many of Chaska's commercial endeavors) and prominent local doctor E.H. Lewis.
21	Charles Maiser House	Charles Maiser House	January 4, 1980 (#80001983)	16 W. Main St. 44°51′02″N 93°47′12″W	Waconia	Circa-1875 house inhabited by an owner of a mill that operated 1884–1967, a prominent architectural presence on Waconia's main street and a symbol of its important milling industry.
22	Mock Cigar Factory and House	Mock Cigar Factory and House	January 4, 1980 (#80001984)	48 W. Main St. 44°51′02″N 93°47′14″W	Waconia	Circa-1875 cigar factory and adjacent owner's house, a prominent architectural presence on Waconia's main street and the best-preserved buildings associated with its early industries.
23	Paul Mohrbacher House	Paul Mohrbacher House	January 4, 1980 (#80001972)	102 Paul Ave. S. 44°46′12″N 93°46′52″W	Cologne	Locally prominent house built circa 1880 by town founder and civic leader Paul Mohrbacher, who maintained a lifelong involvement in Cologne's commerce and industry.
24	Norwood Methodist Episcopal Church	Norwood Methodist Episcopal Church	January 4, 1980 (#80001978)	224 Hill St. E. 44°46′13″N 93°55′41″W	Norwood Young America	1876 church noted for its distinctive architectural embellishments and connection to town founder James Slocum, Jr., who financed and built it.
25	Andrew Peterson Farmstead	Andrew Peterson Farmstead	October 11, 1979 (#79003713)	8060 Minnesota Highway 5; 44°51′51″N 93°43′31″W	Waconia vicinity	Farmstead with five structures associated with Swedish immigrant Andrew Peterson (1818–1898), whose 43-year diary posthumously became a major inspiration for The Emigrants novels by author Vilhelm Moberg in the 1940s and 50s.
26	Johann Schimmelpfennig Farmstead	Johann Schimmelpfennig Farmstead	January 4, 1980 (#80001980)	Off U.S. Route 212; 44°46′39″N 93°52′40″W	Norwood Young America vicinity	Farmstead significant for retaining structures that illustrate the typical development of Carver County farms, with three 1856 log buildings from the subsistence agriculture period, an 1870s farmhouse expansion due to growing fortunes, and a 1909 barn from a shift to livestock and dairy farming.
27	Simons Building and Livery Barn	Simons Building and Livery Barn	January 4, 1980 (#80001964)	123 W. 3rd St. 44°47′09″N 93°36′07″W	Chaska	1888 saloon/hotel (expanded with living quarters in the 1890s) and adjacent livery stable, some of Chaska's best surviving examples of early commercial architecture and 1880s commercial/residential buildings.
28	Tukihasaŋ Oyaŋke/Winter Shell Site	Tukihasaŋ Oyaŋke/Winter Shell Site	August 20, 2025 (#100012156)	Address restricted	San Francisco Township	Minnesota's first extensively studied shell midden, providing key insights into resource acquisition and processing during the late Woodland period in the region.
29	Waconia City Hall	Waconia City Hall	May 9, 1983 (#83000900)	9 W. 1st St. 44°50′57″N 93°47′12″W	Waconia	1909 multipurpose municipal building that housed Waconia's government offices, fire department, library, senior center, and meeting hall; noted as a center of community activity and for its locally unique architecture.
30	Walnut Street Historic District	Walnut Street Historic District	January 4, 1980 (#80001973)	Roughly around Walnut, 2nd, Chestnut, and 6th Sts. 44°47′12″N 93°35′57″W	Chaska	Concentration of well-preserved structures ranging from Native American burial mounds to commercial, industrial, residential, and religious buildings, reflecting Chaska's past from prehistory to 1920.
31	West Main Street Houses	West Main Street Houses	January 4, 1980 (#80001986)	417, 429, and 453 W. Main St. 44°51′01″N 93°47′35″W	Waconia	Three houses built in 1896, 1898, and 1903; well-preserved examples of 19th-century residential design produced by local craftsmen.
32	West Union	West Union	January 4, 1980 (#80001987)	15820 Market Ave. 44°42′59″N 93°46′09″W	Cologne vicinity	Religious complex of Carver County's first Swedish American settlement, with an 1868 church and freestanding 1905 parish hall featuring elements of rural Swedish parochial architecture.
33	Winter Saloon	Winter Saloon	January 4, 1980 (#80001979)	227 Elm St. 44°46′04″N 93°55′40″W	Norwood Young America	Circa-1890 saloon with attached living quarters, Norwood's oldest and best preserved drinking establishment and a prominent feature of its downtown.
34	Young America City Hall	Young America City Hall	January 4, 1980 (#80001988)	102 2nd Ave. S. 44°46′55″N 93°54′48″W	Norwood Young America	1909 city hall, the best preserved example of Carver County's monumental early municipal buildings and a prominent Young America landmark long host to its city government. Now a private residence.
35	Zoar Moravian Church	Zoar Moravian Church	January 4, 1980 (#80001985)	8265 County Highway 10; 44°49′07″N 93°43′51″W	Waconia vicinity	Largely unaltered 1863 church, the only surviving example of three built by Carver County's early Moravian Church adherents.

== Former listings ==
	Name on the Register	Image	Date listed	Date removed	Location	City or town	Description
1	Chanhassen Township Hall	Chanhassen Township Hall	January 4, 1980 (#80001961)	March 28, 1990	Great Plains Blvd. (original address); Current coordinates are 44°51′42″N 93°31′52″W	Chanhassen	1890 municipal hall. Moved in 1988.
2	Jacob Hebeisen House	Jacob Hebeisen House	January 4, 1980 (#80001976)	November 1, 2018	Off County Highway 50	Hamburg	1884 house expanded in 1900, noted for its local architectural prominence and association with a leading merchant. Demolished in 2002.
3	Iltis Brewery and Ice House		January 4, 1980 (#80001969)	June 28, 1991	597 Stoughton Ave.	Chaska	Buildings of a brewery established in 1866, nominated as the last standing example of early Chaska's significant brewing industry. Fell into disrepair and demolished in 1989.
4	Kusske and Hahn Saloon	Kusske and Hahn Saloon	January 4, 1980 (#80001977)	June 4, 2001	County Highway 23; 44°53′54″N 93°53′23″W	Mayer	1870 Italianate saloon. Delisted after significant alteration.

== See also ==
- List of National Historic Landmarks in Minnesota
- National Register of Historic Places listings in Minnesota
