= David Snyder (politician) =

American politician

Personal details
- Party: Democratic
- Spouse: Susan
- Children: 1
- Education: University of Minnesota, Duluth

David Snyder is the potential U.S. Representative for Minnesota's 6th congressional district from Carver, Minnesota. The district includes most of the northern suburbs of the Twin Cities, as well as St. Cloud, Minnesota. During the 2016 election, he faced the Republican nominee, Tom Emmer. Before expressing his interest as a congressman, he was previously a helicopter pilot in the United States Army, where he attained the Chief Warrant Officer rank.

== U.S. House of Representatives ==
=== 2016 election ===
On May 22, 2016, the Minnesota Democratic–Farmer–Labor Party endorsed Snyder at the nominee for the election in Minnesota's 6th congressional district. Snyder won the initial endorsement out of defeating potential nominees Judy Adams and Bob Helland by receiving 74 out of 118 ballots. Following the announcement, Snyder raised between $16,000 and $20,000 for his campaign.
