= Winter Saloon =

Historic building in Minnesota, United States

- U.S. National Register of Historic Places
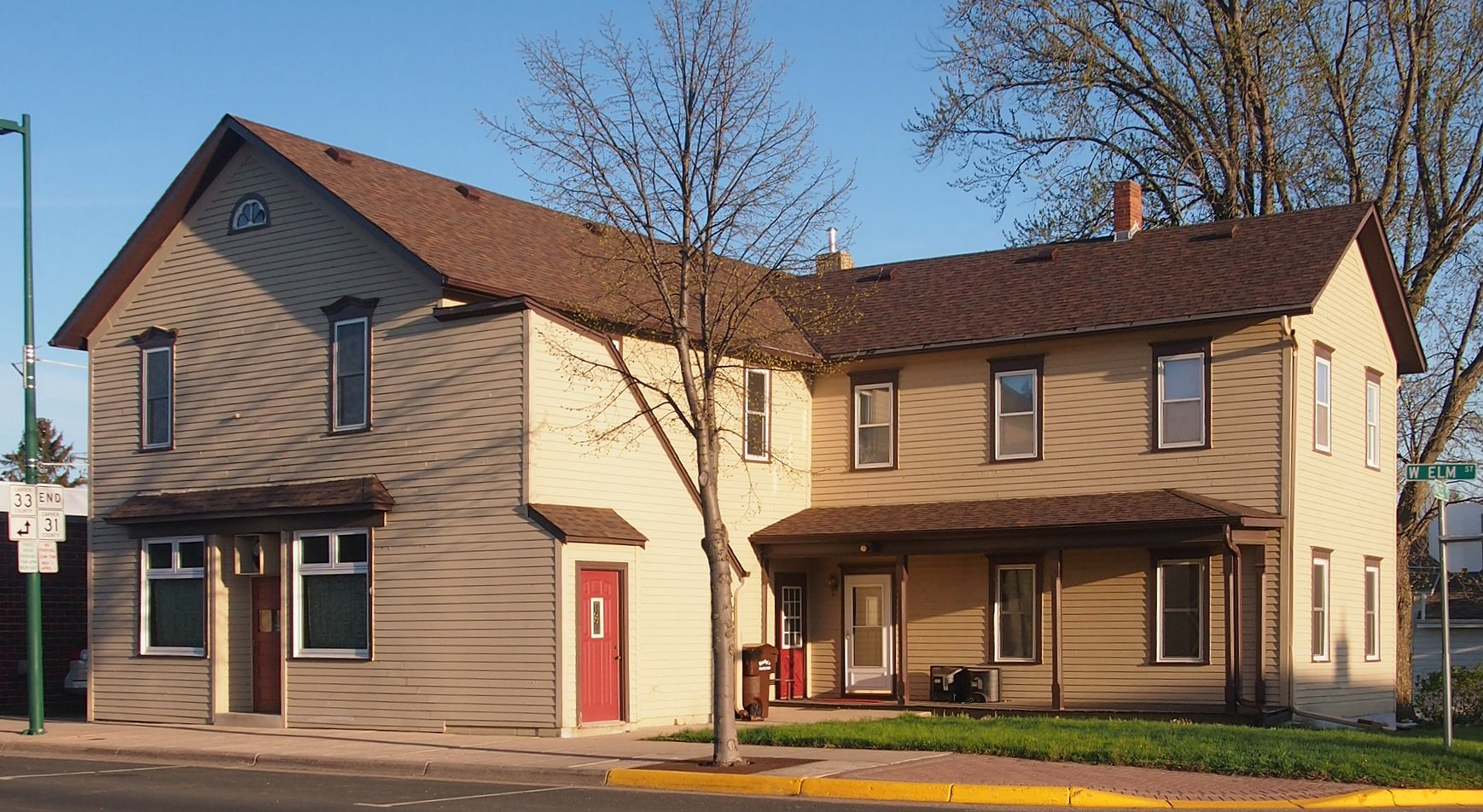
- The Winter Saloon from the northwest

- Location within Minnesota Location within the United States
- Location: Elm and Hazel Streets, Norwood Young America, Minnesota
- Coordinates: 44°46′4″N 93°55′40.5″W
- Area: less than one acre
- Built: 1890
- Architectural style: L-plan
- MPS: Carver County MRA
- NRHP reference No.: 80001979
- Added to NRHP: January 4, 1980

The Winter Saloon, also known as Harm's Bar, is a historic structure in Norwood Young America, Minnesota, United States. The building was placed on the National Register of Historic Places (NRHP) on January 4, 1980.

== Structure ==
The Winter Saloon is located on the corner of Elm and Hazel Streets in the central business district of historic Norwood, Minnesota. The town merged with neighboring Young America in 1997 to become Norwood Young America. The L-shaped, two story wood frame structure is sheathed in clapboard and topped with a gable roof. The orientation of the plan allows the commercial section to front the main street while the residential section is set back to allow for a front porch and small lawn.

The gable end of the commercial section forms the street facade. The original fenestration remains, including the design of the store front, the four-over-four double hung windows with peaked cornices and a fanlight near the top of the gable. The second floor of the commercial section originally served as a meeting hall and has an exterior enclosed staircase. The residential section is divided into three bays which front on the street. A one-story porch running the length of the street facade, and uses a simple configuration supported by three square posts with beveled corners. The windows for this section are two-over-two double hung and capped with simple cornices.

== Significance ==
The Winter Saloon is the oldest and best preserved of Norwood Young America's bars, and is a dominating architectural feature in the small downtown. The original owners, the Winter Brothers, received the first liquor license in Norwood in 1891. Known as a "thirst parlor", it was located on the first floor of the commercial portion of the building. The second floor meeting hall was used by various fraternal organizations such as the Degree of Honor and Modern Woodmen. The proprietor lived in the residential section of the building.

At the time the first liquor license was issued in 1891 it cost $2.08. The bar went through a series of owners until Prohibition in 1919. In 1934, after the law was repealed, the bar was purchased by George Harms, Sr. A liquor license at that time cost $200.00. The bar remained in three generations of his family and was open at the time the building was listed on the NRHP in 1980; during this period the cost of a liquor license peaked at $1500 in 1954.

== See also ==
- National Register of Historic Places listings in Carver County, Minnesota
