= Heck House (Chanhassen, Minnesota) =

Historical farmhouse in Minnesota, US

- Albertine and Fred Heck House
- U.S. National Register of Historic Places
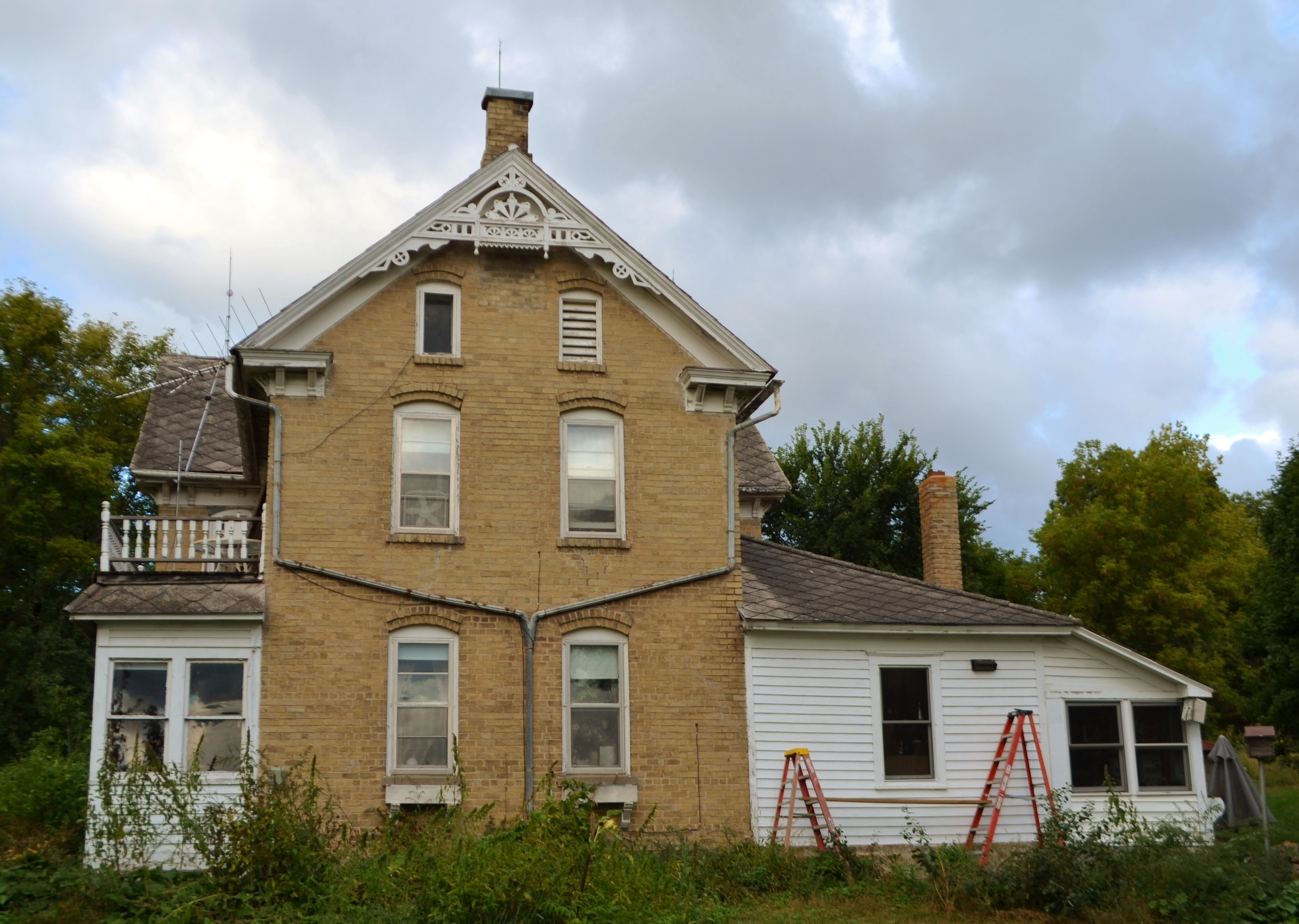
- The Heck House in Chanhassen, Minnesota.

- Location within Minnesota Location within the United States
- Location: 8941 Audubon Road, Chanhassen, Minnesota, 55317.
- Coordinates: 44°50′33.39″N 93°33′53.71″W
- Area: 7.55 acres (3.06 ha)
- Built: 1895-1896
- Architect: Friederich "Fred" Heck
- Architectural style: Tudor
- NRHP reference No.: 00001508
- Added to NRHP: December 27, 2000

The Albertine and Fred Heck House also called the Heck House is a historical farmhouse in Chanhassen, Minnesota and is listed on the National Register of Historic Places. The farms main house is constructed from the regionally famous Chaska brick.

== History ==
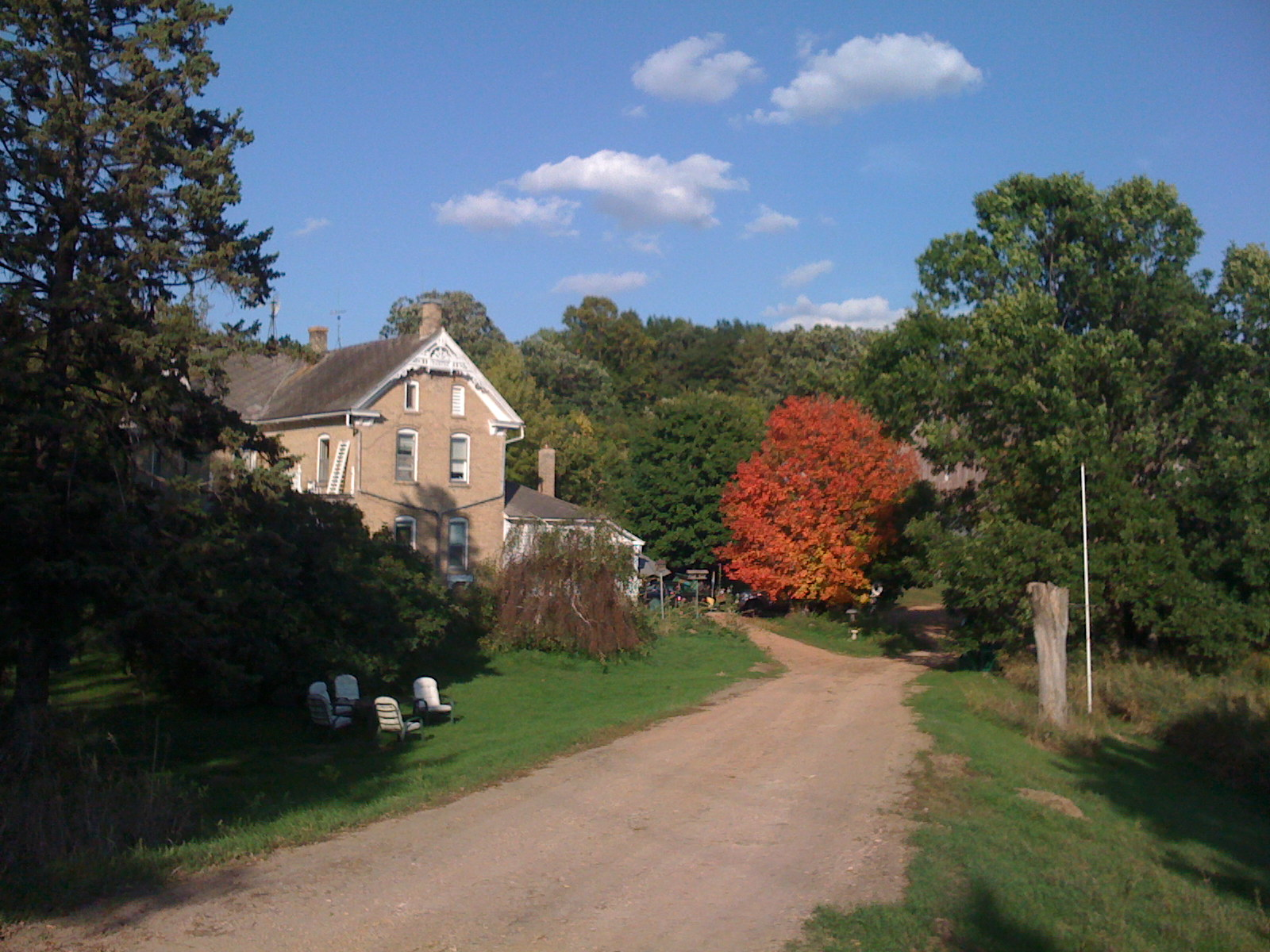
The Heck House as seen from Audubon Road.

The area which would later become the farmstead owned by the Heck family was first settled in 1881 by Friedrich Heck (1845-1921) and Albertina Heck (1852-1926), two German American immigrants from Prussia. The Heck family first lived in Shakopee and Chaska until moving to the small settlement of Chanhassen, Minnesota, then called St. Hubertus after the local Catholic Church of St. Hubertus.

The Heck family built their house from 1895 to 1896 out of Chaska brick, a common local brick made just south of the farmstead in Chaska. Chaska brick is known for its cream color, density, and high clay content as much of the materials were extracted from the nearby Minnesota River. The Heck family primarily worked in the field of dairy production, mainly working with Brown Swiss cattle and producing milk. The farm eventually included a barn, chicken coop, smokehouse, machine shed, and granary, along with the house and garage.

Friedrich and Albertina Heck remained owners of the home until 1916 when the home was then turned over to their children and occupied by their son, Frederick "Fred" Wilhelm Franz Heck (1890-1930) and his wife Ida Matilda Heck (née: Hennig) (1894-1975). When Fred died in 1930 Ida and Fredrick's daughter, Marion, took over residence, after Ida's death in 1975, Marion would live in the home until 2001. Marion took pride in the preservation of the property. Marion was the last of the Heck family to own and occupy the home. It was her effort, at age 74, that placed the home on the National Register of Historic Places in 2001.

== The Farmhouse ==
The house is a 2-story building and arranged in a "T" floor plan. The house's walls are made out of a mix of rubble stone and Chaska brick. The house's roof is constructed of cement asbestos shingles. The house is close to Bluff Creek and is surrounded by hills to the north and prairies to the south. The property also features a mixed-use outer budling which was also constructed of Chaska brick, it was destroyed in 1950.

== National Register Criterion ==
The property meets the NRHP's criteria as a historic place for the following reasons:

"The Albertine and Fred Heck House meets National Register Criterion A under the Area of Significance "Industry" as a well-preserved example of a building constructed of Chaska brick, and relates to the "Railroads and Agricultural Development (1870-1940)" statewide historic context. The house is significant for its association with brick manufacture in Chaska, an important local industry which produced a distinctive building material".
