= Susie Schmitt Hanson =

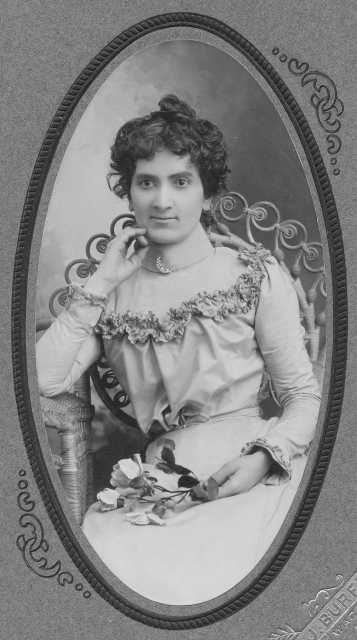
- Portrait of Susie Schmitt Hanson, c. 1885
- Born: Susan Schmitt; August 13, 1860; Chaska, Minnesota, U.S.
- Died: October 7, 1956 (aged 96)

Susie Schmitt Hanson (August 13, 1860–October 7, 1956) was a milliner, dressmaker and entrepreneur from Minnesota. As the owner of one of Waconia's longest-running businesses, she remains a prominent figure in the history of that town.

Susan "Susie" Schmitt was born on August 13, 1860, in the village of Chaska. She was one of eight children of John and Rosina Schmitt. The others were Andrew, Casper, Anna, Caroline, Bernice, and twins Joseph and Josephine.

Schmitt was a talented seamstress from a young age. She turned that gift into a career spanning nearly seven decades, working on quilts, dresses, hats, hat pins, and more. Susie Schmitt first entered the millinery (hat making) business in 1888 as an apprentice for four years in the city of St. Paul. Afterward, she returned to Chaska to run a dressmaking business. That business operated for twelve years.

In 1898, Schmitt opened her own dressmaking and millinery shop in Waconia. Four years later, she moved the shop to a prime location on Main Street after purchasing the A. Ed. Kauder property for $2,300. At this new location, the store focused on millinery. Schmitt operated the business for forty-eight years, until she sold it to Mrs. Elva Ellison in 1946. She continued making and remodeling hats in a smaller shop. Schmitt also maintained scrapbooks of newspaper clippings of weddings, obituaries and key events, which are now in the Carver County Historical Society collection along with many of her photographs and examples of her work as a milliner.

In July 1912, Schmitt married Charles Hanson, a local carpenter born in March 1861. The couple never had children of their own, leaving Schmitt to care for and spoil her nieces and nephews. After Hanson died on June 16, 1932, Schmitt outlived him by twenty-four years, until her own death on October 7, 1956, at the age of 96.
