= Coney Island of the West =

- U.S. National Register of Historic Places
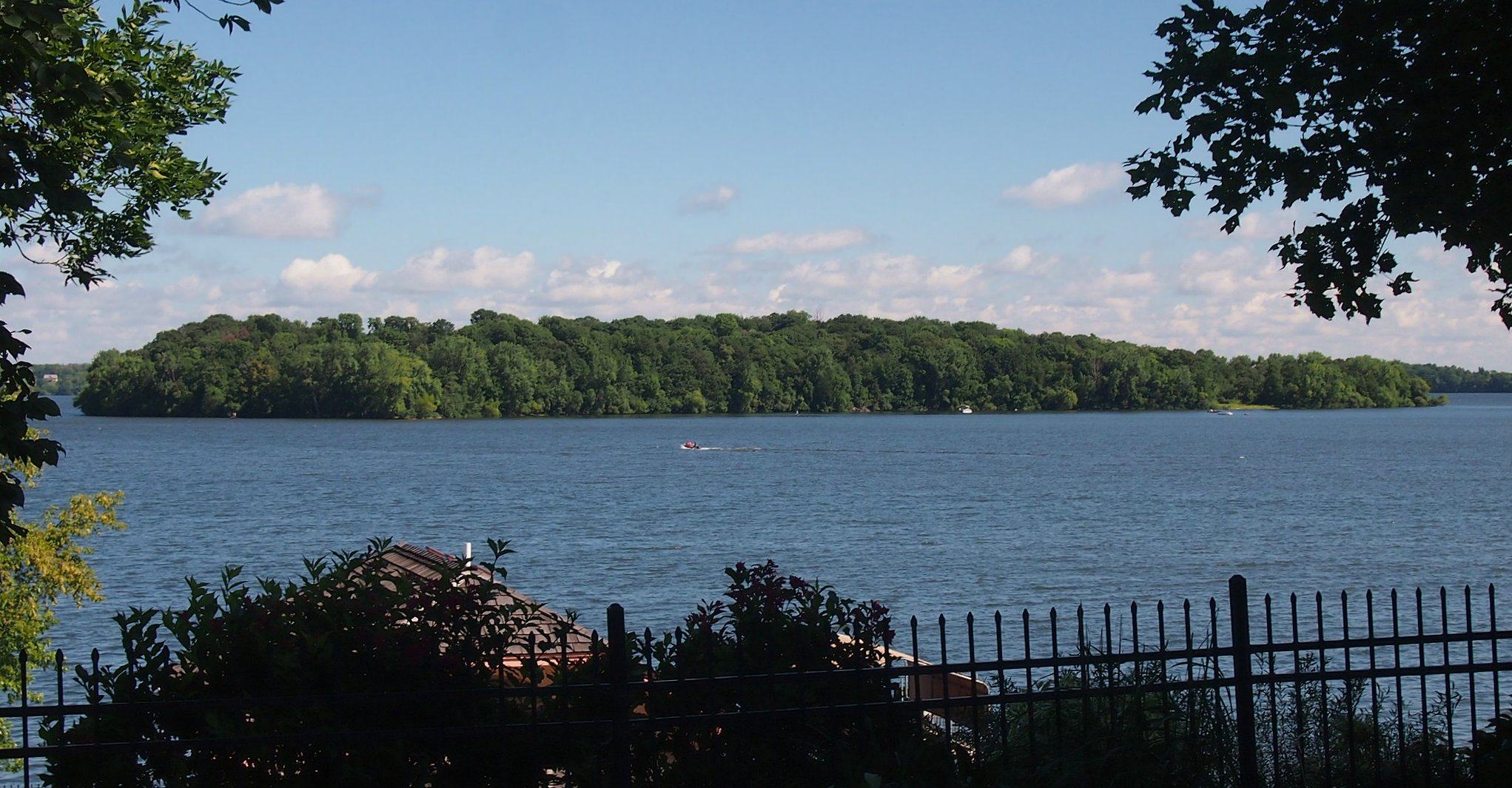
- Coney Island of the West from the mainland

- Location within Minnesota Location within the United States
- Location: Lake Waconia, Waconia Township, Minnesota
- Coordinates: 44°51′40″N 93°47′1″W
- Area: 31 acres (13 ha)
- Built: 1880–1920
- Built by: Emile Amblard
- Architectural style: Stick/Eastlake
- NRHP reference No.: 76001048
- Designated: August 11, 1976

Coney Island of the West is an island in Lake Waconia in the U.S. state of Minnesota that was developed into a summer resort with its heyday from the 1880s to the 1920s. It continued operating up to 1960. The 31-acre (13 ha) island is part of Waconia Township just .5 miles (0.80 km) off the shore from the city of Waconia. It was listed on the National Register of Historic Places in 1976 for its local significance in the themes of commerce and entertainment/recreation. The island site, with its ruins of hotels, cottages, and parks, was nominated for being one of Minnesota's most popular early resorts, and an early expression of the trend of urban dwellers journeying to Minnesota's lakes and parks for recreation. Lambert Naegele (an immigrant from Germany who published German language newspapers), Reinhold Zeglin (also an immigrant from Germany), and Emile Amblard (originally from France) developed resort buildings and attractions on the island. The best preserved building from this era, however, is the Emile Amblard Guest House on the mainland.

== History ==
The island has received human visitors for over 1,500 years. It is located in a region that was the first home to the Dakota people. Euro-American settlers colonized the area in the mid-19th century, with settlers going to the island during the Dakota War of 1862 in fear of battles in Carver County. The island was sought as a refuge because of its clear distant views, but the war resolved before reaching the county. The St. Paul and Sioux City Railroad purchased the land in 1866. They sold it to private buyers in 1874. The buyers eventually sold the 31.85-acre (12.89 ha) island to Lambert Naegele in March 1884 for $5,200. While Waconia already had several hotels such as the North Star, Lake House, and the Sherman House, the Coney Island Hotel and its resort became the most popular of all of Waconia's hotels and contributed to the town's status as a favorite summer resort.

Lambert Naegele developed the island and named it "Coney Island of the West". The origin of this name is unclear. Some claim it is named after the Coney Island entertainment center on the East Coast. Others think that it comes from the large numbers of "coneys", or rabbits that lived on the island. Finally, one group claims "Coney" is just a shortened version of "Waconia". There is not enough evidence to definitively support one of these claims over the others, however.

As part of his initial development, Lambert Naegele divided the island into lots, parks, and streets. He named the streets for famous German authors, such as Goethe, Uhland, Schiller, and Lessing. He sold plots to private owners. Naegele also built a large hotel and private cabins, for either rent or sale. In 1886 a new hotel later known as the boarding house or dormitory, several more cottages, and a boathouse were added. Naegele suffered poor health, forcing a move to better climates in Montana. In 1889 Naegele sold the hotel complex to Reinhold Zeglin, whose family had taken possession of it at the end of the summer season in August 1888.

Zeglin, a German immigrant like Naegele, made plans for a third hotel, designed to sleep one to two hundred guests. With this added space, numbers of hotel guests began to rise. Part of the draw was Zeglin's addition of a bowling alley and Sunday concerts to amuse his guests. He also built a laundry, dining room, kitchen, and pavilion as part of his new hotel. In 1895 Zeglin rented Coney Island Hotel and resort to Emil Krueger of Stillwater, Minnesota, but he returned to run it again in 1896.

The resort's reputation was growing. Guests came to stay for periods of weeks or months, with many remaining all summer. Some, like Emile Amblard, the "Duke of Clearwater Lake", stayed permanently. Amblard, a French winemaker and businessman, came to visit and loved the island and town so well that he never left. Guests came from nearby Minneapolis–Saint Paul and elsewhere in Minnesota. Others came from New York, Ohio, and Illinois, or as far away as Europe and South Africa. There were even some famous guests. The guest register from June 20, 1896 shows movie star Sarah Bernhardt staying at the hotel. Between 1903 and 1905, the University of Minnesota Gophers held pre-season practices on the island's football field.

Zeglin's sons took over the resort in 1909. However business was beginning to slow by 1919 due to outside factors. The car allowed people to travel farther with more ease than trains. With this new flexibility, vacationers chose to spend summers in other states rather than locally. In 1927 the name was changed from Coney to Paradise Island, to encourage more guest visits. The name would not last. The Zeglin family sold the resort in 1939 to Frank Dvorak.

Frank "Shorty" Dvorak bought land on the island in 1939, soon adding a dance hall, a restaurant, and more cabins. The island became a weekend dinner and dancing spot, rather than a resort. Dvorak sold the complex to the Day Camp Company in 1959. The island deteriorated due to lack of proper maintenance, and their contract defaulted back to Dvorak in 1960. He was the last owner who operated the island as a place for entertainment.

Since 1960, the island has had many private owners. Vandalism and time took their toll on the island. In 1975 efforts were started to rehabilitate it, led by the Waconia Bicentennial Committee's Island Committee. In 1976, Coney Island of the West was placed on the National Register of Historic Places. Beginning in 2016, the island was placed under development by Carver County to be open to the public as part of Lake Waconia Regional Park. A master plan for the island's development was approved in December 2016. The approved master plan for the island includes trails, camping, a garden, beaches, picnic areas, and a boat ramp.

== See also ==
- National Register of Historic Places listings in Carver County, Minnesota
