= Carver Historic District =

Historic district in Minnesota, United States

- U.S. National Register of Historic Places
- U.S. Historic district
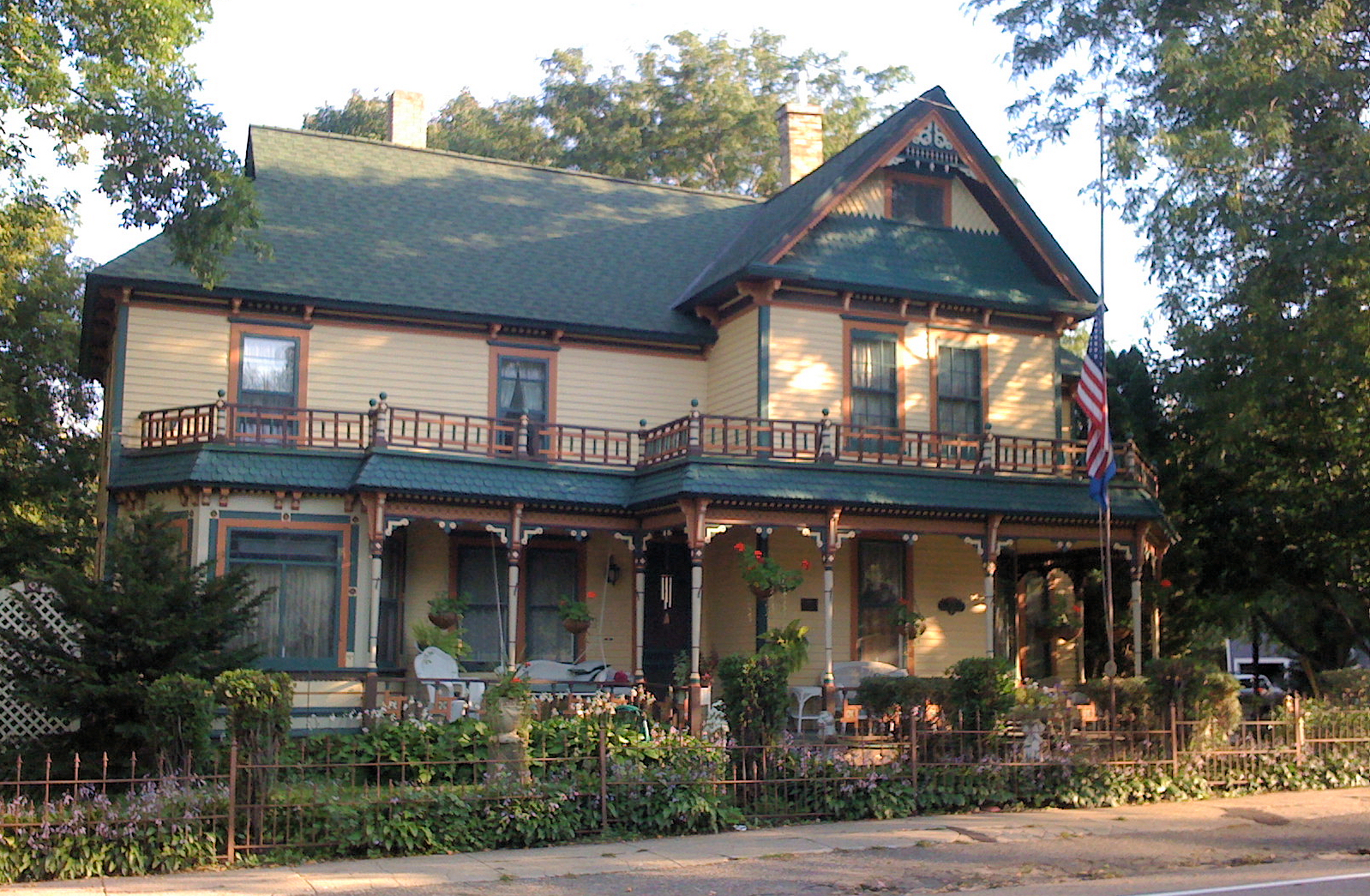
- The 1891 John Hebeison House within Carver Historic District

- Location within Minnesota Location within the United States
- Location: Roughly bounded by Lime, 1st, Walnut and 6th Streets, Carver, Minnesota
- Coordinates: 44°45′49″N 93°37′32″W
- Area: Approximately 60 acres (24 ha)
- Built: 1852–1900
- MPS: Carver County MRA
- NRHP reference No.: 80001960
- Designated HD: January 4, 1980

Carver Historic District is a historic district in Carver, Minnesota, United States. It was listed on the National Register of Historic Places in 1980 for having state-level significance in the themes of architecture, commerce, exploration/settlement, industry, and transportation. The district encompasses about 100 contributing properties mostly built from 1855 to 1880. It was nominated for being the well-preserved core of a Minnesota River town, and Carver County's greatest concentration of historically and architecturally significant buildings.

== History ==
The city of Carver was one of the earliest communities in Carver County. Located on the Minnesota River, it was often the first place immigrants to Carver County visited. From there they spread out to other towns and farms. Norwegian immigrant Axel Jorgenson settled in the area that became Carver in the winter of 1851–1852. In 1854 Jorgenson sold his land to a group of townsite investors from Saint Paul, called the Carver Land Company. Minnesota Territorial Governor Alexander Ramsey was part of this group. He suggested the name "Carver" for the town site after Jonathan Carver, who first explored the area.

By 1855 the town of Carver was already growing. It had a tailor, a hotel, a boarding house, a building designer, a carpenter, a livery stable, a blacksmith, two shoemakers, and a general store. By 1857, 35 buildings existed in Carver. The area was a main stopping point in trade and immigrant travel along the Minnesota River. In 1877 Carver was incorporated as the Village of Carver. By the 1890s Carver was one of the biggest settlements in the county.

Carver's future changed with the loss of river trade during railroad development. When railroads were built, they bypassed Carver, taking businesses with them. The Prohibition era from 1920 to 1933 made this worse, as many saloons and hotels shut down. Carver became impoverished. Simple lack of money protected historic structures from being torn down. There was no new building and growth. However more was needed to stop future destruction of the historic town. On June 25, 1969 a non-profit corporation called Carver-on-the-Minnesota, Incorporated was created. The group began by raising money to buy buildings in need of repair. This was the seed of the Carver Historic District.

Carver-on-the-Minnesota created restoration plans and design guidelines for restorations in historic Carver. They also serve as a source for historic building research. Their work led to even more buildings being preserved. In 1980, the old town of Carver was chosen as one of the first historic districts in Minnesota, due in part to the work of this organization. Carver Historic District contains 87 buildings and four other structures of importance. National Register signs mark many district buildings. They vary from private homes and businesses to churches and public buildings. Buildings range in time from 1852–1925. Many of them have been returned to their original look and style.

In February 1989 the city of Carver created a Heritage Preservation Commission. Their goal was to help the City Council, Planning and Zoning Commission, and Parks Department with preservation work. Carver was named a Preserve America community by the federal government in 2007. It was only the eighth so to be named in the state of Minnesota.

== See also ==
- List of Preserve America Communities
- National Register of Historic Places listings in Carver County, Minnesota
