= Waconia, Minnesota =

City in Minnesota, United States

- City
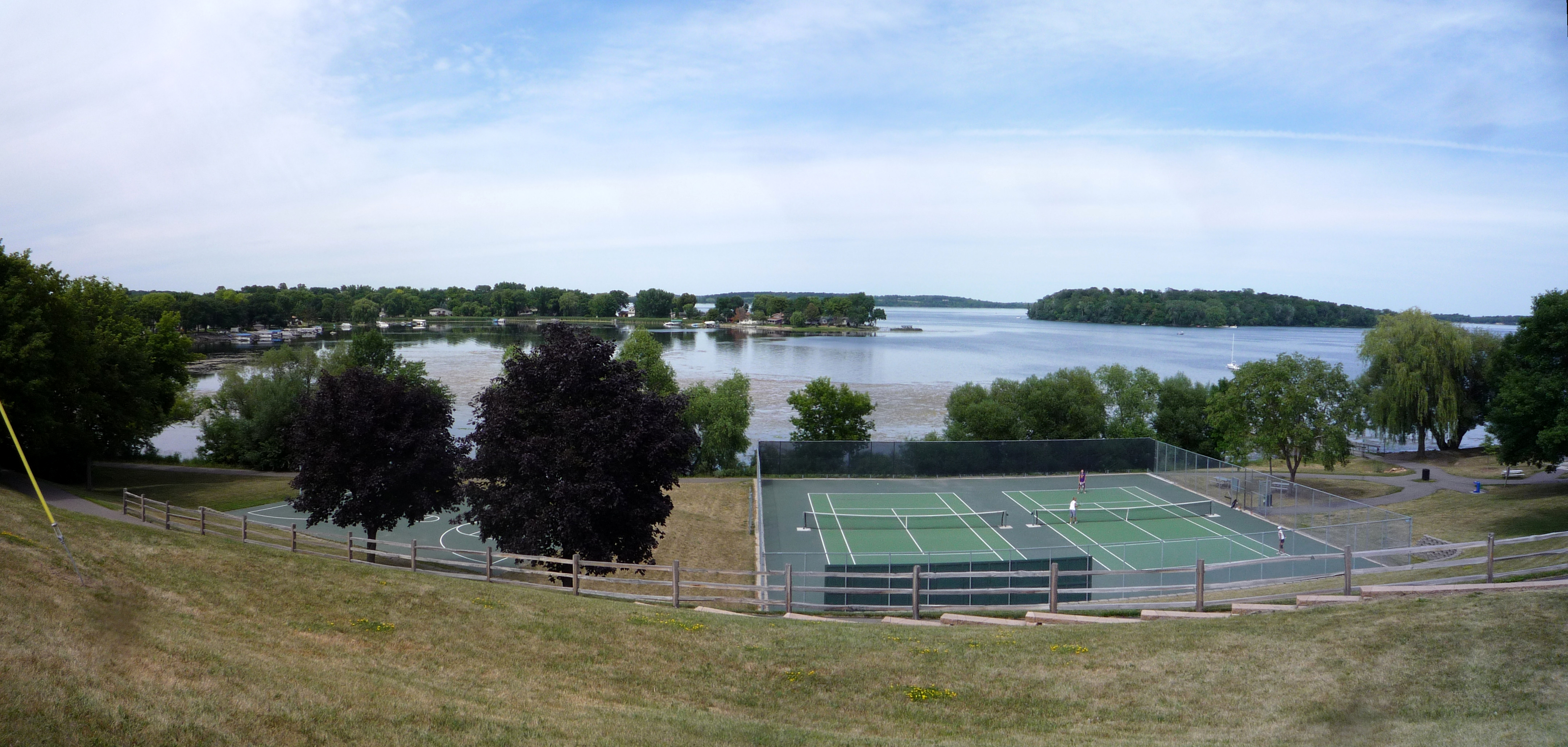
- View of Lake Waconia

- Flag

- Location of the city of Waconia within Carver County, Minnesota
- Coordinates: 44°50′29″N 93°47′24″W
- Country: United States
- State: Minnesota
- County: Carver

Government
  - Mayor: Tim Litfin

Area
  - Total: 5.31 sq mi (13.76 km^{2})
  - Land: 5.28 sq mi (13.67 km^{2})
  - Water: 0.035 sq mi (0.09 km^{2})
- Elevation: 981 ft (299 m)

Population (2020)
  - Total: 13,033
  - Estimate (2023): 13,742
  - Density: 2,468.9/sq mi (953.23/km^{2})
- Time zone: UTC–6 (Central (CST))
  - Summer (DST): UTC–5 (CDT)
- ZIP Code: 55387
- Area code: 952
- FIPS code: 27-67432
- GNIS feature ID: 2397159
- Website: www.waconiamn.gov

Waconia (/wəˈkoʊnjə/ wə-KOHN-yə or /wəˈkoʊniə/ wə-KOH-nee-ə) is a city in Carver County, Minnesota, United States. Waconia attracts visitors to nearby Lake Waconia.

The population was 13,033 at the 2020 census.

== Geography ==
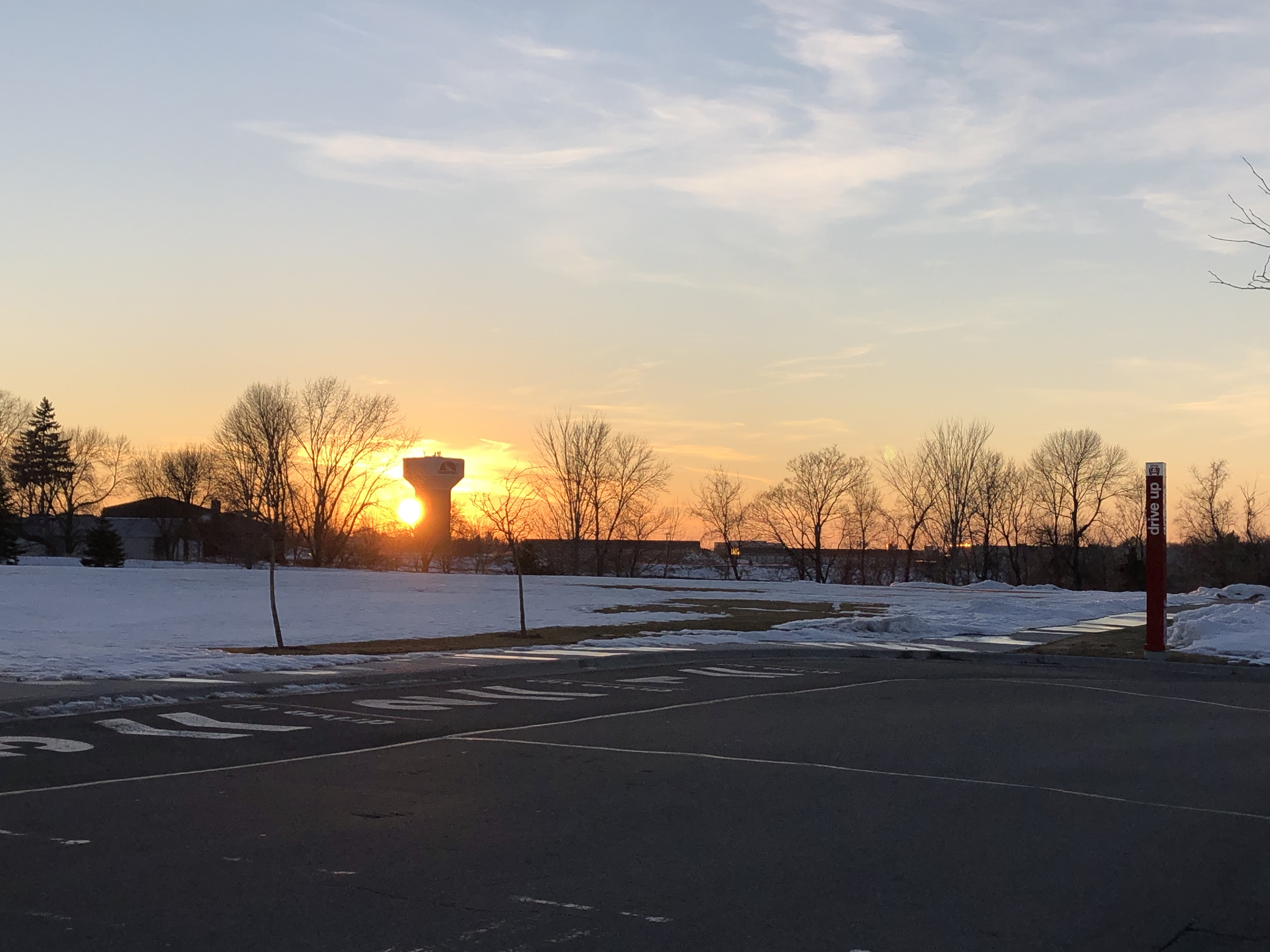
Sunset behind a water tower in Waconia

According to the United States Census Bureau, the city has an area of 4.39 square miles (11.37 km^{2}), of which 4.34 square miles (11.24 km^{2}) is land and 0.05 square miles (0.13 km^{2}) is water.

Minnesota State Highways 5 and 284 and Carver County Highway 10 are the main routes in Waconia.

== Demographics ==
Historical population
| Census | Pop. | Note | %± |
|---|---|---|---|
| 1880 | 218 | | — |
| 1890 | 441 | | 102.3% |
| 1900 | 728 | | 65.1% |
| 1910 | 817 | | 12.2% |
| 1920 | 901 | | 10.3% |
| 1930 | 1,291 | | 43.3% |
| 1940 | 1,315 | | 1.9% |
| 1950 | 1,569 | | 19.3% |
| 1960 | 2,048 | | 30.5% |
| 1970 | 2,445 | | 19.4% |
| 1980 | 2,638 | | 7.9% |
| 1990 | 3,498 | | 32.6% |
| 2000 | 6,814 | | 94.8% |
| 2010 | 10,697 | | 57.0% |
| 2020 | 13,033 | | 21.8% |
| 2023 (est.) | 13,742 | | 5.4% |
U.S. Decennial Census; 2020 Census

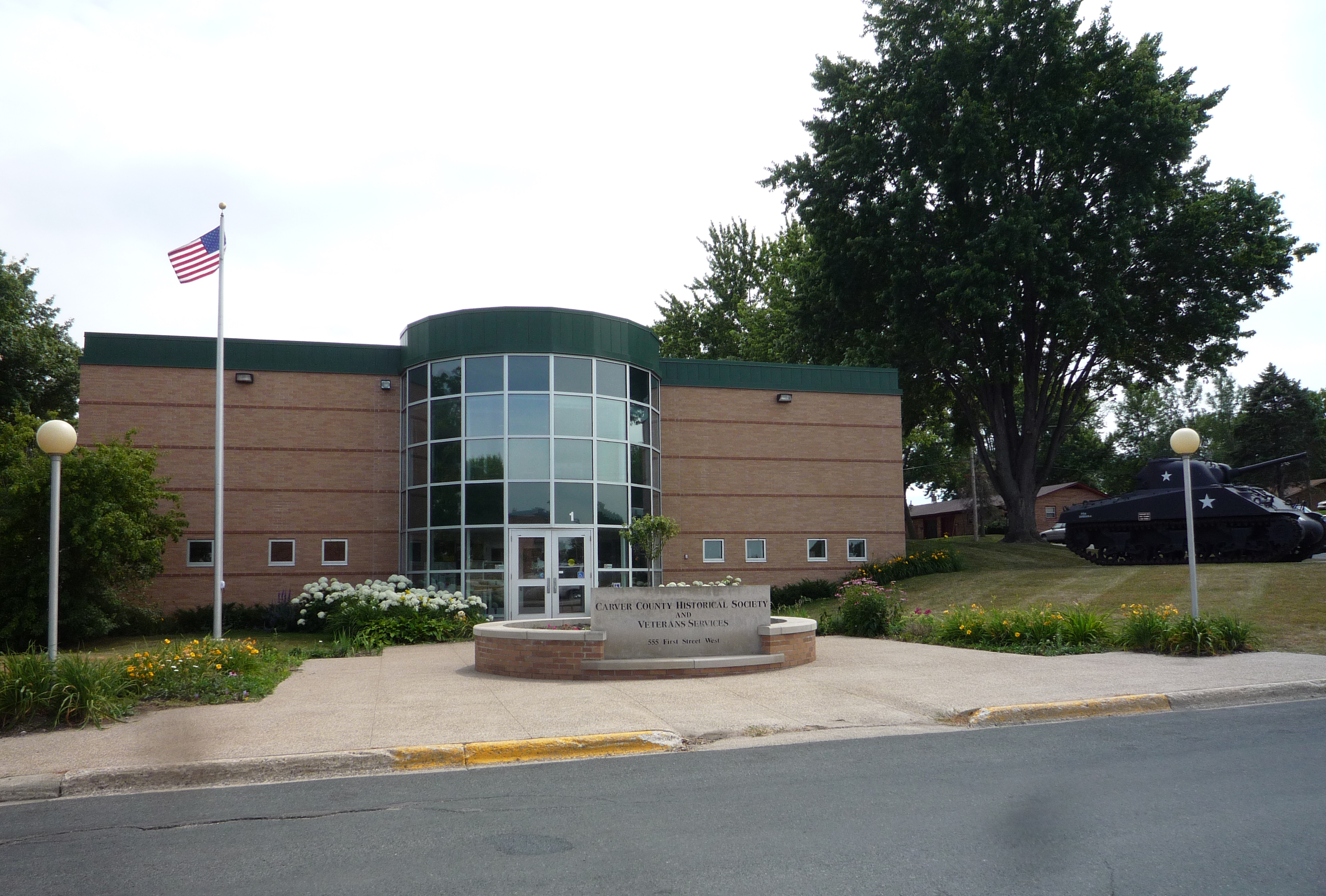
Carver County Historical Society Museum

=== 2020 census ===
As of the 2020 census, Waconia had a population of 13,033. The median age was 37.6 years. 29.4% of residents were under the age of 18 and 13.2% of residents were 65 years of age or older. For every 100 females there were 96.4 males, and for every 100 females age 18 and over there were 91.3 males age 18 and over.

99.8% of residents lived in urban areas, while 0.2% lived in rural areas.

There were 4,659 households in Waconia, of which 41.8% had children under the age of 18 living in them. Of all households, 61.5% were married-couple households, 12.7% were households with a male householder and no spouse or partner present, and 21.0% were households with a female householder and no spouse or partner present. About 22.5% of all households were made up of individuals and 10.8% had someone living alone who was 65 years of age or older.

There were 4,826 housing units, of which 3.5% were vacant. The homeowner vacancy rate was 0.8% and the rental vacancy rate was 5.4%.

Racial composition as of the 2020 census
| Race | Number | Percent |
|---|---|---|
| White | 11,841 | 90.9% |
| Black or African American | 132 | 1.0% |
| American Indian and Alaska Native | 38 | 0.3% |
| Asian | 163 | 1.3% |
| Native Hawaiian and Other Pacific Islander | 1 | 0.0% |
| Some other race | 176 | 1.4% |
| Two or more races | 682 | 5.2% |
| Hispanic or Latino (of any race) | 500 | 3.8% |

=== 2010 census ===
As of the census of 2010, there were 10,697 people, 3,909 households, and 2,748 families living in the city. The population density was 2,464.7 inhabitants per square mile (951.6/km^{2}). There were 4,112 housing units at an average density of 947.5 per square mile (365.8/km^{2}). The racial makeup of the city was 95.7% White, 1.1% African American, 0.3% Native American, 1.1% Asian, 0.7% from other races, and 1.1% from two or more races. Hispanic or Latino of any race were 2.5% of the population.

There were 3,909 households, of which 45.2% had children under the age of 18 living with them, 60.1% were married couples living together, 7.1% had a female householder with no husband present, 3.0% had a male householder with no wife present, and 29.7% were non-families. 25.6% of all households were made up of individuals, and 12% had someone living alone who was 65 years of age or older. The average household size was 2.70 and the average family size was 3.31.

The median age in the city was 34.9 years. 32.5% of residents were under the age of 18; 5% were between the ages of 18 and 24; 30.7% were from 25 to 44; 20.7% were from 45 to 64; and 11.3% were 65 years of age or older. The gender makeup of the city was 48.4% male and 51.6% female.

=== 2000 census ===
As of the census of 2000, there were 6,814 people, 2,568 households, and 1,848 families living in the city. The population density was 2,432.0 inhabitants per square mile (939.0/km^{2}). There were 2,646 housing units at an average density of 944.4 per square mile (364.6/km^{2}). The racial makeup of the city was 97.06% White, 0.34% African American, 0.12% Native American, 0.65% Asian, 0.01% Pacific Islander, 1.00% from other races, and 0.82% from two or more races. Hispanic or Latino of any race were 1.28% of the population.

There were 2,568 households, out of which 40.7% had children under the age of 18 living with them, 61.0% were married couples living together, 7.8% had a female householder with no husband present, and 28.0% were non-families. 23.3% of all households were occupied by one person and 12.2% had someone living alone who was 65 years of age or older. The average household size was 2.62 and the average family size was 3.12.

The city population had a wide age variety; with 29.9% being under the age of 18, 5.8% from 18 to 24, 35.5% from 25 to 44, 16.3% from 45 to 64, and 12.4% who were 65 years of age or older. The median age was 33 years. For every 100 females, there were 91.1 males. For every 100 females age 18 and over, there were 89.5 males.

The median income for a household in the city was $55,705, and the median income for a family was $67,703. Males had a median income of $43,535 versus $29,488 for females. The per capita income for the city was $26,996. About 2.9% of families and 3.8% of the population were below the poverty line, including 3.7% of those under age 18 and 9.5% of those age 65 or over.

== Economy ==
=== Top employers ===
According to the city's 2023 Annual Comprehensive Financial Report (ACFR), the city's top employers are:

| # | Employer | # of Employees |
|---|---|---|
| 1 | Ridgeview Medical Center | 1,749 |
| 2 | Strom Aviation | 1,001 |
| 3 | I.S.D. No. 110 (Waconia Schools) | 840 |
| 4 | CabinetWorks Group | 600 |
| 5 | Mackenthun's Supermarket | 200 |
| 6 | Good Samaritan Society Waconia | 170 |
| 7 | Target | 150 |
| 8 | Lakeview Clinic | 120 |
| 9 | Laketown Electric Corp. | 111 |
| 10 | Auburn Meadows Assisted Living | 100 |

== Politics ==
Presidential election results

Presidential elections results
| Year | Republican | Democratic | Third parties |
|---|---|---|---|
| 2024 | 53.8% 4,656 | 43.6% 3,778 | 2.6% 225 |
| 2020 | 52.3% 4,132 | 45.3% 3,580 | 2.4% 186 |
| 2016 | 53.9% 3,501 | 36.7% 2,383 | 9.4% 609 |
| 2012 | 59.1% 3,548 | 39.0% 2,342 | 1.9% 110 |
| 2008 | 57.2% 3,177 | 41.3% 2,292 | 1.5% 82 |
| 2004 | 62.8% 3,073 | 36.5% 1,788 | 0.7% 34 |
| 2000 | 48.7% 1,341 | 45.5% 1,254 | 5.8% 160 |
| 1996 | 41.8% 924 | 45.3% 1,002 | 12.8% 287 |
| 1992 | 40.5% 833 | 32.1% 661 | 27.4% 562 |
| 1988 | 58.2% 939 | 41.8% 675 | 0.0% 0 |
| 1984 | 65.5% 865 | 34.5% 455 | 0.0% 0 |
| 1980 | 52.2% 751 | 39.7% 571 | 8.1% 117 |
| 1976 | 54.5% 727 | 43.3% 577 | 2.2% 30 |
| 1968 | 52.5% 627 | 44.3% 529 | 3.2% 38 |
| 1964 | 52.4% 582 | 47.4% 527 | 0.2% 2 |
| 1960 | 58.5% 614 | 41.5% 435 | 0.0% 0 |

== Education ==
Waconia Public Schools operates five schools. Waconia also has two private schools.

- Southview Elementary, grades K–5
- Bayview Elementary, grades K–5
- Laketown Elementary, grades K-5
- Waconia Middle School, grades 6–8
- St. Joseph Catholic STEM School, grades PreK–8
- Trinity Lutheran School, grades K–8
- Waconia High School, grades 9–12

== History ==
A post office has been in operation at Waconia since 1860. The city took its name from Lake Waconia.

=== National Register of Historic Places gallery ===
Several Waconia buildings are listed on the National Register of Historic Places (see: National Register of Historic Places listings in Carver County, Minnesota). One of the more prominent is Coney Island of the West on Lake Waconia, where cottages, boathouses and resort hotels attracted tourists, especially from 1884 until the late 1920s, when the rise of the automobile allowed people to travel farther away for vacations.

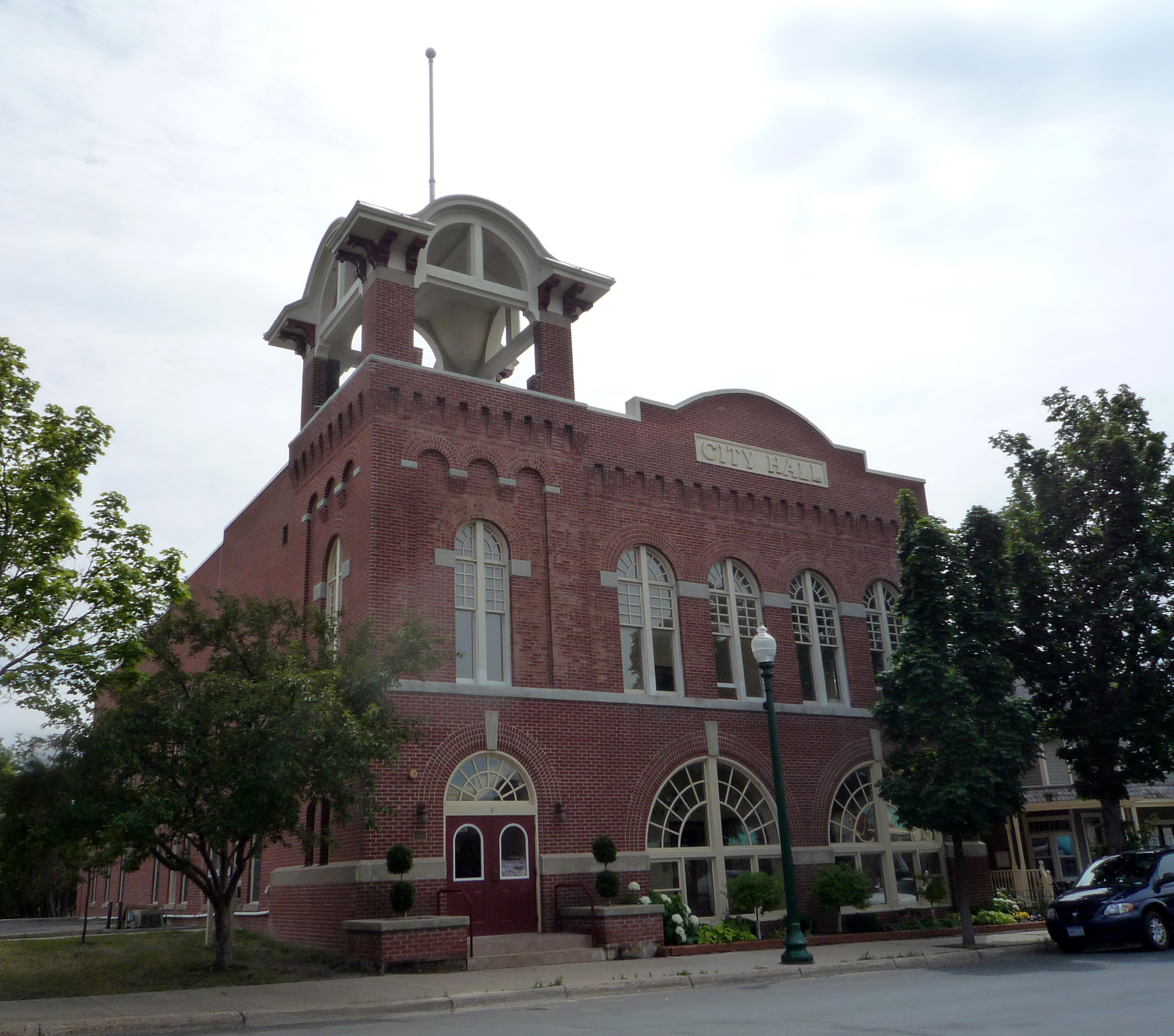
Waconia City Hall

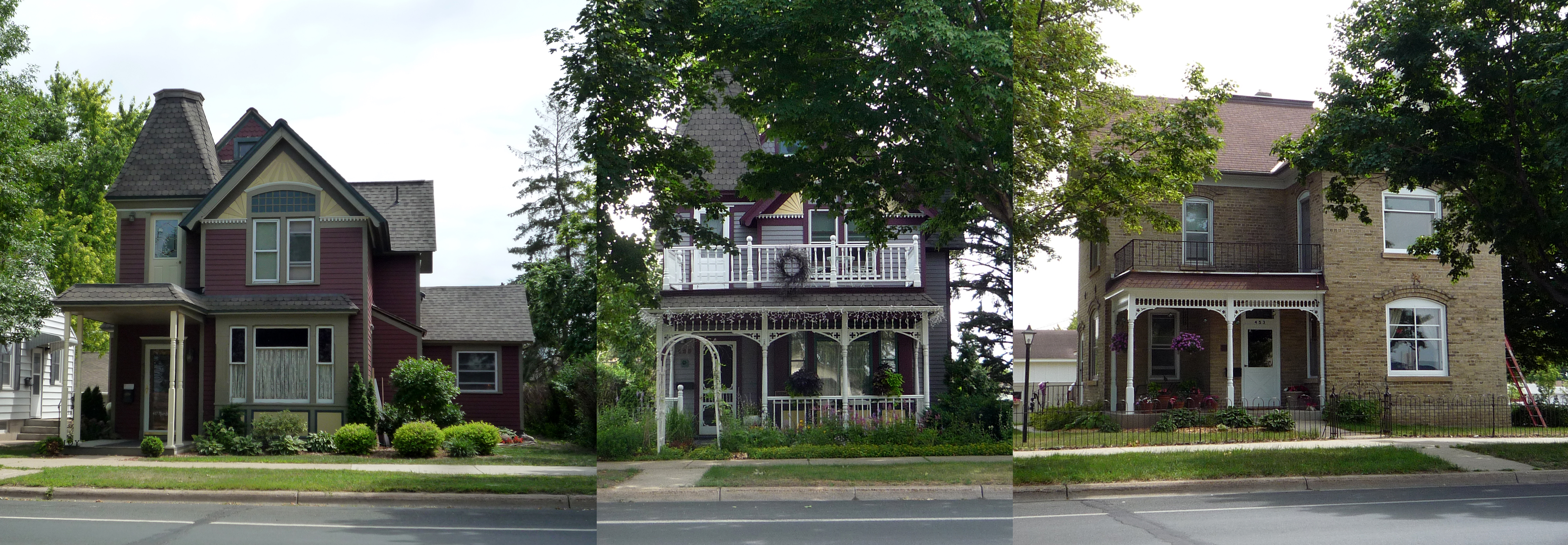
West Main Street Houses, from left to right 417, 429, and 453 W. Main St.

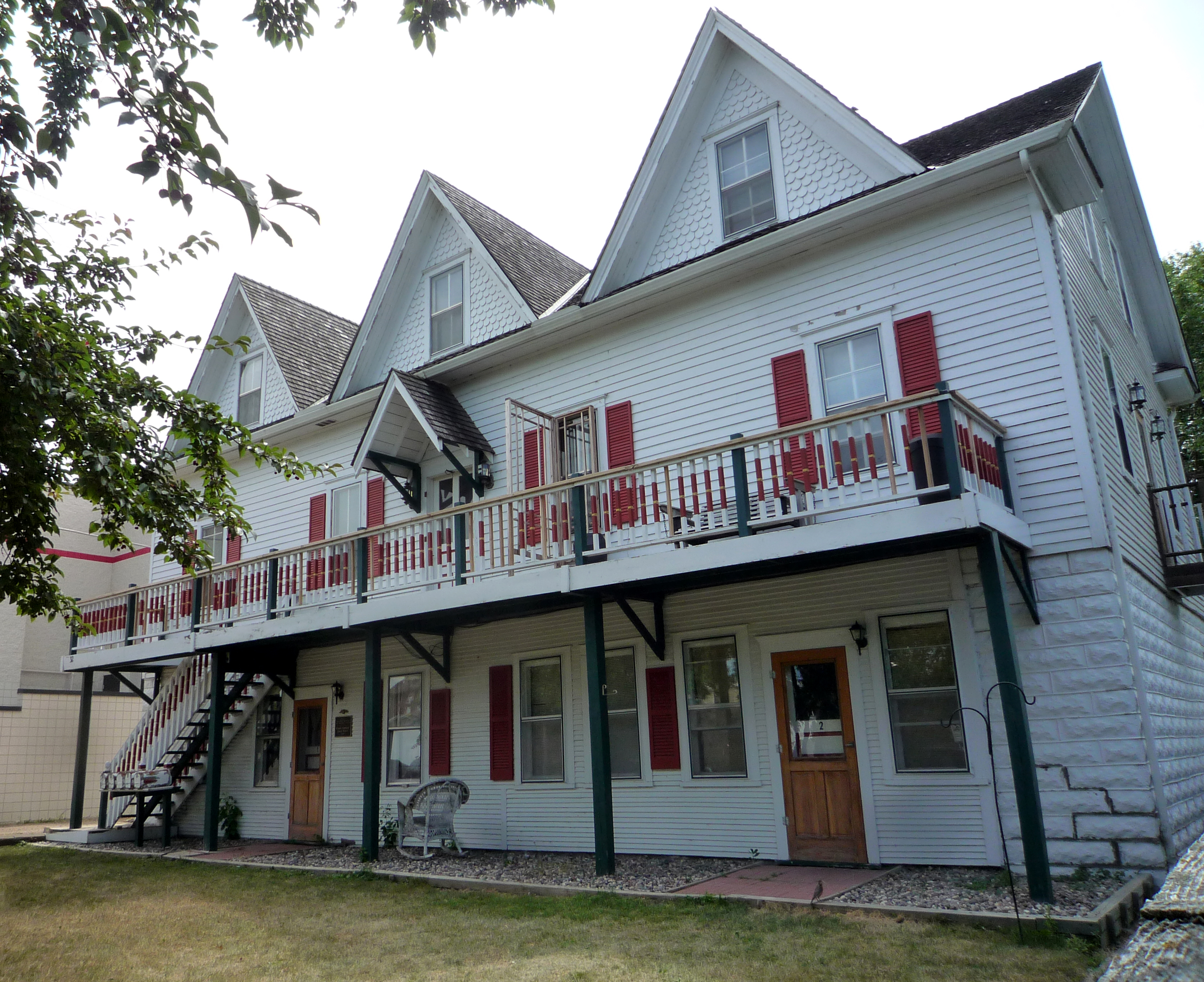
Emile Amblard Guest House

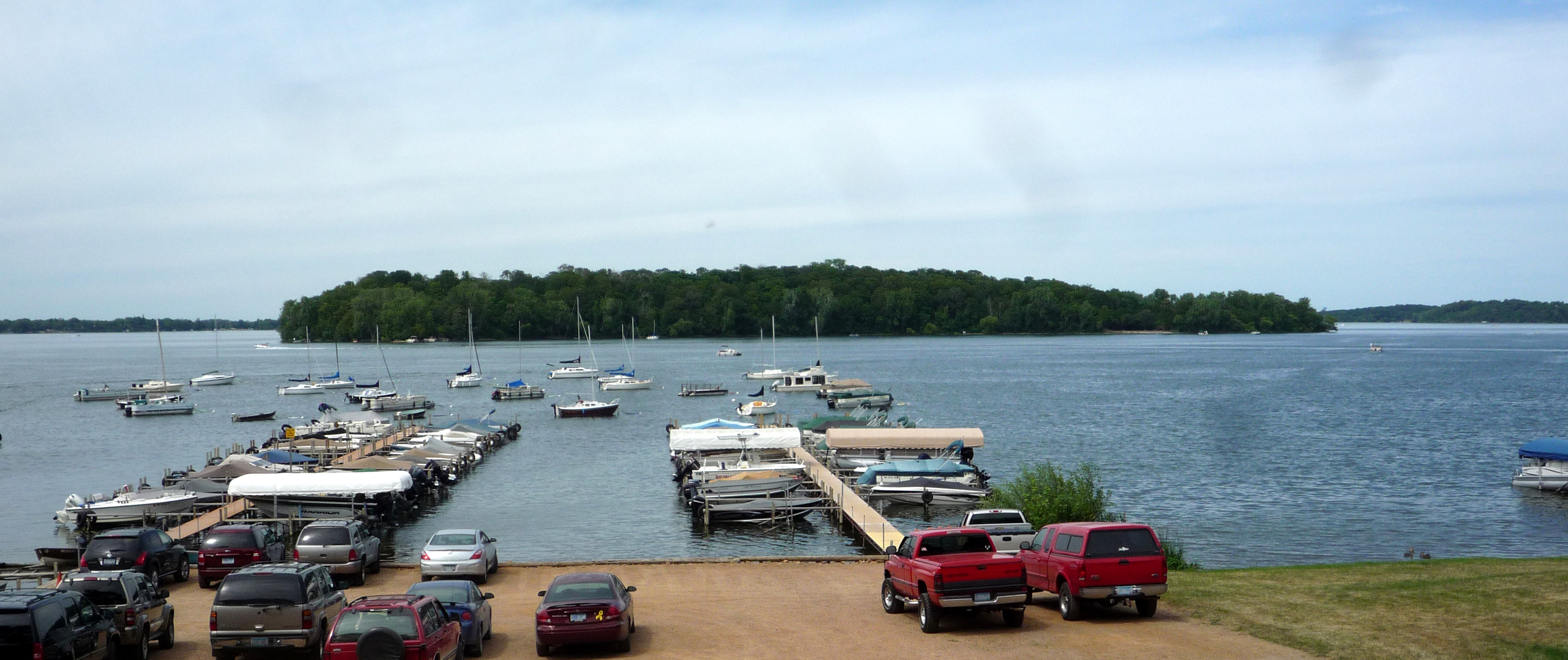
Coney Island of the West on Lake Waconia across from Waconia

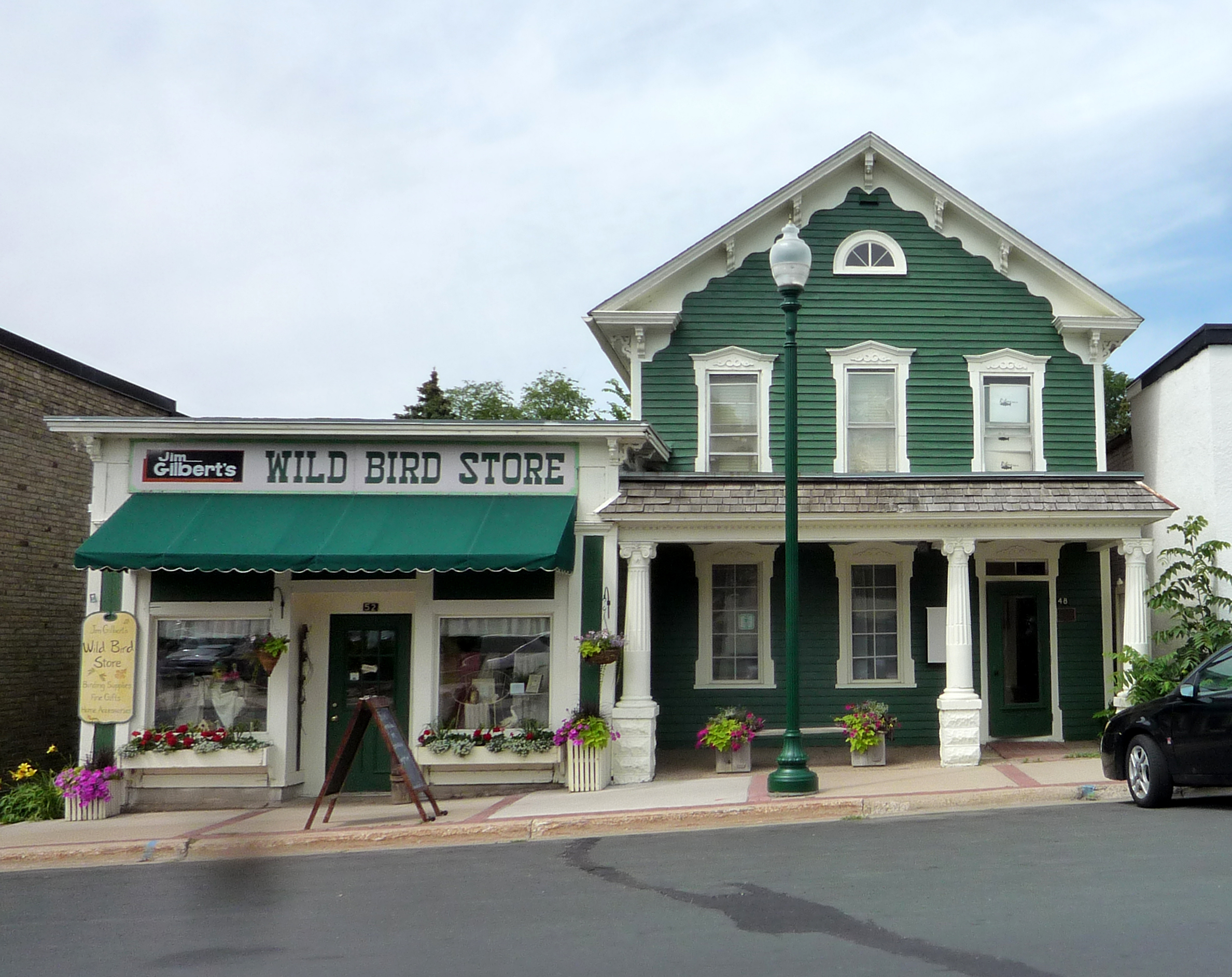
Mock Cigar Factory and House

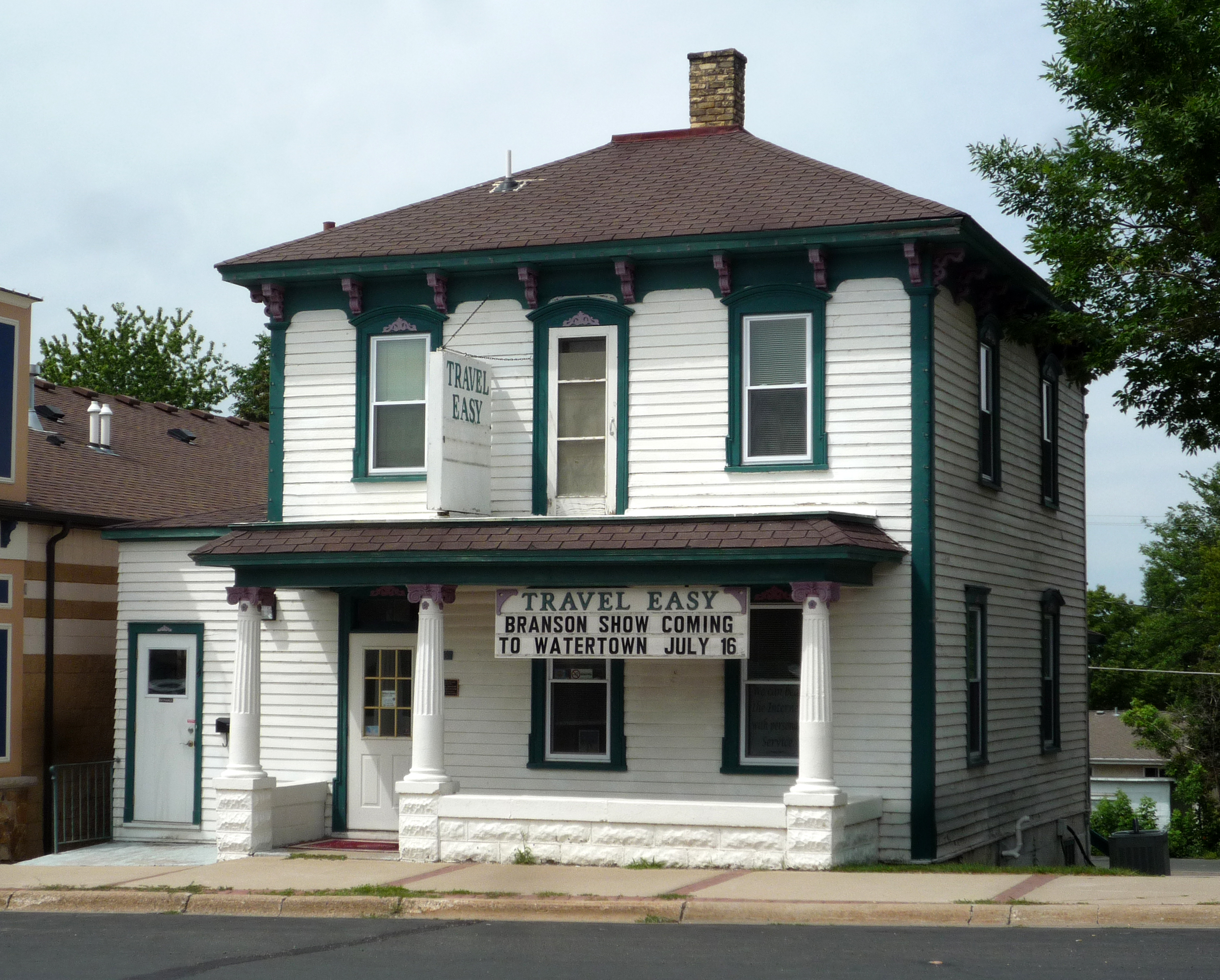
Charles Maiser House

== Popular culture ==
- In the film Drop Dead Gorgeous, 1st Street near St. Joseph's Catholic Church in Waconia is used when the swan float explodes in the parade.

== Notable people ==
- Robert O. Ashbach, Minnesota state legislator and businessman
- Jenn Bostic, singer and songwriter
- Bill Diessner, Minnesota state legislator and physician
- Aaron Elling, football player
- Don Herbert, Mr. Wizard and host of Mr. Wizard's World
- Ernst Heyd, Minnesota state legislator and county surveyor of Carver County
- Noah McCourt, politician, disability advocate and speaker
- Susie Schmitt Hanson, (1860–1956) milliner, dressmaker and entrepreneur
- Bob Stinson, musician, lead guitarist for The Replacements
- Henry Wagener, Minnesota state legislator and farmer
- Maxx Williams, NFL tight end for the Arizona Cardinals, was born in Waconia
- Shane Wiskus, artistic gymnast, represented Team USA at the 2020 Summer Olympics
