= Henry Wagener =

American politician (1891–1979)

- Wagener c. 1945-1946

Member of the Minnesota Senate from the 21st district
- In office January 4, 1943 – January 2, 1955
- Governor: Harold Stassen; Edward J. Thye; Luther Youngdahl; C. Elmer Anderson

Personal details
- Born: September 4, 1891 Waconia, Minnesota, U.S.
- Died: December 6, 1979 (aged 88) Carver County, Minnesota, U.S.

Henry Wagener (September 4, 1891 – December 6, 1979) was an American businessman, farmer, and politician.

Henry Wagener was born on a farm in Waconia, Carver County, Minnesota. He lived in Waconia with his wife and family and was a farmer and farm machinery dealer. Wagener was also a well driller. He served in the Minnesota Senate from 1943 to 1954 and was a member of the Conservative Caucus. Wagener died in Carver County.
