= Church of St. Hubertus =

Historic church in Minnesota, United States

- Church of St. Hubertus--Catholic
- U.S. National Register of Historic Places
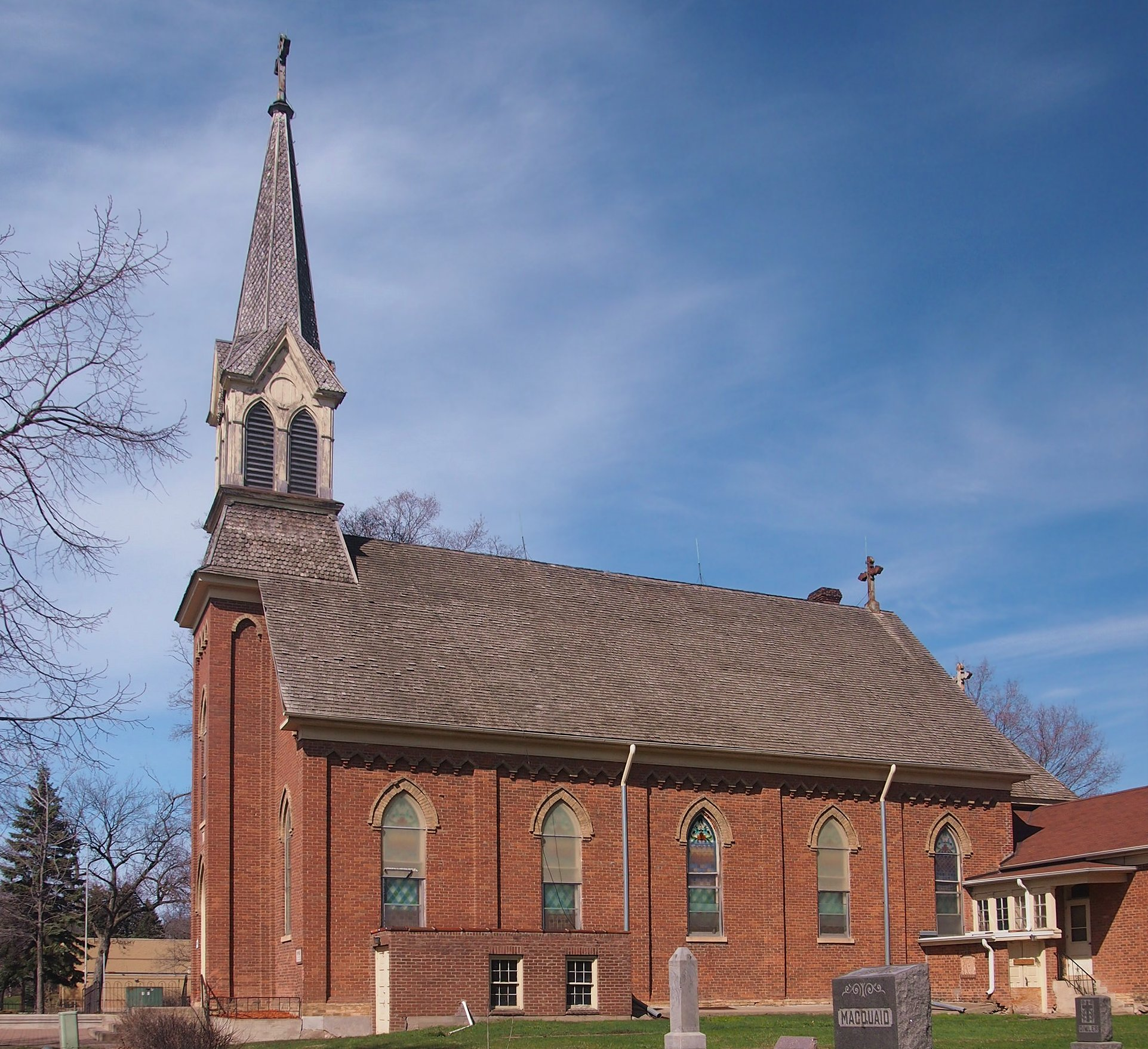
- The Church of St. Hubertus from the south-southwest

- Location within Minnesota Location within the United States
- Location: Great Plains Blvd., and W. 78th St., Chanhassen, Minnesota
- Coordinates: 44°51′43″N 93°31′51″W
- Area: less than one acre
- Built: 1887
- Built by: John Geiser
- NRHP reference No.: 82002937
- Added to NRHP: March 19, 1982

The Church of St. Hubertus is a historic Catholic church in Chanhassen, Minnesota, United States, built in 1887. It was listed on the National Register of Historic Places in 1982 for having local significance in the themes of "community planning and development" and "exploration/settlement". It was nominated for symbolizing the Franciscan brotherhood that platted and grew the German Catholic settlement that became Chanhassen.

The town itself was first named St. Hubertus before it became Chanhassen. The congregation was established by Father Aloysius Wewer in 1877. The 1887 building was actually the third building used by the congregation. It was built by John Geiser (1812–1902), who also carved the altar and built about 30 other churches in his lifetime. The parish built its fourth church building in 1976, then built its present building in 1997.

== 2025 proposition ==
As of late 2025 the church held a town hall meeting which would convene to decide the fate of the historical parish and its future. There were only two major options available; demolition or a full restoration of the historic property.

== See also ==
- List of Catholic churches in the United States
- National Register of Historic Places listings in Carver County, Minnesota
