= Norwood Methodist Episcopal Church =

Historic church in Minnesota, United States

- U.S. National Register of Historic Places
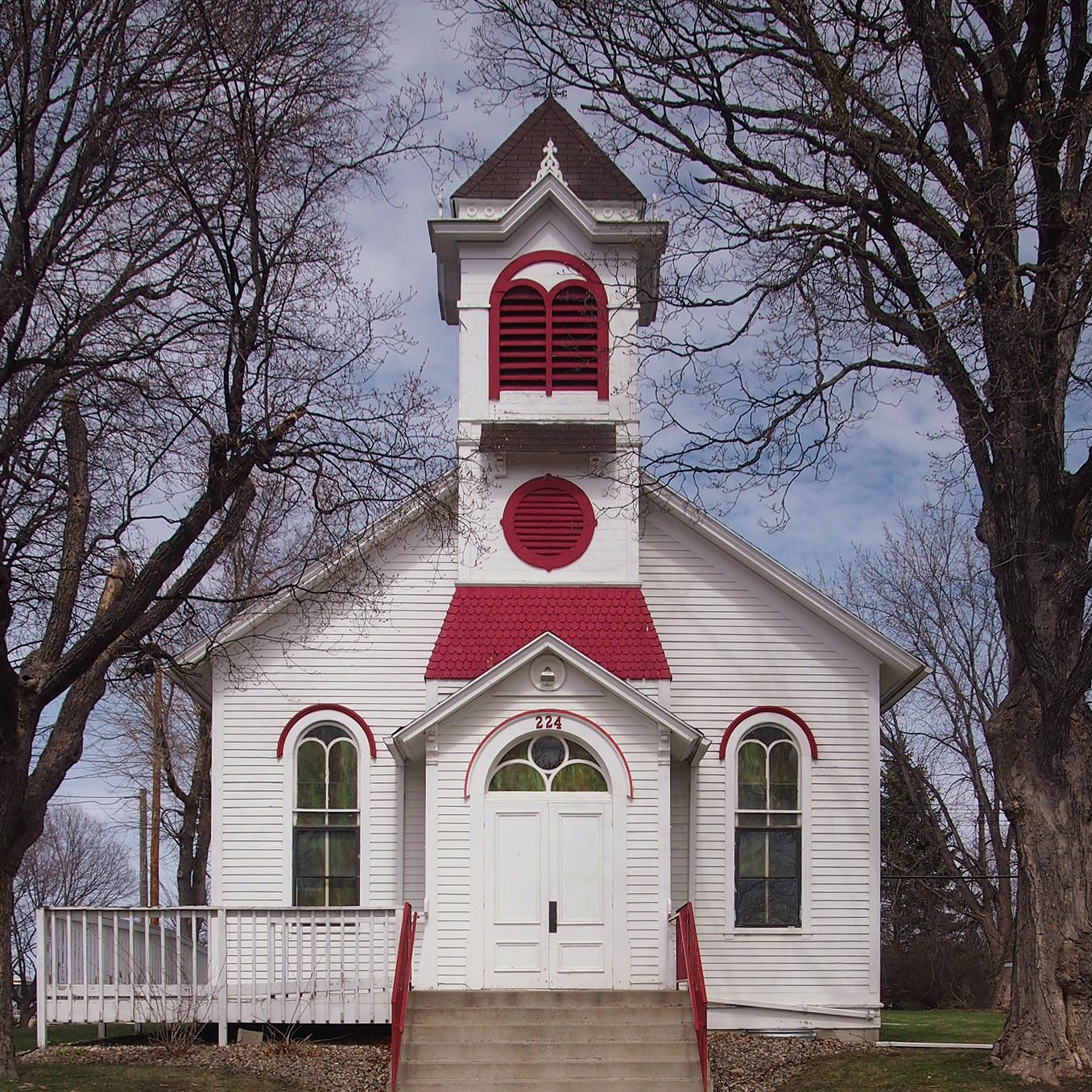
- Norwood Methodist Episcopal Church from the south

- Location within Minnesota Location within the United States
- Location: 224 Hill Street, Norwood, Minnesota
- Coordinates: 44°46′13.5″N 93°55′41″W
- Area: less than one acre
- Built: 1876
- Architect: James Slocum, Jr.
- MPS: Carver County MRA
- NRHP reference No.: 80001978
- Added to NRHP: January 4, 1980

Norwood Methodist Episcopal Church, also known as the Church in the Maples, is a historic church in Norwood Young America, Minnesota, United States. The building is in the Romanesque style, which was popular for public buildings in Minnesota but uncommon in Carver County. It has semicircular door and window openings, a wheel window in the belfry, quatrefoil window sash decorations, and broad and smooth walls.

It was built in 1876 and was added to the National Register in 1980. It was listed for its distinctive architectural embellishments and connection to town founder James Slocum, Jr., who financed and built it.

The building was destroyed by fire in December 2018.
