= Johann Schimmelpfennig Farmstead =

- Schimmelpfennig, Johann, Farmstead
- U.S. National Register of Historic Places
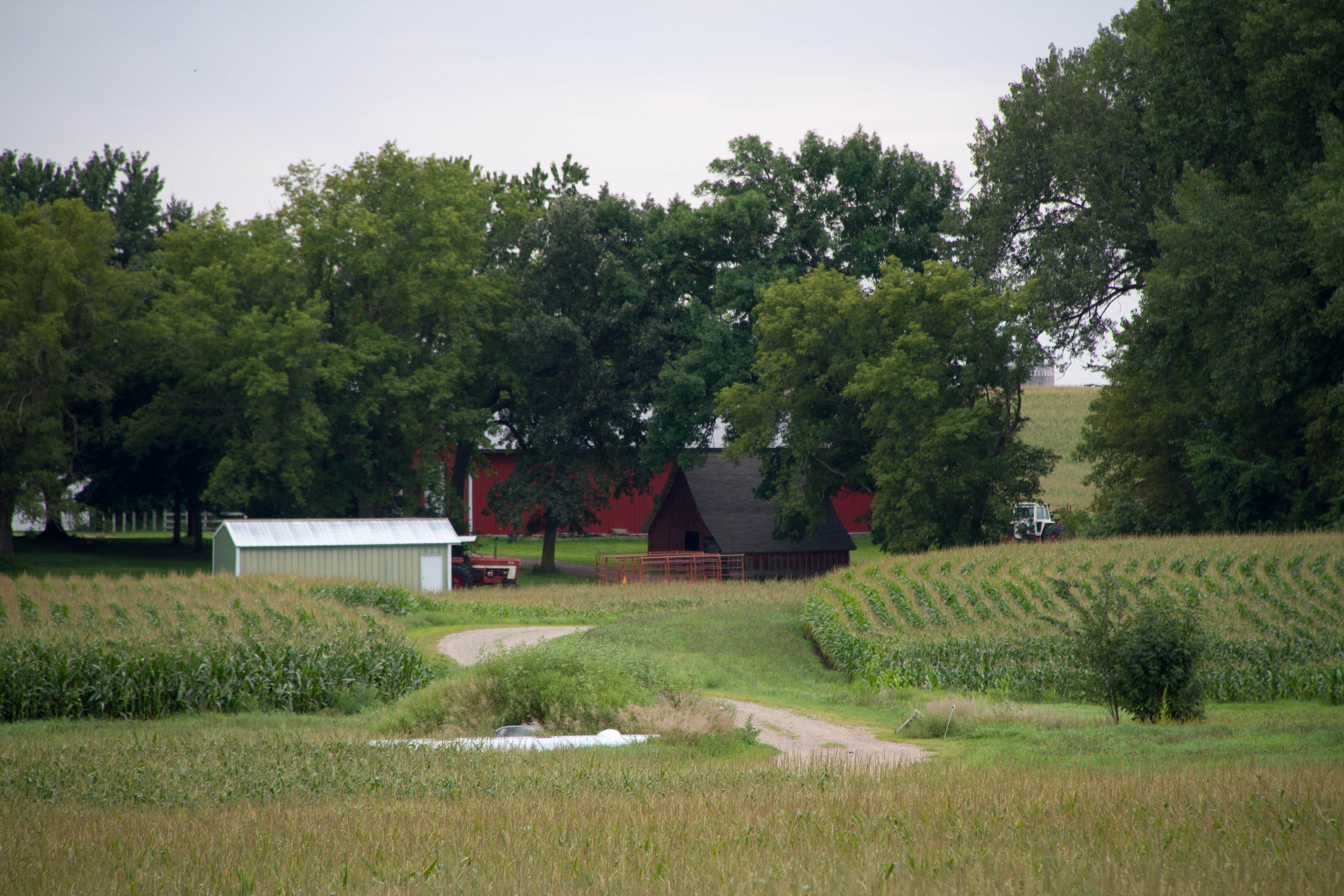

- Location within Minnesota Location within the United States
- Nearest city: Young America, Minnesota
- Coordinates: 44°46′39″N 93°52′39″W
- Area: 2 acres (0.81 ha)
- Built: 1856
- Built by: Schimmelpfennig, Johann; Et al.
- MPS: Carver County MRA
- NRHP reference No.: 80001980
- Added to NRHP: January 4, 1980

The Johann Schimmelpfennig Farmstead is a farm in Benton Township, Carver County, Minnesota listed on the National Register of Historic Places. The log and wood-framed buildings, built between 1856 and 1909, demonstrate the evolution of Minnesota farmsteads during that era.

== History ==
Johann Schimmelpfennig, his wife Albertina, and his children emigrated to the United States in 1855 or 1856 from Bremen, now part of Germany. They homesteaded a quarter-section in Benton Township and built a log house in 1856. The original subsistence farm included the house, a barn, and a smaller hog barn, all of log construction. Johann expanded the farmstead in the 1870s by building a wood-frame addition onto the house, which was a common pattern throughout the county as farmers became more prosperous. He also built a detached summer kitchen and a larger barn. Also, as agricultural patterns shifted from subsistence and cash crops to livestock and dairy construction, family members accommodated this shift by building a much larger livestock barn in 1909, also of wood-frame construction.
