= Chaska Historical Marker =

- U.S. National Register of Historic Places
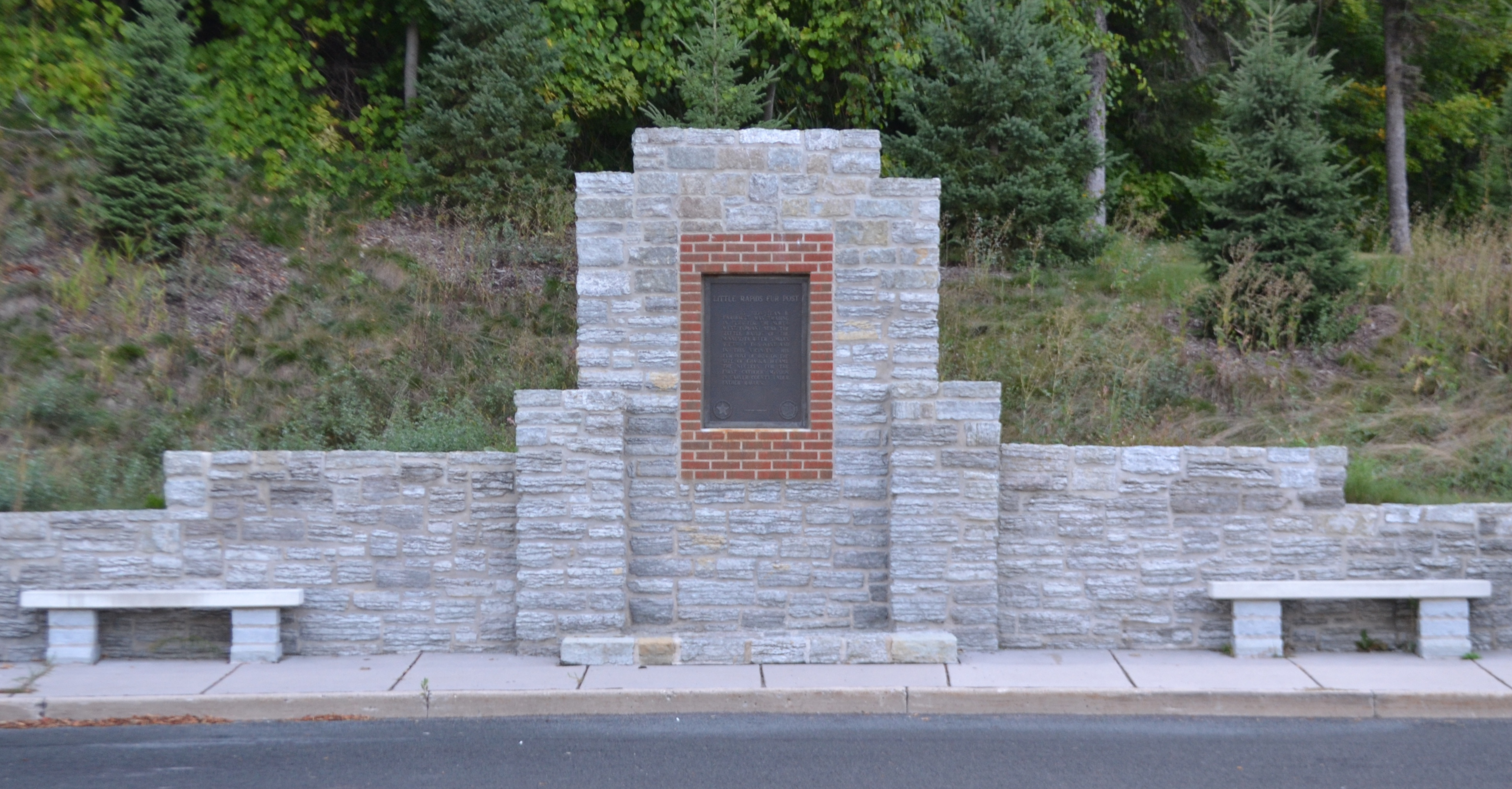

- Location within Minnesota
- Location: County Highway 61 near Edgehill Rd, Chaska, Minnesota
- Area: 1.2 acres (0.49 ha)
- Built: 1938
- Architect: Arthur R. Nichols
- Architectural style: NPS Rustic
- NRHP reference No.: 10000415
- Added to NRHP: July 6, 2010

The Chaska Historical Marker is a wayside rest that was built on the historic alignment of U.S. Route 212 in 1938 in Chaska, Minnesota. (Highway 212 has since been rerouted, and the roadway is now County Road 61.) It was built by the Minnesota Department of Highways, now the Minnesota Department of Transportation, as part of a 2,100 feet (640 m) roadside development project. The property was listed on the National Register of Historic Places in 2010.

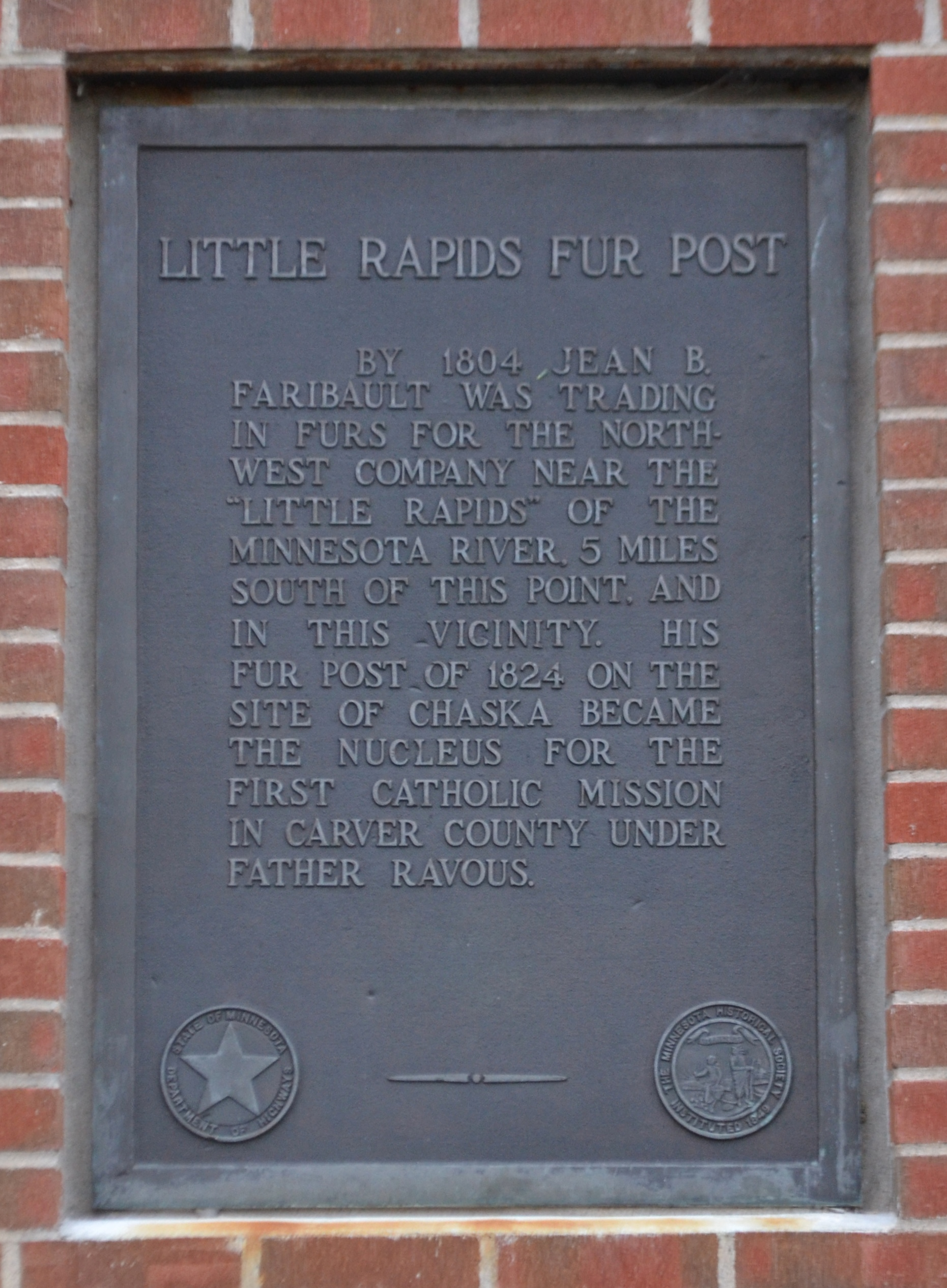
A closeup of the historical marker

The wayside rest was originally built in part to hide a gravel pit immediately north of the site. It features a 80 feet (24 m) retaining wall with a historical marker commemorating the Little Rapids Fur Post, which was operated by Jean-Baptiste Faribault about 5 miles (8.0 km) south of the wayside.

In 2009, the Minnesota Department of Transportation conducted extensive maintenance on the site. The stone structure had most of the mortar joints failing, and many pieces of limestone were broken. The plaque was also bent and covered with graffiti. Mn/DOT used the historic plans and photos to restore the site, with modifications needed for the Americans with Disabilities Act. The site is a well-preserved example of the work of Arthur R. Nichols, who designed dozens of other Minnesota Highway Department wayside rests.
