= Carver, Minnesota =

City in Minnesota, United States

Carver
- City
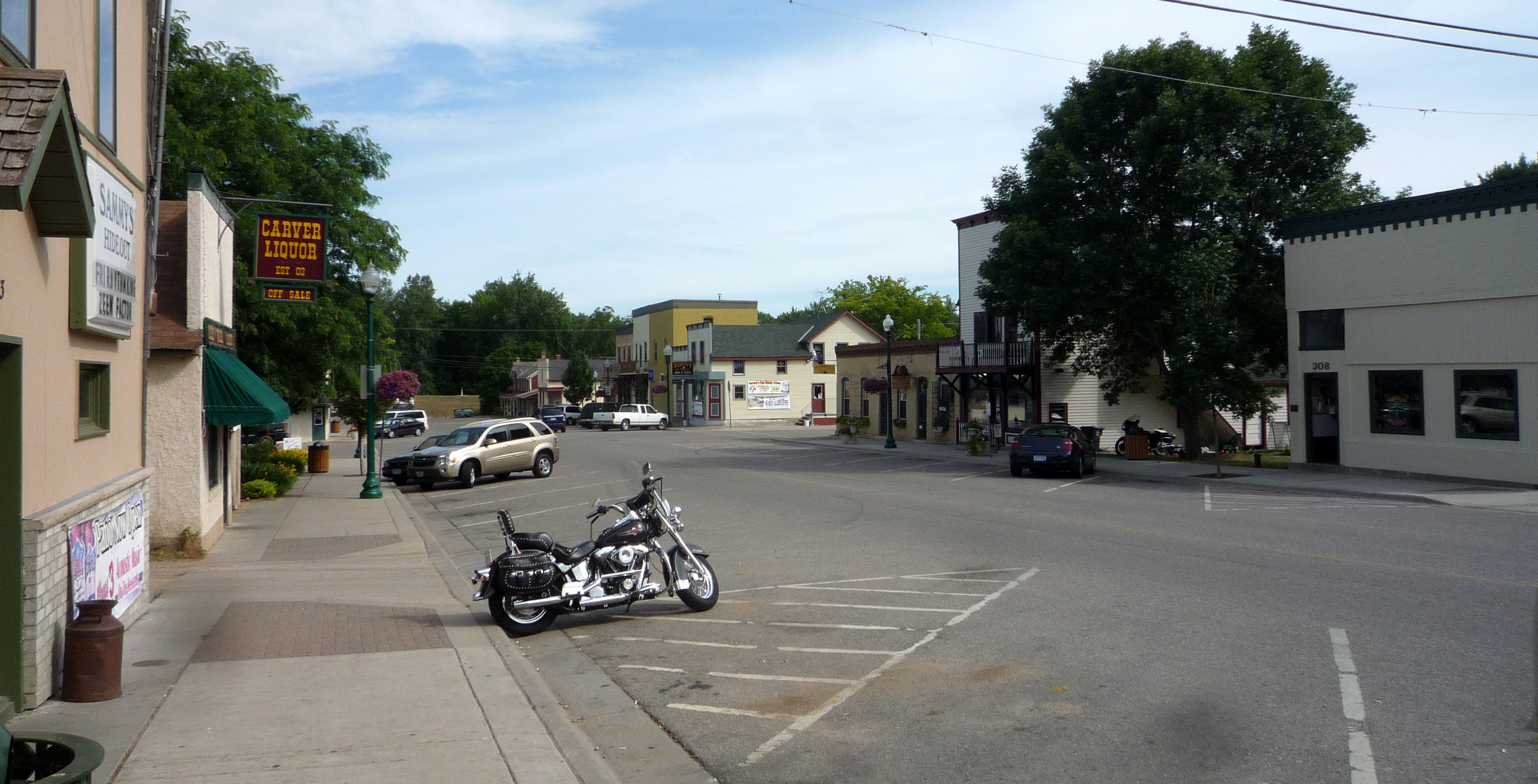
- Broadway, downtown Carver

- Location of the city of Carver within Carver County, Minnesota
- Coordinates: 44°45′38″N 93°37′56″W
- Country: United States
- State: Minnesota
- County: Carver

Area
  - Total: 4.65 sq mi (12.05 km^{2})
  - Land: 4.45 sq mi (11.53 km^{2})
  - Water: 0.20 sq mi (0.52 km^{2})
- Elevation: 837 ft (255 m)

Population (2020)
  - Total: 5,829
  - Density: 1,309.1/sq mi (505.45/km^{2})
- Time zone: UTC-6 (Central (CST))
  - Summer (DST): UTC-5 (CDT)
- ZIP code: 55315
- Area code: 952
- FIPS code: 27-10144
- GNIS feature ID: 2393762
- Website: www.cityofcarver.com

Carver is a city in Carver County, Minnesota, United States. Located along the Minnesota River, the population was 5,829 at the 2020 census. The city is named after early explorer Jonathan Carver.

== Geography ==
According to the United States Census Bureau, the city has a total area of 4.18 square miles (10.83 km^{2}), of which 4.00 square miles (10.36 km^{2}) is land and 0.18 square miles (0.47 km^{2}) is water.

U.S. Highway 212 serves as a main route in the area.

== History ==
=== Early history ===
Ten thousand years ago, the Glacial River Warren flowed through the area and left deposits of clay, sand, gravel, and fine silt soils as well as the Minnesota River. Carver and the surrounding Minnesota River Valley were occupied by a Native American, pre-Columbian Woodland Culture from approximately 1200 B.C. to A.D. 1850. In 1834, there was a Wahpeton village at the present-day location of Carver, led by Chief Mazomaini; early maps indicate it was located on either side of the mouth of Carver Creek where it meets the Minnesota River.

Pierre-Charles Le Sueur became the first European to navigate the Minnesota River, and between 1683 and 1700 made explorations of the region on behalf of King Louis XIV of France. In 1766, Jonathan Carver explored the area on behalf of the British Empire, and made maps as he searched for a western water route that flowed across North America to the Pacific Ocean. He named a small branch flowing into the Minnesota River "Carver's River", strongly correlated to the Carver Creek of today. In 1805, French trader Jean-Baptiste Faribault established the Little Rapids trading post just upriver of present-day Carver; the post, on behalf of the Northwest Fur Company, was visited by Voyageurs, Coureur des bois, Dakota Indians, and Christian missionaries.

=== Boomtown ===
The 1851 Treaty of Traverse de Sioux, signed between the Dakota and the U.S. Government, legally opened the area to white settlers. Before the Treaty was fully ratified, Axel Jorgenson, an immigrant from Fredrikshald, Norway, settled in the area by 1852 as a sooner. Jorgenson laid claim to 415 acres (1.68 km^{2}; 0.648 sq mi) that would become Carver. He called the area Lukenborg (or Luksenborg), but called it Fulton. In order to augment his barge transport business, to and from St. Paul, he opened a cheap hotel, the Hotel Luksenborg.

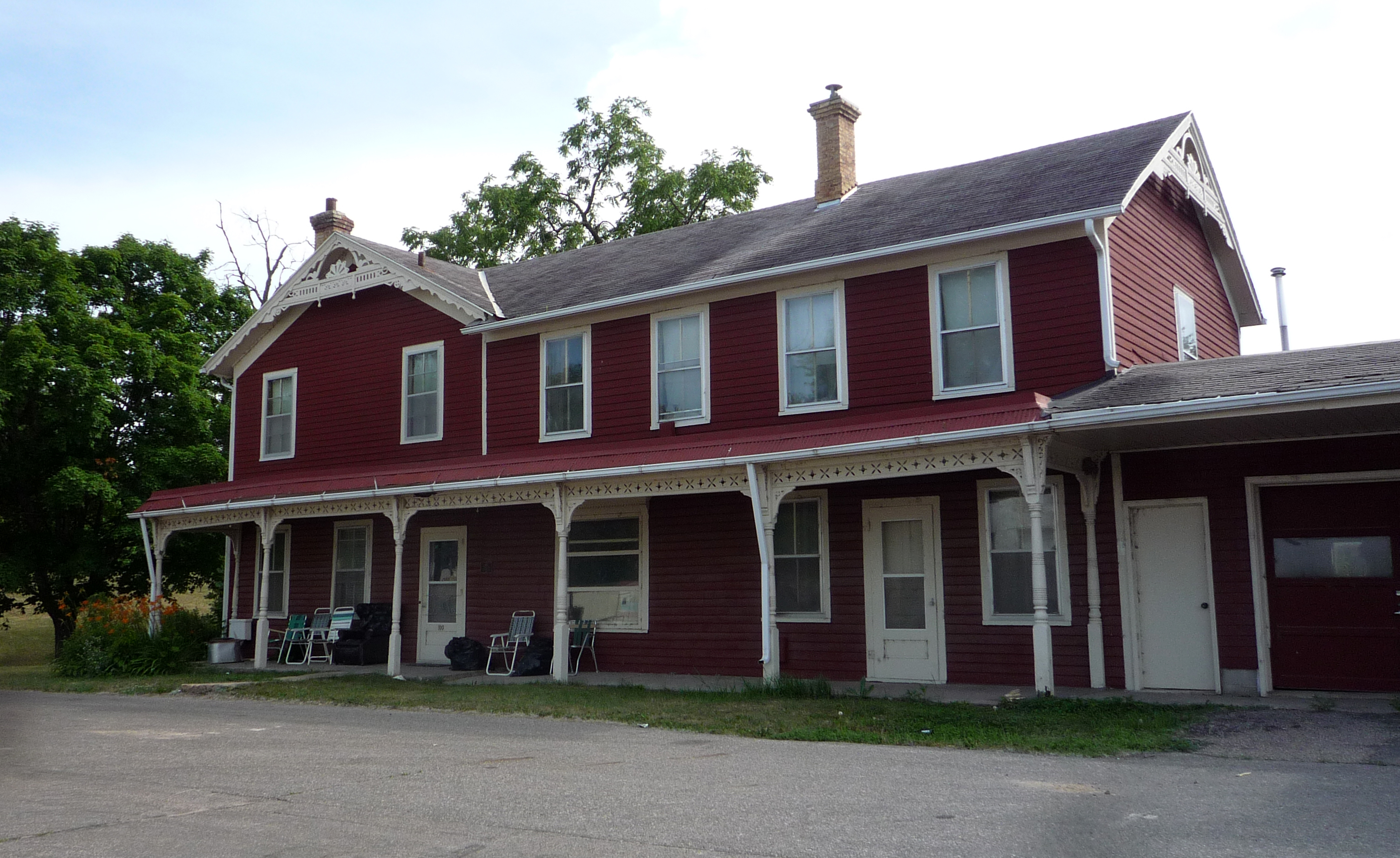
Temperance Hotel (1857)

A land boom in the 1850s led to widespread speculation along key river locations. Carver's position between navigable sections of the Minnesota River, as well as Carver and Spring Creeks, was an ideal location for a steamboat and barge terminal for transferring cargo. In 1854, Jorgenson sold his claim to the Carver Land Company, a group of seven speculators, who planned to plat and develop a town. Among the investors were Alexander Ramsey, the former Territorial Governor, and Levi Griffin, the first sheriff of Carver County. Ramsey was responsible for naming the town Carver. The Town of Carver was platted in 1857 and lots were divided up among the seven according to their investment.

By 1855, Carver already had a tailor, a hotel, a boarding house, a building designer, a carpenter, a livery stable, a blacksmith, two shoemakers, and a general store. When the town was platted in 1857, it already had 35 buildings; the school district was established the same year and was known as Minnesota School District #1 for a century. Also during this period, the steamboat The Antelope was making daily round trips between Carver and St. Paul, a one-way river run of 32 miles (51 km). Steamboats brought passengers and immigrants, who rapidly opened up the surrounding area to settlement by farmers who could buy land from the U. S. government for $1.25 an acre, as well as the supplies needed to grow these settlements.

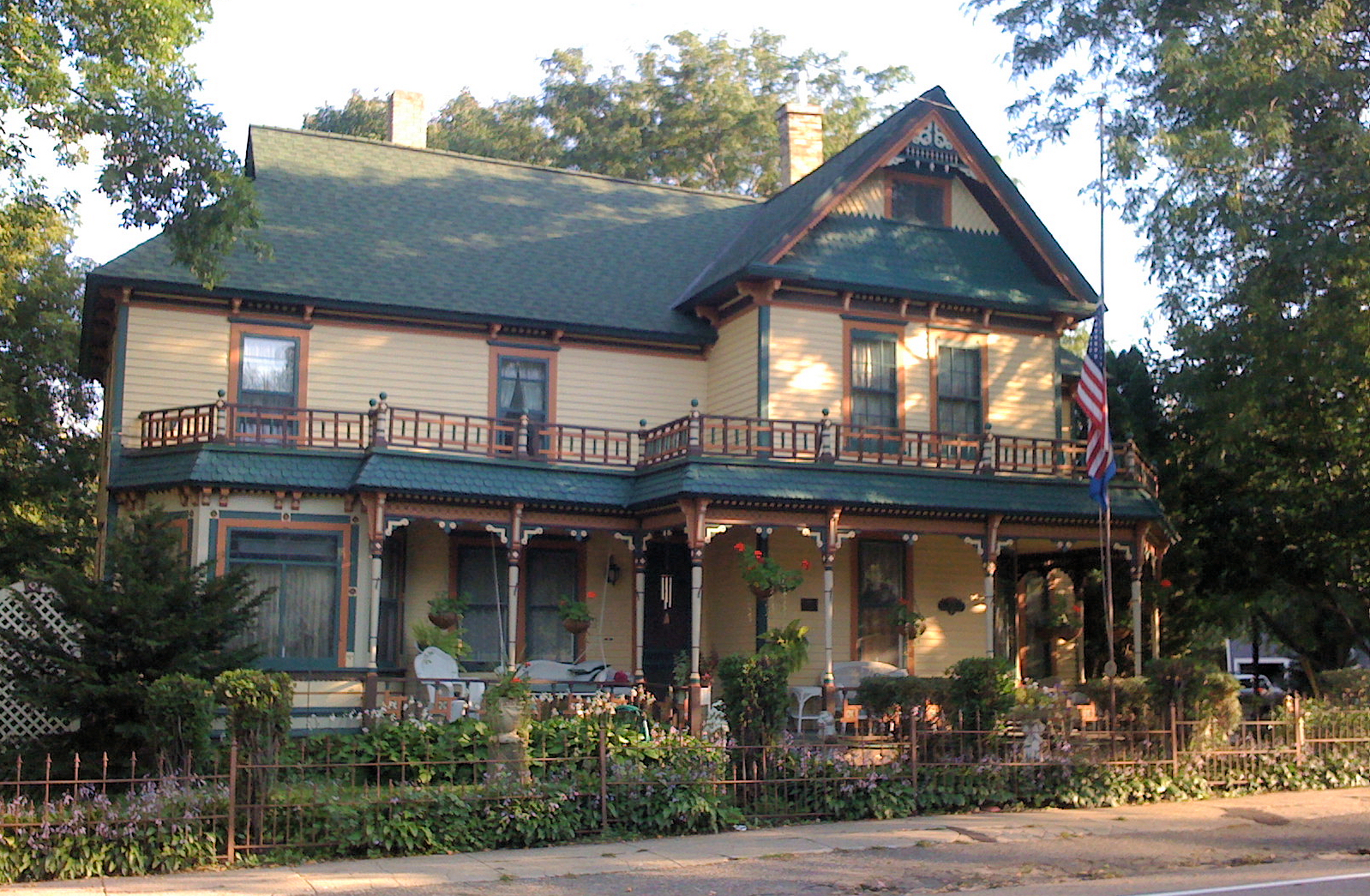
Typical residence in the historic district

The Panic of 1857 caused many frontier settlements to collapse. One such community, Louisville, located directly across the Minnesota River in present-day Louisville Township, collapsed and many of its buildings were moved to Carver. In 1858 Carver had a small gold rush when gold was purportedly found in Spring Creek. By 1860, immigrants who had previously come from the Eastern U.S. were supplanted by those from Sweden and Germany.

The Dakota War of 1862 erupted in the region as most of the regions soldiers were embroiled in the concurrent American Civil War. Between 400 and 500 pioneers in southern and western Minnesota were killed as war parties attacked settlements throughout the region. Many settlers sought refuge in Carver due to town's steamboat transportation, which offered evacuation to Fort Snelling, if needed. The town was spared, but rumors of its attack caused residents of Shakopee to flee to Fort Snelling.

=== Decline ===
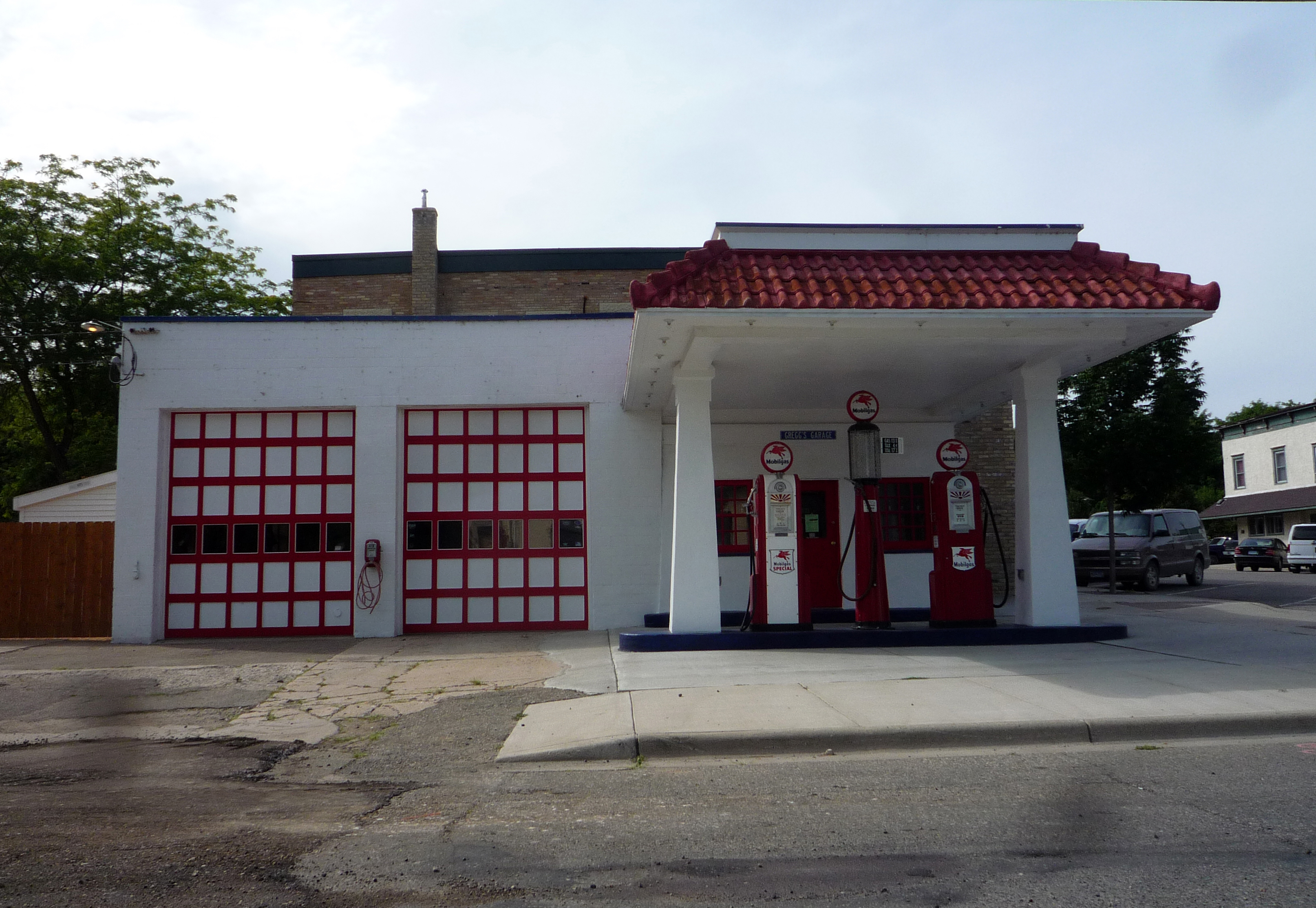
Minnesota Valley Oil Company Gas Station (1925)

The arrival of the Minneapolis and St. Louis Railway in 1871 marked the decline of Carver's importance, as cargo and passenger traffic quickly shifted to the new mode of transportation. Telegraph service quickly followed. In 1877, Carver incorporated as a village. Northwestern Bell connected the town with phone service to the Twin Cities in 1893.

Carver businesses suffered during the twin events of Prohibition and the Great Depression, causing the city to go into several decades of economic stagnation, leading to the decay of many historic houses and commercial buildings. The April 1965 flood of the Upper Mississippi River affected the lower part of old Carver and deepened the depression. The Flood Control Act of 1965 led to the creation of a floodwall to keep the Minnesota River at bay.

=== Restoration ===
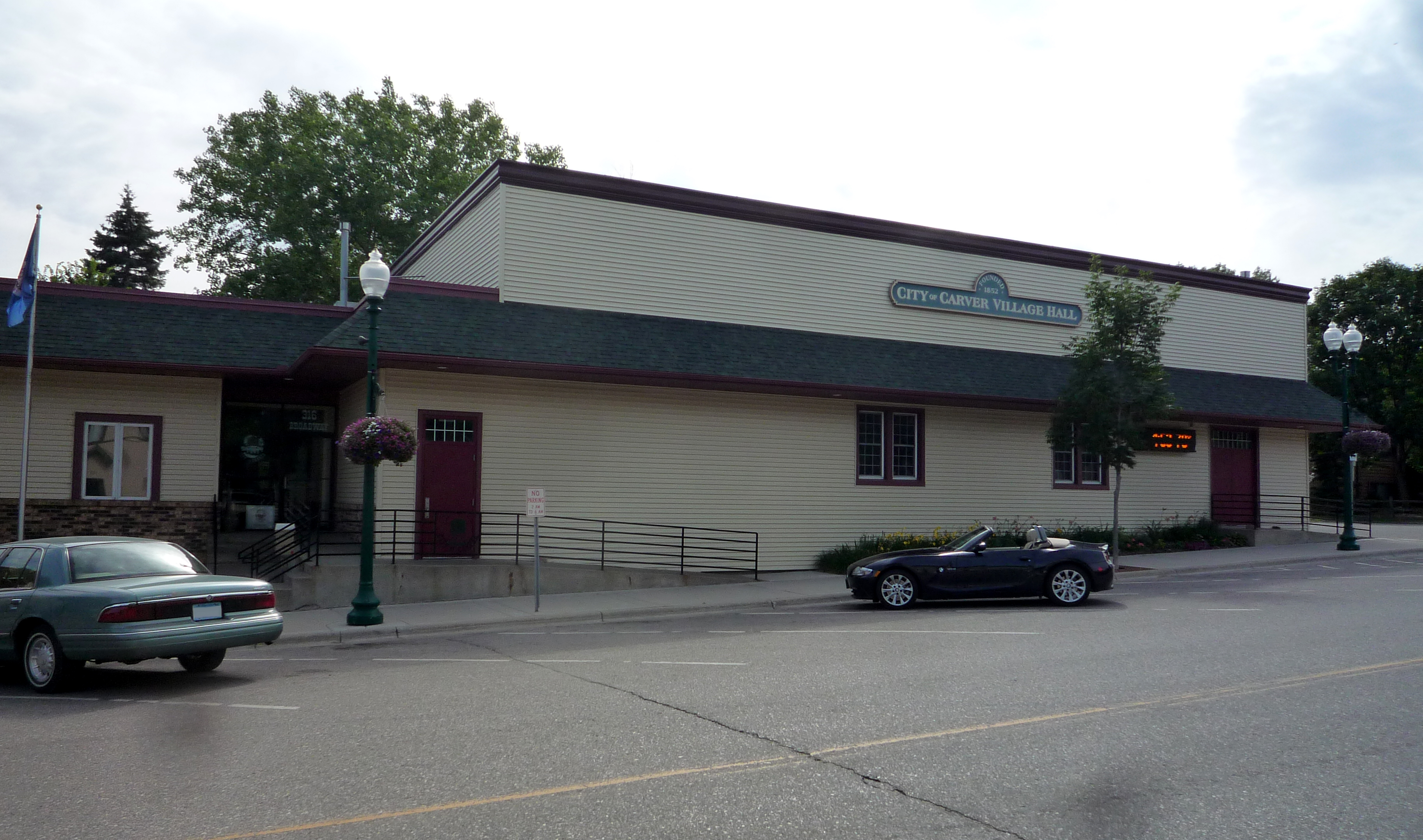
Former Carver City Hall

On June 25, 1969, Carver-on-the-Minnesota, a non-profit historic preservation organization formed to purchase, renovate and save key properties. While some progress was made during the 1960s-70s, the deaths of founding members caused the organization to stall and several important buildings were lost. The Carver Historic District was placed on the National Register of Historic Places in 1980, making it one of the first historic districts in Minnesota. The years of decline had actually helped preserve a number of important historic structures from ever being redeveloped, and the historic district includes eighty-seven buildings and four structures of commercial, religious, residential and social importance.

The City of Carver created the Heritage Preservation Commission in 1989 as a supporting group of appointees to aid the City Council and Planning Commission on historic preservation issues. In 2006, Carver attained Certified Local Government status by the Minnesota State Historic Preservation Office. In summer 2007, the White House named Carver a Preserve America Community.

== Demographics ==
Historical population
Census	Pop.	Note	%±
1860	724		—
1870	521		−28.0%
1880	683		31.1%
1890	625		−8.5%
1900	583		−6.7%
1910	571		−2.1%
1920	504		−11.7%
1930	427		−15.3%
1940	519		21.5%
1950	548		5.6%
1960	467		−14.8%
1970	669		43.3%
1980	642		−4.0%
1990	744		15.9%
2000	1,266		70.2%
2010	3,724		194.2%
2020	5,829		56.5%
U.S. Decennial Census; 2013 Estimate

=== 2020 census ===
As of the 2020 census, Carver had a population of 5,829. The median age was 35.6 years. 32.1% of residents were under the age of 18 and 7.8% of residents were 65 years of age or older. For every 100 females there were 100.3 males, and for every 100 females age 18 and over there were 97.8 males age 18 and over.

82.0% of residents lived in urban areas, while 18.0% lived in rural areas.

There were 1,848 households in Carver, of which 50.5% had children under the age of 18 living in them. Of all households, 72.1% were married-couple households, 8.7% were households with a male householder and no spouse or partner present, and 13.9% were households with a female householder and no spouse or partner present. About 11.2% of all households were made up of individuals and 3.3% had someone living alone who was 65 years of age or older.

There were 1,916 housing units, of which 3.5% were vacant. The homeowner vacancy rate was 1.0% and the rental vacancy rate was 3.4%.

Racial composition as of the 2020 census
Race	Number	Percent
White	4,930	84.6%
Black or African American	134	2.3%
American Indian and Alaska Native	5	0.1%
Asian	319	5.5%
Native Hawaiian and Other Pacific Islander	3	0.1%
Some other race	85	1.5%
Two or more races	353	6.1%
Hispanic or Latino (of any race)	225	3.9%

=== 2010 census ===
As of the census of 2010, there were 3,724 people, 1,182 households, and 984 families residing in the city. The population density was 931.0 inhabitants per square mile (359.5/km^{2}). There were 1,236 housing units at an average density of 309.0 per square mile (119.3/km^{2}). The racial makeup of the city was 89.8% White, 1.0% African American, 0.2% Native American, 6.3% Asian, 0.4% from other races, and 2.3% from two or more races. Hispanic or Latino of any race were 2.0% of the population.

There were 1,182 households, of which 55.8% had children under the age of 18 living with them, 72.9% were married couples living together, 5.4% had a female householder with no husband present, 4.9% had a male householder with no wife present, and 16.8% were non-families. 11.8% of all households were made up of individuals, and 1.2% had someone living alone who was 65 years of age or older. The average household size was 3.15 and the average family size was 3.46.

The median age in the city was 31.7 years. 36.1% of residents were under the age of 18; 5.3% were between the ages of 18 and 24; 36.1% were from 25 to 44; 19.1% were from 45 to 64; and 3.5% were 65 years of age or older. The gender makeup of the city was 50.5% male and 49.5% female.

=== 2000 census ===
As of the census of 2000, there were 1,266 people, 458 households, and 349 families residing in the city. The population density was 328.6 inhabitants per square mile (126.9/km^{2}). There were 467 housing units at an average density of 121.2 per square mile (46.8/km^{2}). The racial makeup of the city was 97.39% White, 0.24% African American, 0.24% Native American, 0.47% Asian, 0.95% from other races, and 0.71% from two or more races. Hispanic or Latino of any race were 1.66% of the population.

There were 458 households, out of which 40.0% had children under the age of 18 living with them, 66.2% were married couples living together, 7.0% had a female householder with no husband present, and 23.6% were non-families. 17.2% of all households were made up of individuals, and 3.1% had someone living alone who was 65 years of age or older. The average household size was 2.76 and the average family size was 3.13.

In the city, the population was spread out, with 29.2% under the age of 18, 6.0% from 18 to 24, 42.1% from 25 to 44, 17.0% from 45 to 64, and 5.7% who were 65 years of age or older. The median age was 33 years. For every 100 females, there were 105.5 males. For every 100 females age 18 and over, there were 104.1 males.

The median income for a household in the city was $65,083, and the median income for a family was $70,673. Males had a median income of $43,125 versus $29,408 for females. The per capita income for the city was $25,020. About 0.6% of families and 2.0% of the population were below the poverty line, including none of those under the age of eighteen or sixty-five or over.

== Politics ==
Presidential election results

Presidential elections results
Year	Republican	Democratic	Third parties
2024	47.9% 1,810	49.5% 1,870	2.6% 99
2020	46.7% 1,460	50.2% 1,569	3.1% 96
2016	49.4% 1,145	40.1% 930	10.5% 243
2012	57.1% 1,174	40.8% 838	2.1% 42
2008	55.5% 988	42.7% 760	1.8% 32
2004	60.8% 839	37.6% 518	1.6% 22
2000	53.7% 386	39.7% 285	6.6% 47

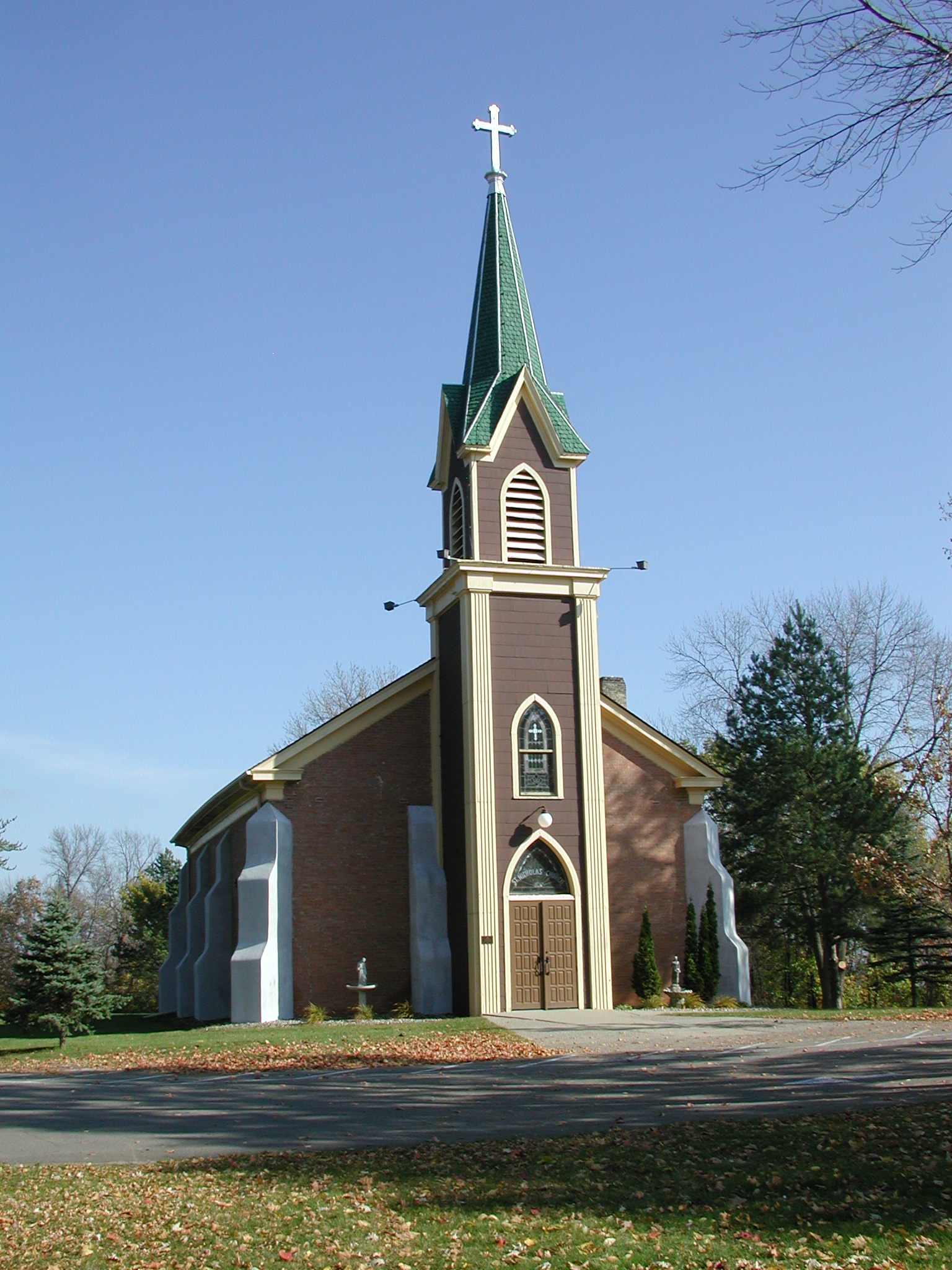
St. Nicholas Catholic Church, Carver. The view in October 2008

== Education ==
St. Nicholas Catholic Church is located in the heart of the city. While St. Nicholas does not have a Catholic School, many parochial school students attend nearby Guardian Angels Catholic School just a short distance away in nearby Chaska. East Union Elementary and Clover Ridge Elementary are popular public schools elementary students. For high school students, many attend Chaska High School. In September 2017, Carver Elementary opened providing public schooling for Elementary age students.

== Notable people ==
- William F. Badè, archeologist and scholar.
- Payton Arnold, village savant.
- Linda Hazzard, serial killer.
