= List of museums in the Twin Cities Metro region =

This list of museums in Twin Cities Metro region encompasses museums which are defined for this context as institutions (including nonprofit organizations, government entities, and private businesses) that collect and care for objects of cultural, artistic, scientific, or historical interest and make their collections or related exhibits available for public viewing. Non-profit and university art galleries are also included.

Private museums which are not regularly open to the public and virtual museums which exist only online are not included.

The Twin Cities Metro region includes the following counties: Anoka, Carver, Chisago, Dakota, Hennepin, Isanti, Ramsey, Scott, Sherburne, Washington, and Wright.

== Current museums ==
Name	Image	Town/City	County	Region	Type	Summary
1852 Town House School		Taylors Falls; 45°24′5.5″N 92°39′13.5″W	Chisago	Twin Cities Metro	Local history	The 1852 schoolhouse, the oldest public school in Minnesota. Operated by the Taylors Falls Historical Society
1914 Historic Town Hall Museum		Eagan; 44°49′6.7″N 93°10′3.5″W	Hennepin	Twin Cities Metro	Local history	Features local history displays as well as history talks and events. Operated by the Eagan Historical Society.
Afton Historical Museum		Afton; 44°54′9″N 92°46′58.5″W	Washington	Twin Cities Metro	Local history	Period displays, artifacts, and photographs of local history and agriculture, plus a research library. Operated by the Afton Historical Society in an 1868 church building.
Alexander Ramsey House		Saint Paul; 44°56′29.5″N 93°6′15.5″W	Ramsey	Twin Cities Metro	Historic house	1868 mansion of early Minnesota governor and founding figure Alexander Ramsey. Operated by the Minnesota Historical Society.
Amador Heritage Center		Almelund; 45°29′30.5″N 92°47′7″W	Chisago	Twin Cities Metro	Local history, open-air	The Amador Heritage Center was established in 1978. Local memorabilia and replica structures housed in a 1910 school, with an adjacent collection of historic buildings.
American Museum of Asmat Art		Saint Paul; 44°56′32″N 93°11′27″W	Ramsey	Twin Cities Metro	Art	Gallery on the art and culture of the Asmat people of southwestern Papua, Indonesia. Housed at the University of St. Thomas.
American Swedish Institute		Minneapolis; 44°57′18.5″N 93°15′57″W	Hennepin	Twin Cities Metro	Ethnic	Art and cultural center dedicated to Swedish and Swedish American heritage, housed in a 1908 mansion.
Ames-Florida-Stork House		Rockford; 45°5′12.5″N 93°43′54.5″W	Hennepin	Twin Cities Metro	Historic house	1861 house with period furnishings charting its ownership by three families. Operated by the Rockford Area Historical Society.
Andrew Peterson Farmstead		Waconia; 44°51′50″N 93°43′30″W	Carver	Twin Cities Metro	Agriculture	The Andrew Peterson Farmstead is a farm east of Waconia, Minnesota. Peterson worked substantially with the development of apple trees. His farm was one of the first research stations for what would become the University of Minnesota Landscape Arboretum. Owned and operated by the Carver County Historical Society.
Anoka County History Center		Anoka; 45°11′59″N 93°23′15″W	Anoka	Twin Cities Metro	Local history	Exhibits on Anoka County's history and people. Operated by the Anoka County Historical Society in a 1965 library.
Ard Godfrey House		Minneapolis; 44°59′11.7″N 93°15′20.5″W	Hennepin	Twin Cities Metro	Historic house	Oldest surviving frame house in Minneapolis, built in 1849. Preserved by the Woman's Club of Minneapolis.
Augsburg Art Galleries		Minneapolis; 44°57′56.5″N 93°14′29″W	Hennepin	Twin Cities Metro	Art	Gage Family Art Gallery, Christensen Center Art Gallery, and Student Art Gallery at Augsburg University displaying work by contemporary artists as well as students, alumni, and faculty.
The Bakken		Minneapolis; 44°56′18″N 93°16′16.5″W	Hennepin	Twin Cities Metro	Science	World's only museum and research library devoted to the medical uses of electricity and magnetism, established by pioneering biomedical engineer Earl Bakken. Housed in a 1928 mansion.
Bell Gallery		Minneapolis; 44°58′24″N 93°14′35″W	Hennepin	Twin Cities Metro	History	The Bell Gallery was moved from Wilson Library to the ground floor of the Elmer L. Andersen Library at the University of Minnesota, East Bank Campus. The gallery features exhibits on a variety of historical topics developed at Elmer L. Andersen Library.
Bell Museum of Natural History	View of the Bell Museum's main entrance	Falcon Heights; 44°59′28″N 93°11′16″W	Ramsey	Twin Cities Metro	Natural history	The state's official natural history museum, established in 1872 for research and display of the state's plants and animals. Operated by the University of Minnesota, the museum is home to world renowned wildlife dioramas, the first discovery room in North America, and state-of-the-art digital planetarium. The museum opened a new building on the U of M St. Paul Campus in 2018.
Bloomington Center for the Arts		Bloomington; 44°49′33″N 93°18′9″W	Hennepin	Twin Cities Metro	Art	Arts center colocated in Bloomington City Hall. Features two art galleries. The Inez Greenberg Gallery is the larger of the two galleries and is typically used for group shows. The Atrium Gallery is located on the upper level of the center and is used for solo shows.
Bruentrup Heritage Farm		Maplewood; 45°2′7″N 93°0′32″W	Ramsey	Twin Cities Metro	Local history	Includes 11 buildings dating back to 1891 on a 22-acre prairie. Exhibits include a display of farm equipment and exhibits on milking and of early Maplewood history, including Gladstone and the 3M corporation.
Burschville School		Corcoran; 45°7′24.5″N 93°37′31.1″W	Hennepin	Twin Cities Metro	Local history	1894 one-room schoolhouse operated by the North Hennepin Pioneer Society
Cahill School and Minnehaha Grange Hall		Edina; 44°54′38.5″N 93°20′58.6″W	Hennepin	Twin Cities Metro	Open-air	1864 schoolhouse and 1879 Grange hall used as activity space by the Edina Historical Society.
Carver County Historical Society		Waconia; 44°50′56.7″N 93°47′41.6″W	Carver	Twin Cities Metro	Local history	Contains five galleries on Carver County history, a gallery on local veterans, and a research library.
Chanhassen Historic Village Hall		Chanhassen; 44°51′42.4″N 93°31′51.6″W	Carver	Twin Cities Metro	Local history	The building, built in 1898, and owned by the City of Chanhassen recently is occupied by the Chanhassen Historical Society for use as a museum. Before that the building has housed the Chanhassen Chamber of Commerce, a library, antique store and book store in addition to being a township governmental building.
Charles H. Burwell House		Minnetonka; 44°56′29″N 93°26′53″W	Hennepin	Twin Cities Metro	Historic house	1883 Victorian house of a prominent mill manager; operated by the Minnetonka Historical Society.
Chaska History Center		Chaska; 44°47′14.5″N 93°36′6.5″W	Carver	Twin Cities Metro	Local history	Exhibits and research collections on town history. Operated by the Chaska Historical Society in an 1890 livery stable.
City of Baseball Museum		Saint Paul; 44°57′4.5″N 93°5′6″W	Ramsey	Twin Cities Metro	Local history	Located along the third-base side of CHS Field the museum showcases the evolution of the game through five eras in St. Paul. It also features a "Black Pioneers" exhibit highlighting the contributions of African-American ballplayers who were from St. Paul or played in the city.
Cokato Museum & Gust Akerlund Studio		Cokato; 45°4′31.5″N 94°11′26″W	Wright	Twin Cities Metro	Local history	Local history museum and the Upper Midwest's only surviving early-20th-century photography studio, with much of its original equipment.
Cokato Temperance Hall Museum		Cokato Township; 45°7′22.3″N 94°11′39″W	Wright	Twin Cities Metro	Local history	Now a museum, the Cokato Temperance Hall was a historic clubhouse built in 1896 to serve as an alcohol-free social center in a rural Finnish American community. Maintained by the Cokato Finnish American Historical Society.
Commemorative Air Force Minnesota Wing		South St. Paul; 44°51′40.5″N 93°1′43.6″W	Dakota	Twin Cities Metro	Military	The Commemorative Air Force Minnesota Wing is home to six aircraft, a large motor pool fleet, and a unique collection of World War II artifacts that are on display at Fleming Field in South Saint Paul.
Cycling Museum of Minnesota		Minneapolis; 45°0′48.4″N 93°14′51.5″W	Hennepin	Twin Cities Metro	Transportation	Museum on the history, impact, and future promise of cycling.
Dakota City Heritage Village		Farmington; 44°37′40″N 93°8′55″W	Dakota	Twin Cities Metro	Open-air	22 historical and replica buildings depicting a typical Dakota County village of the year 1900, plus a museum of agriculture and pioneer life; operated by a non-profit organization on the Dakota County Fairgrounds.
Denler Art Gallery		Roseville; 45°2′18″N 93°10′13″W	Ramsey	Twin Cities Metro	Art	Gallery at the University of Northwestern – St. Paul displaying work by national, local, and student artists.
Eder School House		Oakdale; 45°0′43.3″N 92°57′56.5″W	Washington	Twin Cities Metro	Education	One-room schoolhouse active 1888–1920. Moved to Oakdale Nature Preserve in 2004 and operated by the Washington County Historical Society.
Edina History Museum		Edina; 44°52′33.5″N 93°20′40.5″W	Hennepin	Twin Cities Metro	Local history	Permanent and rotating exhibits of town history, plus a research library. Operated by the Edina Historical Society.
Eidem Homestead		Brooklyn Park; 45°8′13″N 93°20′12″W	Hennepin	Twin Cities Metro	Living history	Turn-of-the-20th-century living history farm with a Victorian farmhouse, barn, and live animals. Managed by the city of Brooklyn Park.
Excelsior–Lake Minnetonka Historical Society Museum		Excelsior; 44°54′6″N 93°34′1″W	Hennepin	Twin Cities Metro	Local history	History of the south Lake Minnetonka area, including the 1893 racing scow Onawa and exhibits on the Excelsior Amusement Park in operation 1925–1974. Housed in a former train station.
Fillebrown House		White Bear Lake; 45°5′6″N 93°0′11″W	Ramsey	Twin Cities Metro	Historic house	1879 lakeside cottage, operated by the White Bear Lake Area Historical Society.
Firefighters Hall & Museum		Minneapolis; 45°0′35″N 93°15′16.5″W	Hennepin	Twin Cities Metro	Firefighting	Historical vehicles, equipment, displays, and a research library on firefighting in Minnesota.
Folsom House		Taylors Falls; 45°24′2″N 92°39′15″W	Chisago	Twin Cities Metro	Historic house	1855 house of lumber magnate W.H.C. Folsom, with many of its original furnishings. Operated by the Taylors Falls Historical Society.
Fridley History Center		Fridley; 45°5′11.8″N 93°15′19.6″W	Anoka	Twin Cities Metro	Local history	Artifacts and displays of town history. Operated by the Fridley Historical Society in a 1931 schoolhouse.
Gallery of Wood Art		Saint Paul; 44°56′44″N 93°5′50″W	Ramsey	Twin Cities Metro	Art	Exhibits a variety of contemporary art made from wood, plus educational displays and vintage lathes. Operated by the American Association of Woodturners in Landmark Center.
Gibbs Museum of Pioneer and Dakotah Life		Falcon Heights; 44°59′35″N 93°11′17″W	Ramsey	Twin Cities Metro	Open-air	1849 farmstead with original, relocated, and replica buildings, plus replica Dakota dwellings and gardens; operated by the Ramsey County Historical Society.
Gideon H. Pond House		Bloomington; 44°48′48″N 93°16′16.8″W	Hennepin	Twin Cities Metro	Historic house	1856 house with replica 1852 wing, owned by Gideon Hollister Pond, early missionary to the Dakota. Operated by the city of Bloomington in Pond–Dakota Mission Park.
Golden Valley History Museum		Golden Valley; 44°59′22″N 93°21′54″W	Hennepin	Twin Cities Metro	Local history	Permanent exhibits, research collection, and education programs. Operated by the Golden Valley Historical Society in an 1882 church.
Goldstein Museum of Design		Falcon Heights; 44°59′6.5″N 93°11′0.4″W	Ramsey	Twin Cities Metro	Art	Research collection and rotating exhibit space dedicated to applied arts such as clothing, pottery, and graphic design. Operated by the University of Minnesota's College of Design.
Gopher State Railway Museum		New Prague; 44°34′59″N 93°34′57″W	Scott	Twin Cities Metro	Railroad	Collects, preserves, restores, displays, and operates railroad equipment and artifacts. Collections include the Great Northern office car "Manitoba" which was used as a private car by James J Hill.
Gordon Parks Gallery		Saint Paul; 44°57′28.5″N 93°4′31.3″W	Ramsey	Twin Cities Metro	Art	Teaching gallery at Metropolitan State University featuring works by Gordon Parks and diverse rotating exhibits.
Grimm Farm Historic Site		Laketown Township; 44°53′5″N 93°43′1″W	Carver	Twin Cities Metro	Agriculture	1859 farm of Wendelin Grimm, who developed the first winter-hardy alfalfa in North America, enabling widespread dairy farming in the Upper Midwest. Operated by Three Rivers Park District within Carver Park Reserve.
Gustaf Anderson House History Museum		Lindstrom; 45°23′23.9″N 92°50′33.4″W	Chisago	Twin Cities Metro	Historic house	1890 house of a prosperous immigrant family, with period furnishings. Operated by the Chisago County Historical Society.
Hay Lake School and Erickson Log Home		Scandia; 45°13′54″N 92°49′13″W	Washington	Twin Cities Metro	Historic house, school	1868 homesteaders' cabin and 1896 school. Operated by the Washington County Historical Society.
Hennepin History Museum		Minneapolis; 44°57′36.5″N 93°16′21″W	Hennepin	Twin Cities Metro	Local history	Permanent and rotating exhibits on Hennepin County history. Operated by the Hennepin County Historical Society in a 1919 mansion.
Hennepin Overland Museum		Minneapolis; 44°56′2″N 93°14′8″W	Hennepin	Twin Cities Metro	Railroad	1,800-square-foot (170 m^{2}) HO scale model railroad.
Heritage Gallery		Minneapolis; 44°58′30.5″N 93°13′39.5″W	Hennepin	Twin Cities Metro	Education	Permanent and rotating exhibits on University of Minnesota students, faculty, and alumni. Housed in the McNamara Alumni Center.
Highpoint Center for Printmaking		Minneapolis; 44°56′55″N 93°17′29″W	Hennepin	Twin Cities Metro	Art	Two galleries with rotating exhibits of local, national, and international printmaking.
Historic Fort Snelling		Fort Snelling; 44°53′34″N 93°10′51″W	Hennepin	Twin Cities Metro	Military	Restored 1820s Army fort at a key river junction, associated with Native American history, the fur trade, Dred Scott, and the Dakota War of 1862. The adjacent Plank Museum and Visitor Center, housed in a rehabilitated 1904 cavalry barracks, expands the story through the World Wars. Operated by the Minnesota Historical Society.
Hanover Prairie Church and History Center		Hanover; 45°10′1.5″N 93°39′21.5″W	Wright County	Twin Cities Metro	Local history	Housed in a former United Methodist church building dating to 1885, the history center preserves regional artifacts in its lower level while offering the upper level as a multipurpose event space for meetings, weddings, and receptions. It supports community programs on 19th-century German settlement, the Crow River's iron Pratt truss bridge from 1885, and area development.
Hmong Cultural Center Museum		Saint Paul; 44°57′21.5″N 93°6′57″W	Ramsey	Twin Cities Metro	Ethnic	Run by the Hmong Cultural Center, the center also provides citizenship and English classes and classes related to the Hmong folk arts tradition.
Hmong Museum		Saint Paul; 44°58′17″N 93°2′42″W	Ramsey	Twin Cities Metro	Ethnic	The museum self-identifies as a "museum without walls" and partners with local cultural organizations to do pop up exhibits and to provide cultural programming.
Hoċokata Ti		Shakopee; 44°45′31″N 93°27′51″W	Scott	Twin Cities Metro	Native American	Hoċokata Ti [ho-cho-kah-tah-tee] is the Shakopee Mdewakanton Sioux Community's (SMSC) cultural center and gathering space for the Community's tribe members. It contains a 3,805-square-foot public exhibit, Mdewakanton: Dwellers of the Spirit Lake.
Holz Farm		Eagan; 44°47′16″N 93°6′56″W	Dakota	Twin Cities Metro	Agriculture, living history	Family farm interpreting rural life from the Great Depression to World War II. Operated by the city of Eagan.
Hooper-Bowler-Hillstrom House		Belle Plaine; 44°37′35.7″N 93°45′56″W	Scott	Twin Cities Metro	Historic house	1871 house furnished to depict three periods of Belle Plaine history—1850s–60s, Victorian Era, and early 20th century—while local memorabilia is on display in the carriage house. Operated by the Belle Plaine Historical Society.
Hopkins Historical Society Museum		Hopkins; 44°55′32.5″N 93°25′1.5″W	Hennepin	Twin Cities Metro	Local history	Local memorabilia and archival material on such topics as the Minneapolis-Moline tractor company, Czech American history, homes and businesses, and Hopkins' long-running Raspberry Festival.
Independence Town Hall Museum		Independence; 45°0′40″N 93°41′9.5″W	Hennepin	Twin Cities Metro	Local history	Pioneer-era artifacts housed in a former town hall. Operated by the Western Hennepin County Pioneer Association.
Isanti County Historical Society Heritage Center		Cambridge; 45°34′37″N 93°11′33″W	Isanti	Twin Cities Metro	Local history	Local history collections and archives, adjacent to an 1872 log cabin and other historical buildings.
James J. Fiorentino Museum		Minneapolis; 44°59′7.5″N 93°16′7″W	Hennepin	Twin Cities Metro	Technology	Also known as the Cuckoo Clock Museum, it is a museum in the North Loop neighborhood that houses a large private collection of cuckoo clocks as well as other items such as phonographs and vintage musical instruments and geologic specimens.
James J. Hill House		Saint Paul; 44°56′42″N 93°6′32″W	Ramsey	Twin Cities Metro	Historic house	Gilded Age mansion of railroad magnate James J. Hill, completed in 1891. Operated by the Minnesota Historical Society.
John H. Stevens House		Minneapolis; 44°54′50″N 93°12′35″W	Hennepin	Twin Cities Metro	Historic house	1849 house of Minneapolis pioneer John H. Stevens, site of much early civic activity. Hauled to its current location in Minnehaha Park in 1896 by teams of schoolchildren.
Julian H. Sleeper House		Saint Paul; 44°56′21.5″N 93°7′43″W	Ramsey	Twin Cities Metro	Art	Gilded Age decorative arts displayed in an 1884 home, exhibited by the owner by appointment. Collection was formerly the basis of the Gowie-Nonnand House Museum in New Haven, Connecticut.
Karl Oskar House		Lindstrom; 45°22′7.5″N 92°49′24.9″W	Chisago	Twin Cities Metro	Ethnic	Swedish pioneer home that was the inspiration for author Vilhelm Moberg's The Emigrants series. Operated by the Lindstrom Historical Society in Ki-Chi-Saga Park.
Katherine E. Nash Gallery		Minneapolis; 44°58′9″N 93°14′32″W	Hennepin	Twin Cities Metro	Art	5,000-square-foot (460 m^{2}) gallery devoted to exhibiting visual arts by local, regional, national, and international artists. Operated by the University of Minnesota Department of Art.
Khmer Legacy Museum		Saint Paul; 44°57′4″N 93°9′35″W	Ramsey	Twin Cities Metro	Ethnic	Displays and research material on Cambodian history and culture
The Landing – Minnesota River Heritage Park		Shakopee; 44°48′13″N 93°29′12″W	Scott	Twin Cities Metro	Living history	Historical buildings and living history demonstrations depicting the settlement of the lower Minnesota River Valley from the 1840s to the 1890s. Operated by Three Rivers Park District.
Landmark Center		Saint Paul; 44°56′44″N 93°5′50″W	Ramsey	Twin Cities Metro	Multiple	1902 federal courthouse restored as a cultural venue, with galleries on the history of the building as well as the AAW Gallery of Wood Art, Schubert Club Museum of Musical Instruments, and Ramsey County Historical Society Gallery.
Lawshe Memorial Museum		South St. Paul; 44°53′30″N 93°2′13″W	Dakota	Twin Cities Metro	Local history	Houses 25,000 objects and 20,000 photographs related to Dakota County history, plus an extensive research library. Operated by the Dakota County Historical Society.
LeDuc Historic Estate		Hastings; 44°43′44.5″N 92°51′7″W	Dakota	Twin Cities Metro	Historic house	Gothic Revival mansion of a Civil War quartermaster completed in 1866, restored for tours and events. Operated by the Dakota County Historical Society.
Lepak–Larson Farmhouse		Shoreview; 45°6′30″N 93°9′2″W	Ramsey	Twin Cities Metro	Local history	This 1896 Chaska brick farmhouse, a cross-wing design typical of German-Scandinavian architecture, served as an early farmstead hub occupied by multiple families. Now restored as part of a heritage site, it houses the Shoreview Historical Society offices and interprets local farming, elite retreats, and 1930s gangster lore.
Longfellow House		Minneapolis; 44°54′57.5″N 93°12′49.5″W	Hennepin	Twin Cities Metro	Historic house	A 1907 replica of Henry Wadsworth Longfellow's home in Cambridge, Massachusetts, operating as an interpretive information center run by the Minneapolis Park and Recreation Board.
Maple Grove Museum		Maple Grove; 45°7′7″N 93°25′43″W	Hennepin	Twin Cities Metro	Local history	The Maple Grove Historic Preservation Society formed the museum in the mid-1990s to preserve Maple Grove's history, memories, places, and artifacts.
Mill City Museum		Minneapolis; 44°58′43.5″N 93°15′26″W	Hennepin	Twin Cities Metro	Industry	Interactive exhibits on the Minneapolis milling industry and its connections to the Mississippi River and the city's development. Operated by the Minnesota Historical Society in the ruins of an 1880 mill.
Minneapolis College of Art and Design Galleries		Minneapolis; 44°57′25″N 93°16′29″W	Hennepin	Twin Cities Metro	Art	Several public galleries and a sculpture garden providing rotating exhibition space for student work.
Minneapolis Institute of Art		Minneapolis; 44°57′31″N 93°16′26″W	Hennepin	Twin Cities Metro	Art	Monumental art museum containing 89,000 works spanning 20,000 years and all six inhabited continents, ranging from indigenous American and African art to contemporary work, decorative arts, and a substantial Asian collection.
Minneapolis Sculpture Garden		Minneapolis; 44°58′12″N 93°17′20.5″W	Hennepin	Twin Cities Metro	Art	11-acre (4.5 ha) greenspace with 40 outdoor sculptures from the adjacent Walker Art Center's collection. Managed jointly by the Walker and the Minneapolis Park and Recreation Board.
Minnehaha Depot		Minneapolis; 44°54′51″N 93°12′40.8″W	Hennepin	Twin Cities Metro	Railroad	1875 train station in Minnehaha Park, with delicate "gingerbread" architecture and interior exhibits. Owned by the Minnesota Historical Society and operated by the Minnesota Transportation Museum.
Minnesota African American Heritage Museum and Gallery		Minneapolis; 44°59′29″N 93°18′29″W	Hennepin	Twin Cities Metro	Ethnic	The Museum's purpose is to preserve, record and highlight the achievements, contributions and experiences of African Americans in Minnesota and is carried out through exhibits, workshops and events that educate and inform the public about the history, culture, and art of African Americans in Minnesota.
Minnesota Air National Guard Museum		Saint Paul; 44°53′34″N 93°12′16″W	Ramsey	Twin Cities Metro	Military	History of the Minnesota Air National Guard, with 21 restored military aircraft from World War II to the present, ejection seats, flight simulators, engines, and weaponry, plus historical displays and documents. Operated by a non-profit on the grounds of the Minneapolis–Saint Paul Joint Air Reserve Station.
Minnesota Children's Museum		Saint Paul; 44°56′52″N 93°5′49″W	Ramsey	Twin Cities Metro	Children's	
Minnesota History Center		Saint Paul; 44°56′59″N 93°6′20″W	Ramsey	Twin Cities Metro	History	Main museum of the Minnesota Historical Society, with permanent and changing exhibits on the history of Minnesota, a research library, and event spaces.
Minnesota Masonic Heritage Center		Bloomington; 44°47′45″N 93°20′50″W	Hennepin	Twin Cities Metro	History	The Minnesota Masonic Heritage Center consists of the Col. James B Ladd Museum and the Charles W. Nelson Library. The museum is 3,700 SF in six galleries and showcases the history of Masonry in Minnesota. Operated by the Minnesota Masonic Heritage Society, formerly the Minnesota Masonic Historical Society.
Minnesota Museum of American Art		Saint Paul; 44°56′49″N 93°5′24″W	Ramsey	Twin Cities Metro	Art	Houses a 4,000-piece collection of American artwork and studio crafts, including numerous pieces by Minnesota artists Paul Manship, George Morrison, and Wing Young Huie. Currently located in the Pioneer Building.
Minnesota Newspaper Museum		Falcon Heights; 44°58′58.5″N 93°10′4″W	Ramsey	Twin Cities Metro	History	Publishes a newspaper on old press machinery as a public demonstration during the Minnesota State Fair
Minnesota Pioneer Park		Annandale; 45°15′19″N 94°6′38″W	Wright	Twin Cities Metro	Open-air	Pioneer heritage of Central Minnesota depicted through an 1884 log cabin, 1886 church, 1886 train station, 1886 caboose, 1892 town hall, replicas of a sod house and typical small town businesses, and indoor exhibits.
Minnesota State Capitol		Saint Paul; 44°57′19″N 93°6′8″W	Ramsey	Twin Cities Metro	History	1905 capitol building interpreted through tours led by the Minnesota Historical Society.
Minnesota State Fair History & Heritage Center		Falcon Heights; 44°58′53″N 93°10′34″W	Ramsey	Twin Cities Metro	History	History of the Minnesota State Fair
Minnesota Streetcar Museum		Minneapolis; 44°55′39.3″N 93°18′34″W	Hennepin	Twin Cities Metro	Transportation	Heritage streetcar organization with restored trams operating on the Como-Harriet Streetcar Line in Minneapolis and another in Excelsior, plus a collection of artifacts and documents on streetcar history in Minnesota.
Minnesota Territorial Pioneers Cabin		Falcon Heights; 44°58′45″N 93°10′15.3″W	Ramsey	Twin Cities Metro	Local history	Minnesota Territorial Pioneers, whose members trace their ancestry to the pioneers who settled in the Minnesota Territory before the state of Minnesota was admitted to the union in 1858, operate a museum during the Minnesota State Fair.
Minnesota Transportation Museum		Saint Paul; 44°57′45″N 93°5′44″W	Ramsey	Twin Cities Metro	Transportation	50 vintage train cars, classic buses, and interactive displays on regional transportation history in a 1907 roundhouse, plus various rides and tours.
Minnesota Veterinary Historical Museum		Falcon Heights; 44°58′57″N 93°11′2″W	Ramsey	Twin Cities Metro	Medical	Instruments, documents, and other memorabilia depicting the progress of veterinary medicine in Minnesota and the pioneering individuals behind it. Operated by the College of Veterinary Medicine at the University of Minnesota–St. Paul Campus.
Museum of Lake Minnetonka		Excelsior; 44°54′13″N 93°33′57″W	Hennepin	Twin Cities Metro	Maritime	Steamboat that operated on Lake Minnetonka from 1906 to 1926, when it was scuttled, but rediscovered and salvaged in 1980 and now restored for regular heritage cruises.
Museum of Russian Art		Minneapolis; 44°54′12″N 93°16′34″W	Hennepin	Twin Cities Metro	Art	North America's only museum dedicated to the art of Russia, with a core collection of 20th-century Realist paintings plus varied temporary exhibits. Housed in a 1935 Spanish Colonial Revival church building.
New Brighton History Center		New Brighton; 45°4′45″N 93°11′49″W	Ramsey	Twin Cities Metro	Railroad	An 1887 railroad depot museum of railroad artifacts, historical pictures, area maps, caboose, railroad work cart, baggage carts and mail cart, operated by the New Brighton Historical Society.
North Oaks Farm		North Oaks; 45°5′33″N 93°6′33″W	Ramsey	Twin Cities Metro	Agriculture	Preservation of the history and remaining buildings of railroad industrialist, James J. Hill's North Oaks Farm. Operated by the Hill Farm Historical Society.
North St. Paul Historical Society Museum		North St. Paul; 45°0′54.4″N 92°59′11.7″W	Ramsey	Twin Cities Metro	Local history	Promotes awareness of the area through historical artifacts.
North Star Museum of Boy Scouting and Girl Scouting		North St. Paul; 45°0′52″N 92°59′15″W	Ramsey	Twin Cities Metro	Scouting	Collection of over 150,000 items on the history of scouting in the Upper Midwest.
Northwest Airlines History Center		Bloomington; 44°51′30″N 93°13′20″W	Hennepin	Twin Cities Metro	Local history	Northwest Airlines History Center is located on the third floor of the Crowne Plaza Aire hotel in Bloomington and features exhibits that highlight the history of Northwest Airlines, which merged with Delta Air Lines.
Old Town Hall History Museum		Bloomington; 44°49′8″N 93°18′33″W	Hennepin	Twin Cities Metro	Local history	Operated by the Bloomington Historical Society.
Oliver Kelley Farm		Elk River; 45°15′27″N 93°32′16″W	Sherburne	Twin Cities Metro	Agriculture, living history	1860s working farm
Paisley Park		Chanhassen; 44°51′42″N 93°33′38″W	Carver	Twin Cities Metro	Biographical	Tours of Prince's private estate and production complex including the studios where he recorded and produced music, his private NPG Music Club, soundstage, and concert hall.
Pavek Museum of Broadcasting		St. Louis Park; 44°56′20.5″N 93°20′37″W	Hennepin	Twin Cities Metro	Technology	Vintage radio and television equipment
Pierre Bottineau House		Maple Grove; 45°8′7″N 93°26′34″W	Hennepin	Twin Cities Metro	Local history	This 1854 home, managed by Three Rivers Park District, interprets the life of a Métis fur trader and early settler whose work connected Indigenous and European communities in Minnesota's territorial era.
Plymouth History Museum		Plymouth; 45°1′19.5″N 93°27′42.5″W	Hennepin	Twin Cities Metro	Local history	Housed in the former 1885 Plymouth Town Hall, the museum offers local history displays and maintains an archive of local history objects and documents. Operated by the Plymouth Historical Society.
Purcell-Cutts House		Minneapolis; 44°57′33.3″N 93°18′3″W	Hennepin	Twin Cities Metro	Historic house	1913 Prairie School style house, operated by the Minneapolis Institute of Arts
Ramsey County Historical Society Gallery		Saint Paul; 44°56′45″N 93°5′49.5″W	Ramsey	Twin Cities Metro	Local history	Located in the North Lobby of the Landmark Center
Richfield History Center and Bartholomew House Museum		Richfield; 44°52′40″N 93°17′18″W	Hennepin	Twin Cities Metro	Local history, historic house	Offers local history displays and tours of the city's oldest house, built in 1852 for Riley Bartholomew. Operated by the Richfield Historical Society.
Robbinsdale Historical Museum		Robbinsdale; 45°1′52″N 93°20′31″W	Hennepin	Twin Cities Metro	Local history	In 1998 the Robbinsdale Historical Society moved into the old Robbinsdale Library building. The museum showcases an array of artifacts, photographs, and documents telling the story of Robbinsdale.
Rush City Museum		Rush City; 45°41′6.7″N 92°57′57″W	Chisago	Twin Cities Metro	Local history	The museum features exhibits on the county's history, including its early settlement by Swedish immigrants, its agricultural past, and the development of resort communities around Chisago Lakes. Former home to the North Chisago Historical Society before merger with the Chisago Historical Society.
Schubert Club Museum of Musical Instruments		Saint Paul; 44°56′44″N 93°5′50″W	Ramsey	Twin Cities Metro	Music	Located in the Landmark Center, historic music instruments, letters and other documents of music history
Science Museum of Minnesota		Saint Paul; 44°56′33″N 93°5′55″W	Ramsey	Twin Cities Metro	Science	
Sherburne History Center		Becker; 45°24′51″N 93°53′25″W	Sherburne	Twin Cities Metro	Local history	
Sibley Historic Site		Mendota; 44°53′16″N 93°9′58″W	Dakota	Twin Cities Metro	Historic house	American Fur Company trading post, homes of Henry Hastings Sibley and Jean-Baptiste Faribault, operated by the Dakota County Historical Society
Somali Museum of Minnesota		Minneapolis; 44°56′55″N 93°15′11″W	Hennepin	Twin Cities Metro	Ethnic	Somali and East African heritage
Stans Historical Museum		Shakopee; 44°47′48″N 93°31′39″W	Scott	Twin Cities Metro	Local history	Permanent and rotating exhibits on Scott County history, including the Dakota people and Shakopee-born government official Maurice Stans, and the 1908 Stans home. Operated by the Scott County Historical Society.
Stone House Museum		Marine on St. Croix; 45°12′0.4″N 92°46′17.8″W	Washington	Twin Cities Metro	Local history	Local artifacts housed in an 1872 building constructed as a town hall and jail.
Twin City Model Railroad Museum		Saint Paul; 44°57′39″N 93°11′8″W	Ramsey	Twin Cities Metro	Railroad	
Two Rivers Gallery		Minneapolis; 44°57′47″N 93°15′9″W	Hennepin	Twin Cities Metro	Art, Native American	Operated in the Minneapolis American Indian Center the gallery provides a space for emerging Native artists to exhibit work.
Walker Art Center		Minneapolis; 44°58′5″N 93°17′19″W	Hennepin	Twin Cities Metro	Art	Contemporary art museum with adjacent Minneapolis Sculpture Garden
Warden's House Museum		Stillwater; 45°3′42″N 92°48′27″W	Washington	Twin Cities Metro	Historic house	Turn-of-the-20th-century home used by 13 prison wardens from 1853 to 1914, operated by the Washington County Historical Society
Washington County Courthouse		Stillwater; 45°3′6″N 92°48′27″W	Washington	Twin Cities Metro	Historic site	Tours by appointment or self-guided
Washington County Heritage Center		Stillwater; 45°2′20.5″N 92°49′18″W	Washington	Twin Cities Metro	Local history	Features exhibits on local history, and logging. Explores both the history of Stillwater and the broader story of Washington County and the St. Croix Valley.
Wayzata Depot		Wayzata; 44°58′11.5″N 93°30′59″W	Hennepin	Twin Cities Metro	Railroad	Operated by the Lake Minnetonka Historical Society.
Weisman Art Museum		Minneapolis; 44°58′23″N 93°14′14″W	Hennepin	Twin Cities Metro	Art	Art museum with permanent collections of American modernism, Koren furniture, and Mimbres pottery. Operated by the University of Minnesota in a 1993 building designed by Frank Gehry.
West Riverside School Museum		Cambridge; 45°34′59″N 93°14′44″W	Isanti	Twin Cities Metro	Open-air	Operated by the Isanti County Historical Society, includes restored 20th century schoolhouse, 1859 Edblad Pioneer Log Home
West Hennepin History Center		Long Lake; 44°59′14″N 93°34′24″W	Hennepin	Twin Cities Metro	History	Located in the Western Hennepin County Pioneer Building, a former school building, the museum has four main display rooms – Victorian Room, General Store Room, Textile Room and Music Room. The lower level contains their archives. Operated by the Western Hennepin County Pioneers Association.
Westonka History Museum		Mound; 44°56′4″N 93°39′35″W	Hennepin	Twin Cities Metro	Local history	The museum occupies levels 4 & 5, in the Centennial Building, the museum offers local histories of the Minnetrista, Mound, Spring Park, Navarre/Orono, and Minnetonka Beach communities as well as a history of the Tonka Toys Corporation, formerly in Mound, MN. Operated by the Westonka Historical Society.
White Bear Lake Armory Museum		White Bear Lake; 45°5′6″N 93°0′38″W	Ramsey	Twin Cities Metro	Military	The White Bear Lake Armory is the site of the White Bear Lake Area Historical Society offices and Resource Library. The armory was built in 1922 and listed in the National Register of Historic Places.
White Bear Lake Depot Museum		White Bear Lake; 45°5′6″N 93°0′38″W	Ramsey	Twin Cities Metro	Railroad	Contains exhibits of railroad and local history by the White Bear Lake Area Historical Society.
White Bear Town Hall Museum		White Bear Lake; 45°5′38.5″N 93°3′4″W	Ramsey	Twin Cities Metro	Local history	The White Bear Town Hall was designed in 1885 by architect Cass Gilbert and served as the center of government for White Bear Township until 2011. Since then it has undergone a rehabilitation project and is now a museum operated by the White Bear Lake Area Historical Society.
Woodbury Heritage House and Gardens		Woodbury; 44°54′17″N 92°56′36″W	Washington	Twin Cities Metro	Local history	Built in 1870 it is one of the oldest structures still standing in Woodbury. It is operated by the Woodbury Heritage Society. The gardens contain over 100 different kinds of plants including those grown on farms by the early settlers of Woodbury.
The Works		Bloomington; 44°49′38″N 93°17′11″W	Hennepin	Twin Cities Metro	Science	Technology, engineering and hands-on science
Wright County Heritage Center		Buffalo; 45°12′19″N 93°51′48″W	Wright	Twin Cities Metro	Local history	Features a museum, research library, and historic structures that tell the story of the county's past. Operated by the Wright County Historical Society

== See also ==
- List of museums in the United States
