= Carver County Historical Society =

Historical society for Carver County, Minnesota, located in Waconia

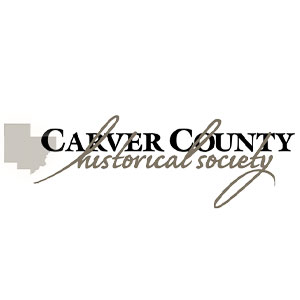

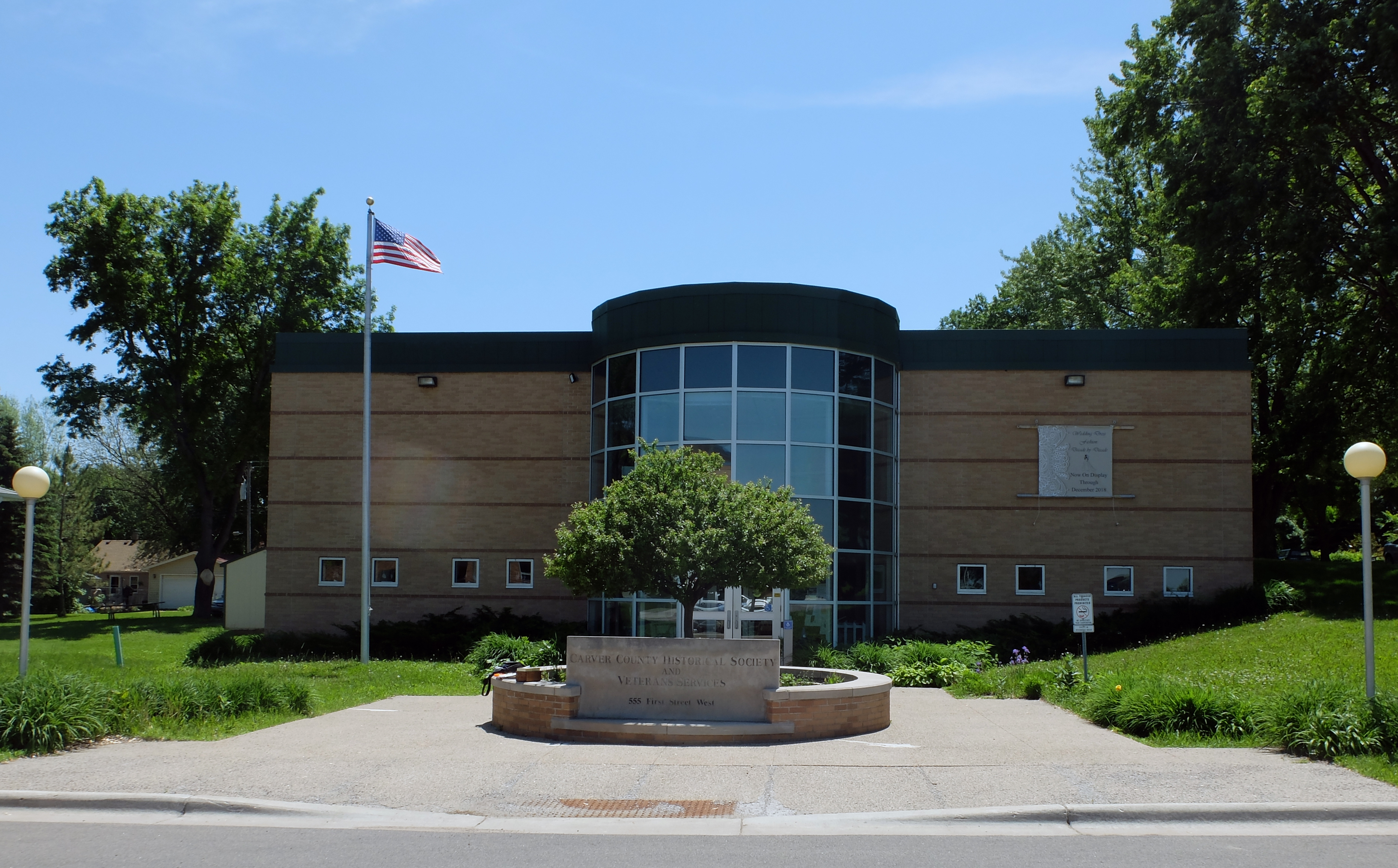
- Exterior of the museum
- Established: April 1940
- Location: 555 West 1st Street, Waconia, Minnesota 55387, United States
- Coordinates: 44°50′57″N 93°47′42″W
- Type: Local history
- Director: Wendy Peterson Biorn
- Curator: Jeremy Murray
- Website: https://www.carvercountyhistoricalsociety.org/

The Carver County Historical Society (CCHS), also called the Carver County Historical Society and Veterans Center, is a historical society and museum located in Waconia, Minnesota. The CCHS is one of the leading historical organizations within Carver County, Minnesota alongside several smaller city-level historical organizations including both the Chanhassen Historical Society and the Chaska Historical Society. As a nonprofit organization, the CCHS works heavily in historic preservation for local historical buildings of interest including several buildings on the National Register of Historic Places such as the Andrew Peterson Farmstead and the Wendelin Grimm Farmstead among others.

== History ==
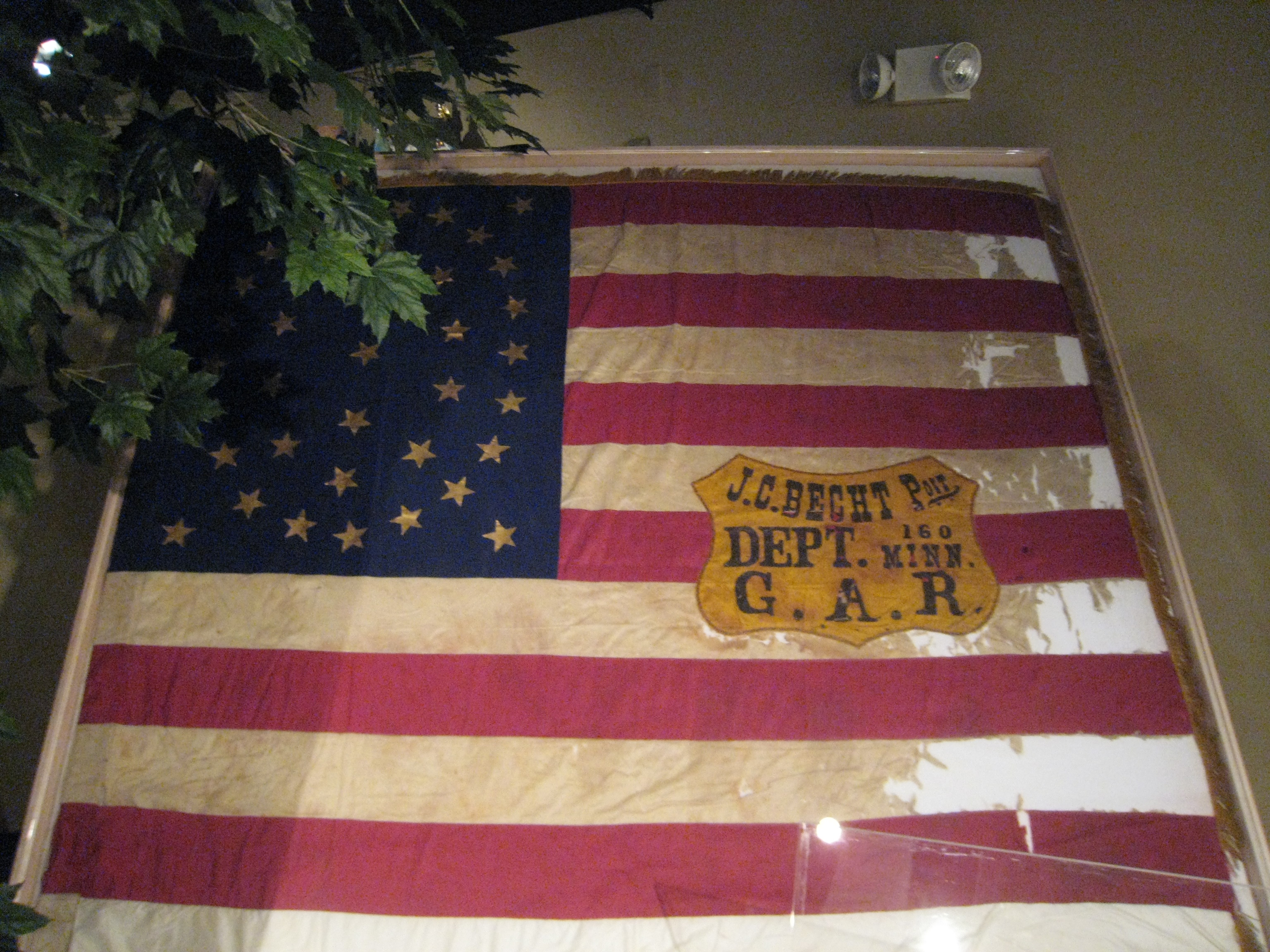
A Carver County post flag for the Grand Army of the Republic Post 160 named after Major John C. Becht of the 5th Minnesota Infantry Regiment housed at the CCHS's Veterans Gallery

The Carver County Historical Society was originally founded in Mayer, Minnesota by Otto Dietrich Sell (1875–1960), a resident of Laketown Township. Sell was the son of German American immigrants and a businessman in the textile industry. In April, 1940 Sell called for an organizational meeting and chartered the first historical society in Carver County with a total of 32 members. The mission statement of the society was to collect and preserve the history of Carver County and Minnesota, later the addition of Minnesota was dropped. The charter was ratified by the Carver County Board of Commissioners on December 12, 1940.

The CCHS began with one object housed on the second floor of the public school in Mayer. With the collection growing and desiring a central location, the CCHS moved its collection to the Waconia High School in July 1944. By 1947, the collection again had to be moved due to lack of space. This time it moved into two large rooms on the second floor of the Waconia City Hall.

As the CCHS grew, so did the desire for a permanent home. A grass roots effort began to build the Society a home which would also house the Waconia Veterans Administration. On July 14, 1959, the Carver County Commissioners approved the erection of the “Carver County Memorial Building”. O.D. Sell did not live to see the building open, as he died on March 2, 1960. His son, Elmer Sell oversaw the move and construction of the new facility where the museum still stands today.

== Museum ==
The museum inside the CCHS houses five major exhibits including an exhibit on indigenous history, European and colonial settlement, local county history, military history, and state history. The museum, archive, and research library collect and curate a variety of artifacts including 3D artifacts, weapons, textiles, photographs, archival materials, and archeological artifacts.

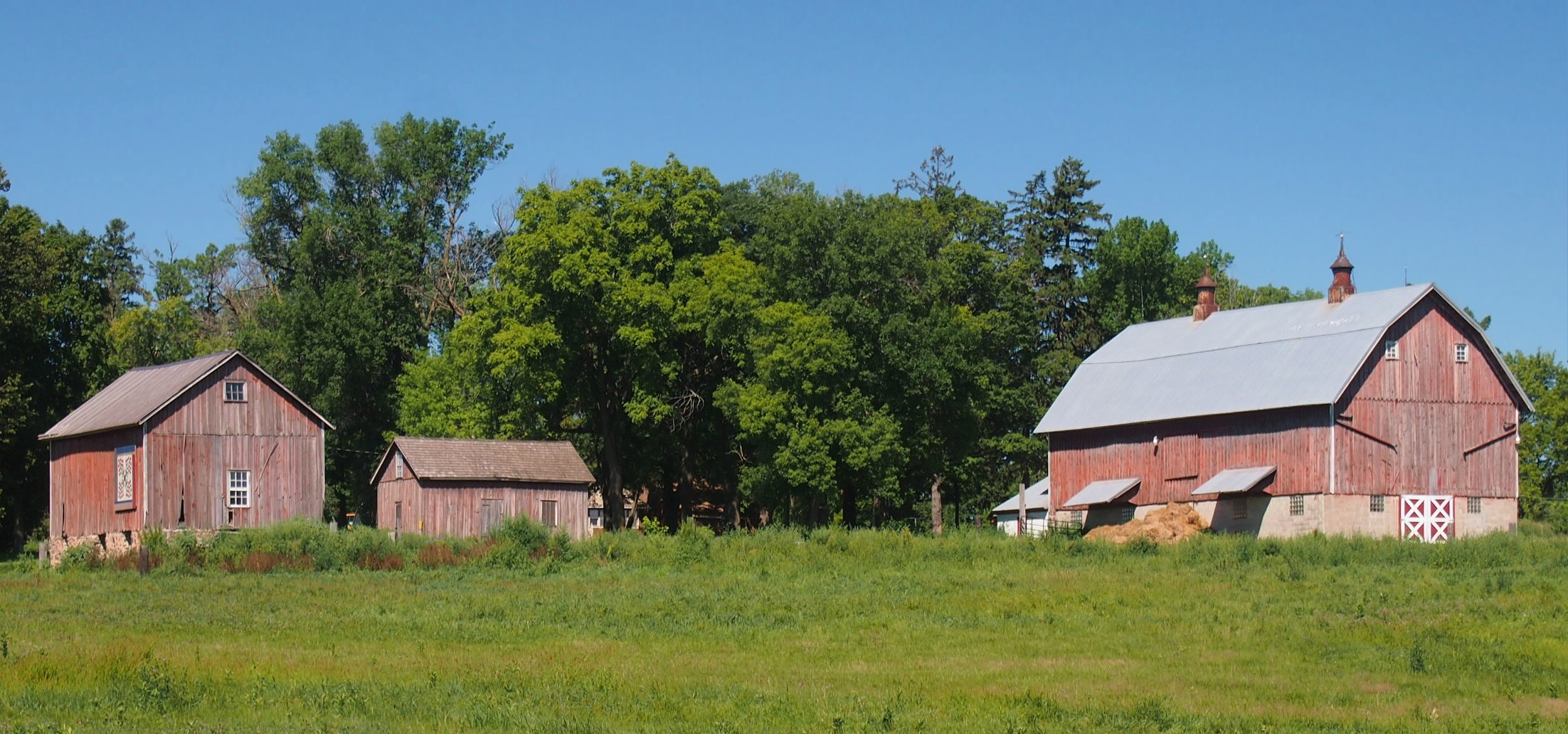
The Andrew Peterson Farmstead in the summer

Besides preserving local city and county-level history the CCHS also owns the Andrew Peterson Farmstead, a local property which was owned by the local county farmer Andrew Peterson. The CCHS has made various contributions towards the Minnesota Digital Library which is headed by the University of Minnesota.

== See also ==
- Jonathan Carver
- Andrew Peterson Farmstead
- Andrew Peterson
- Waconia, Minnesota
- Carver County, Minnesota
