= Scandia Baptist Church =

Historical church in Minnesota

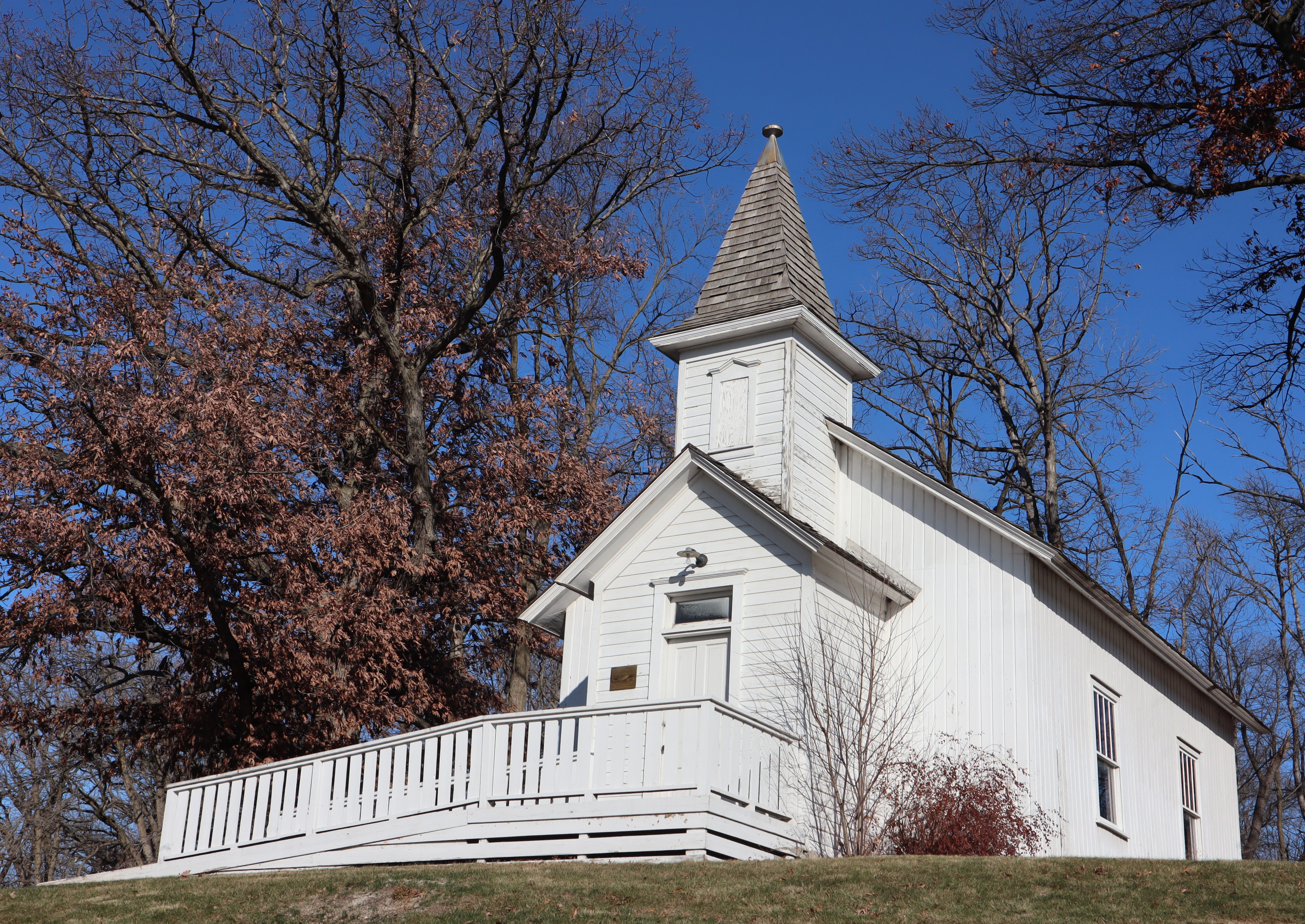
- Historic Scandia Baptist Church at Bethel University

- Location within Minnesota Scandia Baptist Church (the United States)

General information
- Type: Church
- Location: 3949 Bethel Drive, Arden Hills, MN 55112, Arden Hills, Minnesota (originally Waconia, Minnesota), United States of America
- Coordinates: 45°03′39″N 93°09′45″W
- Year built: 1857
- Owner: Bethel University

Scandia Baptist Church is a historical Baptist parish church located in Ramsey County, Minnesota. The church was originally located in Waconia, Minnesota until 1973 when it was moved to the Bethel University campus in Arden Hills, Minnesota.

== History ==
The Scandia Baptist Church was first organized on August 1, 1855 near Clear Water Lake, Minnesota (modern day Waconia, Minnesota). The settlement built up around the church became known as Scandia as well which is now a ghost town. Fredrik Olaus Nilsson was one of the first settlers of Scandia and served as the parish's first pastor. Nilsson was later a key figure in the Baptist movement in early Minnesota history. As a formal parish did not yet exist, Baptist meetings were held at the Andrew Peterson Farmstead owned by the Swedish immigrant Andrew Peterson who was also a founder of the Scandia congregation. The church itself was erected later in 1857 near Lake Waconia, the church was sided in 1875, a steeple and entrance were added in 1910 before the church was moved to the Bethel Baptist Seminary in 1973.

== Cemetery ==
The Scandia Baptist Cemetery is located in Waconia next to the Island View Golf Course near Minnesota State Highway 5. Much of the original congregation of the church are buried at the small cemetery.
