= Waconia =

Waconia may refer to a community in the United States:

- Waconia, Minnesota
- Waconia Township, Carver County, Minnesota
- Lake Waconia
