= Wendelin Grimm =

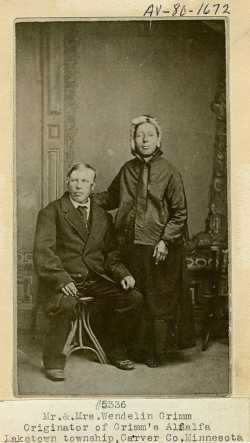
Wendelin and Julianne Grimm, undated

Wendelin Grimm (October 18, 1818 – December 8, 1890) was an American farmer. Grimm is best known for his innovative seed-saving techniques at his Wendelin Grimm Farmstead that resulted in North America's first winter-hardy alfalfa.

== Biography ==
=== Personal life ===
Grimm was born in Külsheim, Grand Duchy of Baden, as one of seven children to Valentine and Mary Grimm. His childhood was spent in a part of Germany known for its rich agricultural heritage. His formal education was limited to the perfunctory training that would have been given to youth training for a career in farming.

At the age of 27, he married Julianna Segner (June 15, 1821 – October 28, 1897) of Steinback, Baden, Germany. They farmed in Germany until 1857 when, with Julianna and their children, Grimm relocated to Carver County, Minnesota by way of New York. Wendelin and Julianna had a total of ten children, seven born in Germany and three born in the United States, only four of them reaching adulthood:

- Frank Grimm (10/18/1846-9/25/1925)
- Joseph Grimm (4/18/1848-1/29/1929)
- Ottilia (Grimm) Kelzer (11/23/1856-2/25/1925)
- Caroline (Grimm) Glatzel (2/4/1859-12/29/1905)

The Grimms homesteaded property near modern-day Victoria, Minnesota. During their time at this location, they transformed the property from a crude log-cabin homestead to a fully functional farmstead. What remains of that farmstead is now part of the Carver Park Reserve and listed on the National Register of Historic Places.

In 1872, Grimm passed the original farmstead onto his son Frank. He then moved to modern-day Chaska and continued to farm. His second farmstead is still occupied and farmed by Grimm's descendants. Wendelin Grimm died on December 8, 1890.

=== Farming innovations ===
When Grimm arrived in Minnesota in the fall of 1857, he brought with him more than just his family. Grimm also carried with him a small bag of "ewiger klee" or "everlasting clover" seeds. These seeds were the best producers from his farmstead in Germany. The following spring, Grimm planted his alfalfa seeds on his newly purchased land. The winters in Minnesota were harsher than in Germany. The winter killed much of his crop. Each year, he would save the seeds from the plants that survived and replant them the following spring. After many years of this practice, he no longer experienced winterkill on his crop.

Many of Grimm's neighbors noticed the superiority of his crops and the health of his cattle. One of them, Arthur B. Lyman, worked to bring Grimm's alfalfa to the attention of Professor Willet Hays at the University of Minnesota. Hays brought Grimm's alfalfa to the masses. A deficiency in Grimm's alfalfa was its inability to resist bacterial wilt. In the 1940s, more resistant strains were developed, and Grimm's alfalfa was no longer widely used. However, Roger Stein of the Carver Park Reserve discusses the importance of the alfalfa grown by Grimm in stating, "You could say that all North American alfalfa comes from parents that originated on this site." It is estimated that Grimm's alfalfa is the basis for the United States' third largest crop (hay) accounting for 60 million acres (240,000 km^{2}) and a value of $3.4 billion annually.

== Honors ==
- A bronze monument in Wendelin Grimm's honor was erected at the original homestead property on June 10, 1924. Over 400 people attended to commemorate Grimm's contributions to agriculture.
- Renovation on the original farmstead was completed in 2001 and celebrated with an open house. Events included era-appropriate activities like wool spinning and a speech by a Grimm descendant, great grandson Clarence Kelzer.
- In an homage to the significance of Grimm's alfalfa to Carver County, many of the housing developments in the area once occupied by farmland are now named in its honor. Neighborhoods and school names include: Clover Ridge, Clover Fields and Clover Preserve.
- The State of Minnesota celebrated its sesquicentennial anniversary in 2008. To celebrate, the state requested citizens to nominate the most significant events and/or people in Minnesota's History. Wendelin Grimm and his alfalfa made the final list of 150.
