= Wendelin Grimm Farmstead =

- U.S. National Register of Historic Places
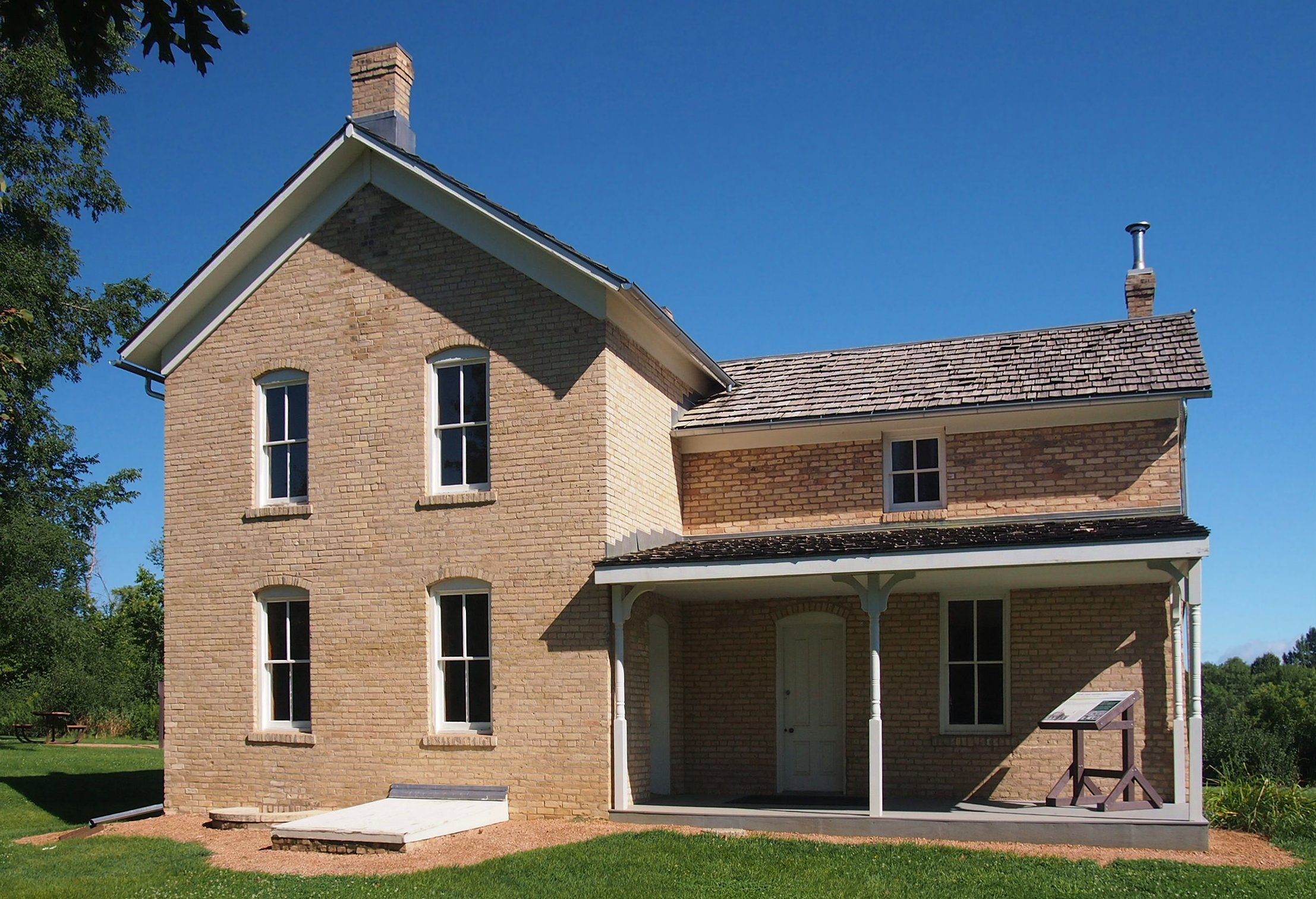
- The Wendelin Grimm Farmhouse from the south

- Location within Minnesota Location within the United States
- Location: Laketown Township, Minnesota
- Nearest city: Victoria, Minnesota
- Coordinates: 44°53′5″N 93°43′1″W
- Built: 1876
- NRHP reference No.: 74001008
- Added to NRHP: December 30, 1974

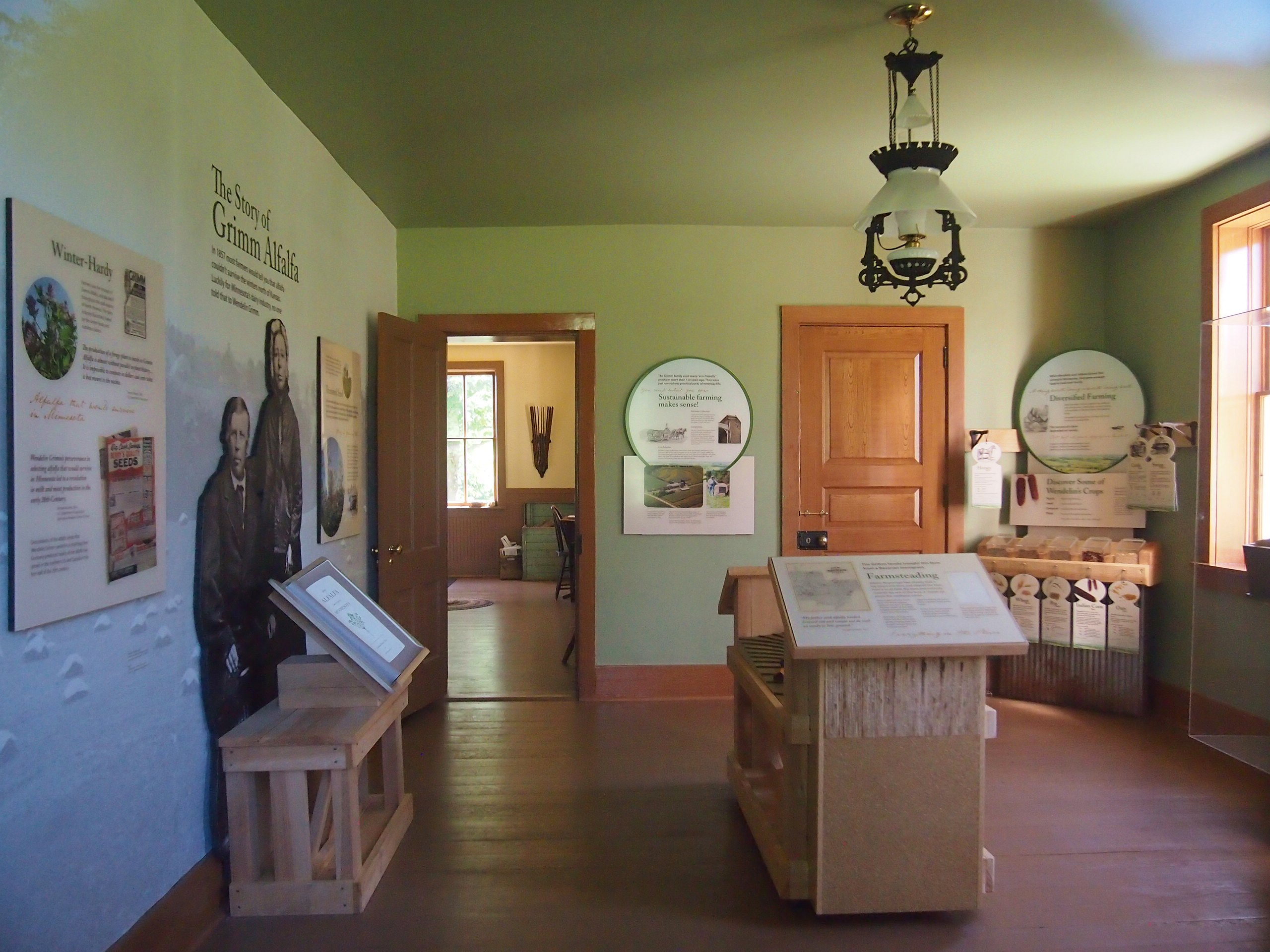
Museum displays in the farmhouse

The Wendelin Grimm Farmstead is a historic farm near Victoria, Minnesota, United States, listed on the National Register of Historic Places. The farm is located within the boundaries of Carver Park Reserve.

== History ==
The owners of the farm, Wendelin and Julianna Grimm, immigrated from Germany and settled in Carver County, Minnesota in 1859. Wendelin Grimm cleared a section of land, which was part of the Big Woods, and established his farm using native farming methods from Germany. He practiced seed saving and brought a box of seeds named "everlasting clover", which was actually alfalfa. Over the next 15 years, he selected the seeds of the alfalfa plants which survived the harsh Minnesota winters. The result of this process was the first truly winter-hardy alfalfa in North America.

By 1890, Carver County had more than 1,000 acres (400 ha) of alfalfa under cultivation. Grimm convinced some of his neighbors to use his seed, and after a number of severe winters around 1895 when all the common alfalfa died, his alfalfa crop started to attract more attention. In 1900, two professors from the Minnesota Agricultural Experiment Station, Willet M. Hays and Andrew Boss, visited his farm and were impressed by the thriving crop in the winter. A few years later, Hays, who had become the assistant United States Secretary of Agriculture, named the variety "Grimm" alfalfa. Hays recommended the continuing improvement of alfalfa through breeding efforts by the United States Department of Agriculture, and Grimm alfalfa provided the germplasm that provided winter hardiness to new cultivars.

Grimm alfalfa became a very important crop, and is now the source of all modern varieties of alfalfa grown on 25,000,000 acres (10,000,000 ha) of the United States (an area only slightly smaller than the U.S. state of Kentucky), with a value of $10 billion annually. University of Minnesota agronomy professor Lawrence Elling called Grimm alfalfa the most important crop development in North America until the invention of hybrid corn.

== Preservation ==
Hennepin County Park Reserve District (now Three Rivers Park District) acquired the farm property in 1962 when Carver Park Reserve was established, and the farm was listed on the National Register of Historic Places in 1974. Since the land was no longer a working farm, the farmhouse was in a process of decay, and trees had begun to grow in the former pastureland. In 1993, the Minnesota Historical Society noticed that the state was losing historic agricultural sites, and it identified the Grimm farm as a high priority for stabilization and preservation. The Minnesota State Historic Preservation Office and the Legislative Commission on Minnesota Resources conducted a reuse study and soon began emergency stabilization of the farmhouse. This involved vandal-proofing the windows and doors, replacing the roof, and rehabilitating the foundation. In 1998-99, the interior restoration began, and was completed in 2001. On October 6, 2001, the completion was celebrated with an open house.

Located in Carver Park Reserve, the site is now known as Grimm Farm Historic Site and is open to the public during education and special programs.
