= Robbinsdale Library =

Defunct branch library of the Hennepin County Library system in Robbinsdale, Minnesota

- U.S. National Register of Historic Places
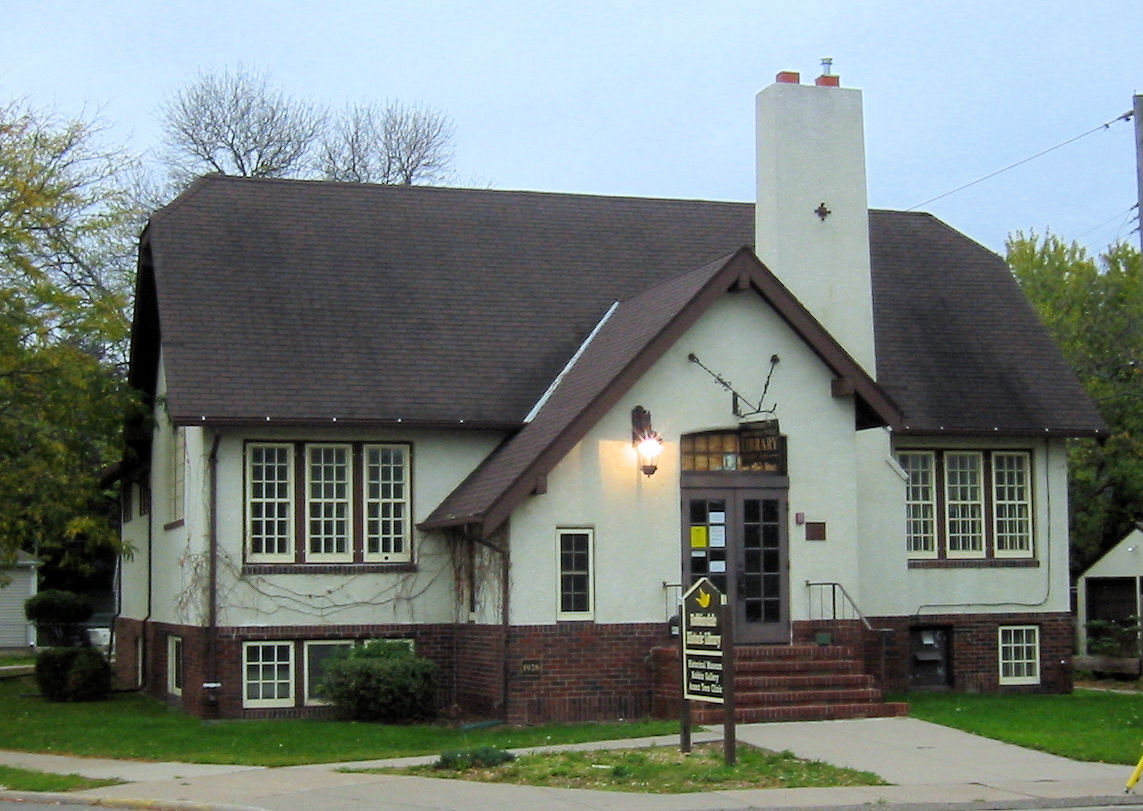
- Robbinsdale Library in 2007

- Location within Minnesota Location within the United States
- Location: Robbinsdale, Minnesota
- Coordinates: 45°1′52.13″N 93°20′31.15″W
- Built: 1925
- Architect: H. H. Livingston
- NRHP reference No.: 78001546
- Added to NRHP: October 2, 1978

The Robbinsdale Library was a community library in Robbinsdale, Minnesota built in 1925 through the efforts of the Robbinsdale Library Club. The building was listed on the National Register of Historic Places in 1978.

The Robbinsdale Library Club was first organized in 1907. Books were originally kept in the Village Hall, but in 1917 a small building was moved to a location on Rockford Road, now known as 42nd Avenue North, west of the Great Northern Railway (now BNSF Railway) tracks. This building proved inadequate, so a new library building was built on the same location and opened on January 4, 1926. The cost of construction, about $8,000 to $9,000, was funded with donations from local citizens and the library club. The Hennepin County Library system took over the library in 1922, but the library club still owned the building and grounds.

Eventually, the Hennepin County Library system built a larger, regional library in Crystal about a mile west of the Robbinsdale library. The new Rockford Road Library opened in 1973, so the old Robbinsdale library was closed in 1975. At the time of its closure, the library had a collection of about 17,000 volumes and an annual circulation of over 102,000. City Councilman Verne Baker led efforts to list the building on the National Register of Historic Places. A plaque on the building reads, "Robbinsdale Community Center, Robbin Gallery - Declared National Historic Site 1978 - Built in 1926 for use as a public library by Robbinsdale Library Club which was founded in 1904 - Donated to the City of Robbinsdale for community use, 1977." The building now houses the Robbinsdale Historical Society and Robbin Gallery.
