= Cycling Museum of Minnesota =

Museum in Minnesota

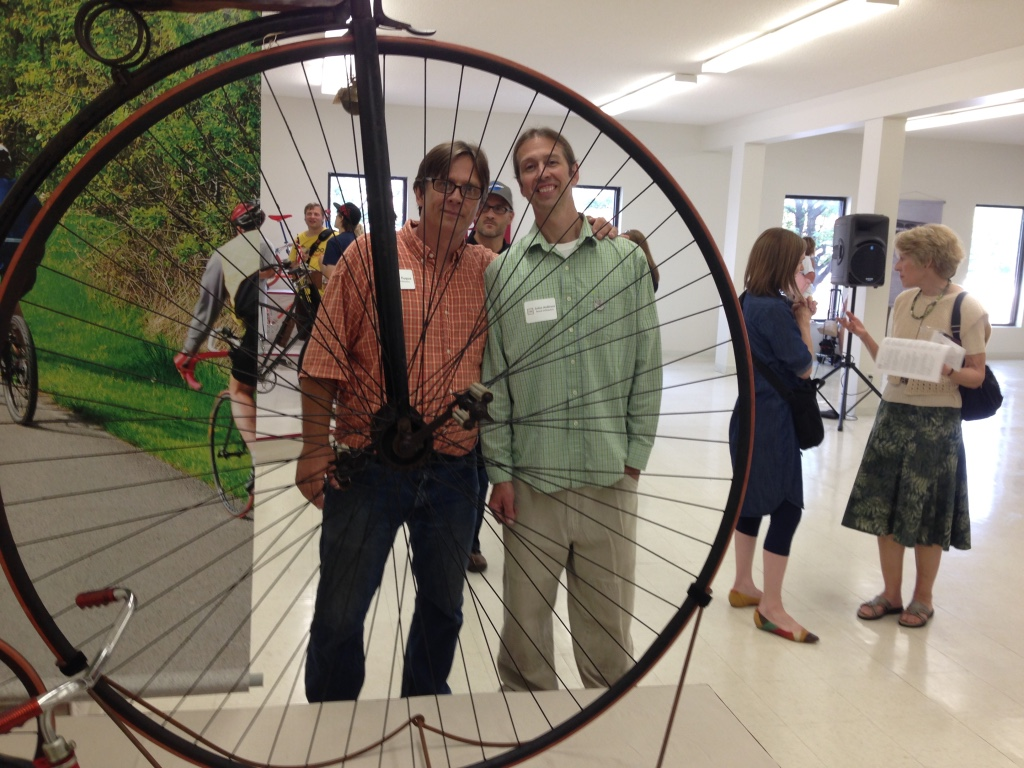
- Juston Anderson and Brent Fuqua, two of the Founding members
- Established: 2015
- Location: Twin Cities, Minnesota
- Coordinates: 45.013444°N 93.247639°W
- Type: Cycling history
- Website: www.cmm.bike

The Cycling Museum of Minnesota is a non-profit organization whose mission is to celebrate the history of cycling in Minnesota and its impact on the state's culture and communities. The museum collects bicycles and cycling-related artifacts to preserve this history. It also organizes exhibitions, educational programs, and advocacy efforts to promote cycling.

== History ==
In early 2013, bike shop owners Brent Fuqua and Seth Stattmiller converted unused space at Recovery Bike Shop into a bike museum. They later collaborated with avid collector Juston Anderson to showcase a portion of his antique bicycle collection. Together, they sought advice from the local museum and cycling community to establish a permanent, non-profit museum, finalizing their mission and vision on February 12, 2014. In January 2015 they achieved nonprofit status.

They later set up in the basement of St. Mark's Church in the Loring Park neighborhood of Minneapolis after having to leave their Central Avenue space due to the lack of an additional stairway in case of fire. The museum operated their collections storage out of St. Mark's Church while partnering with institutions such as the Hennepin History Museum to hold shows, exhibits, and programs around the Twin Cities metro area.

In June 2022 they moved their bicycle collection from St. Mark's Cathedral in Minneapolis to Quality Bike Products corporate offices in Bloomington. The museum is currently in development and does not have a permanent location.

== Collection ==
The Cycling Museum of Minnesota's collection includes over 100 bicycles from various eras, showcasing the technological advancements in cycling over time. The collection includes bicycles manufactured in Minnesota, such as the 1901 Rainmaker, alongside significant models like a 1979 Mongoose BMX and a 1980 Chris Kvale road bike.

== Gallery ==
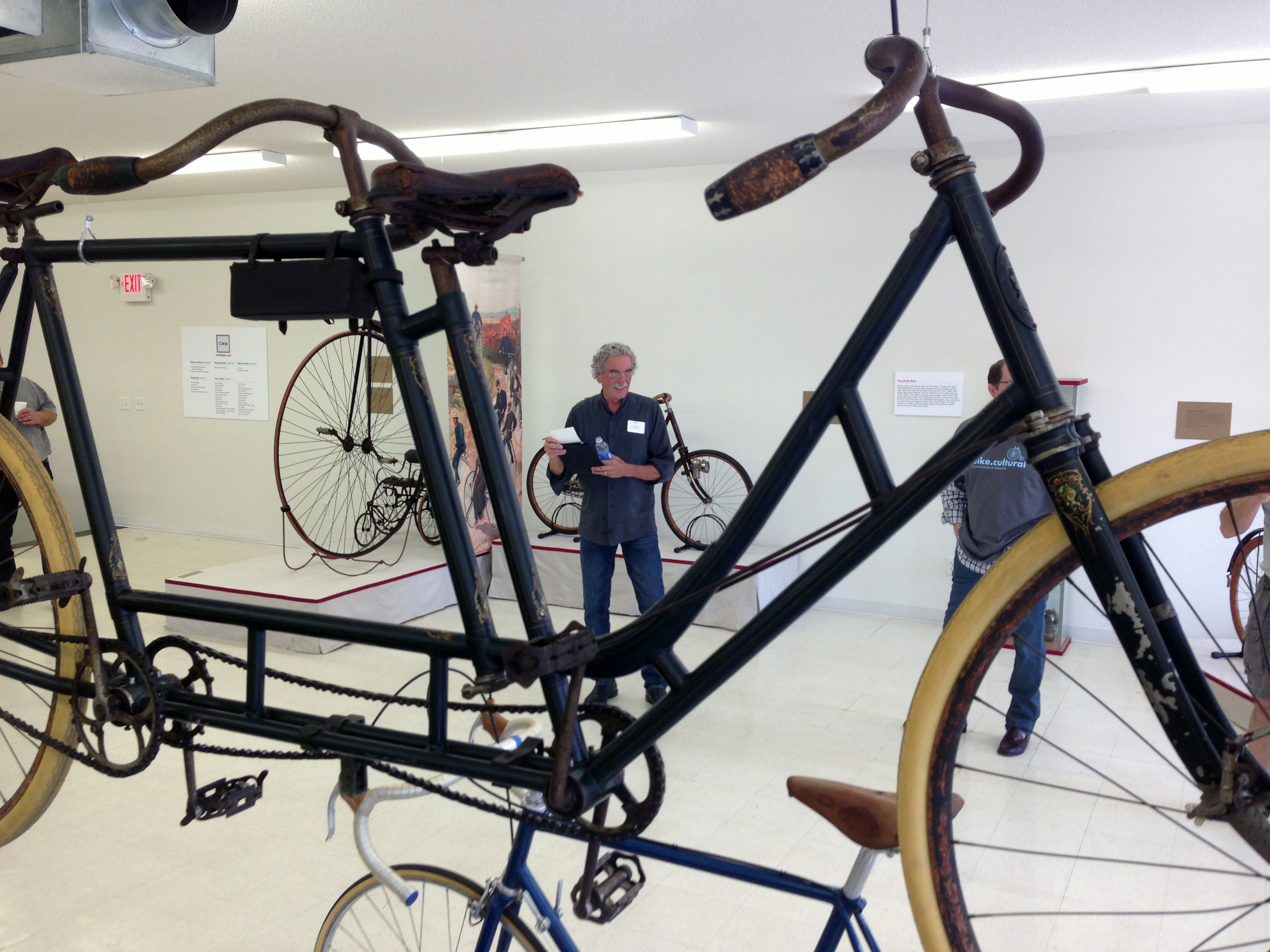

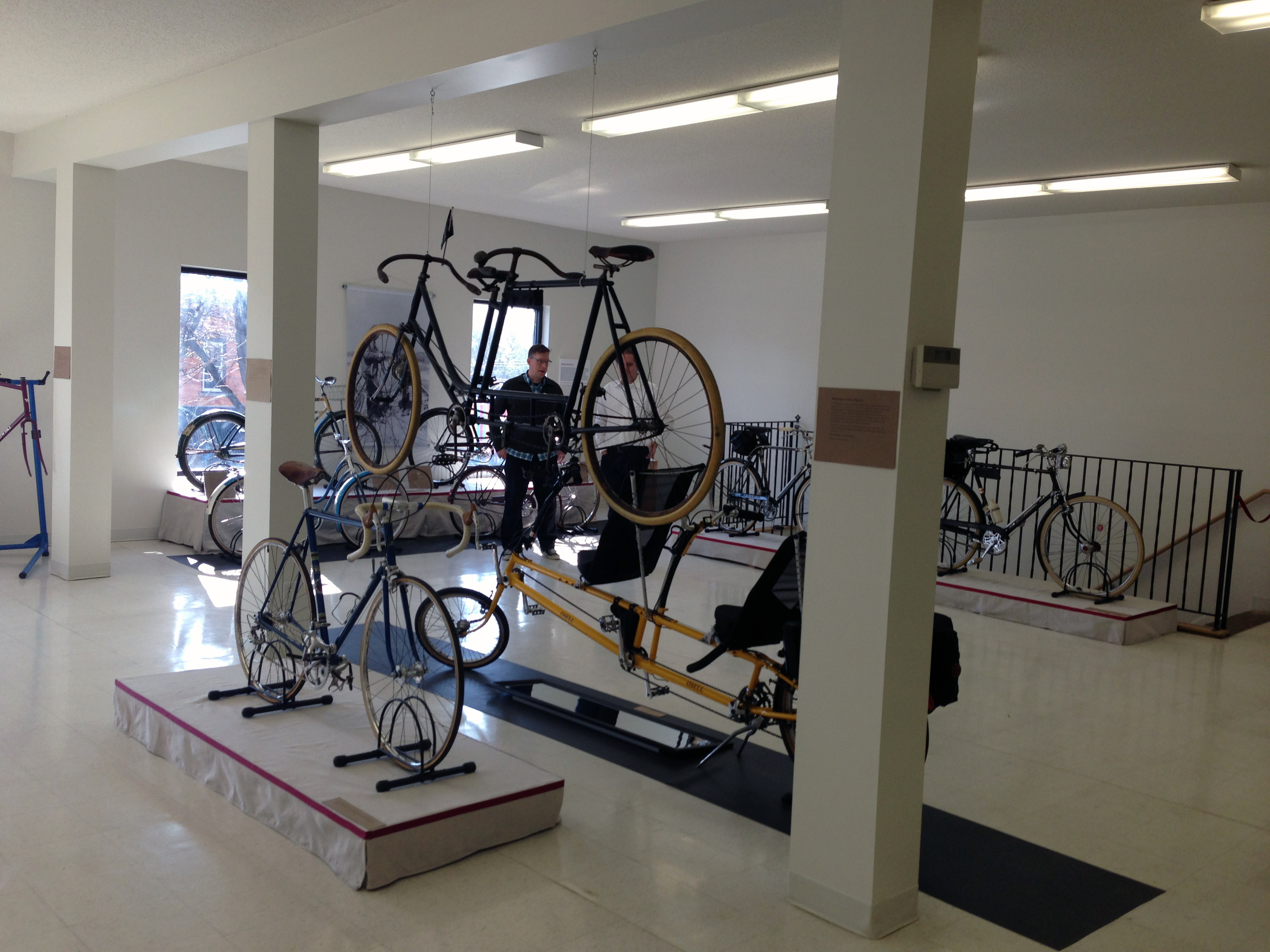

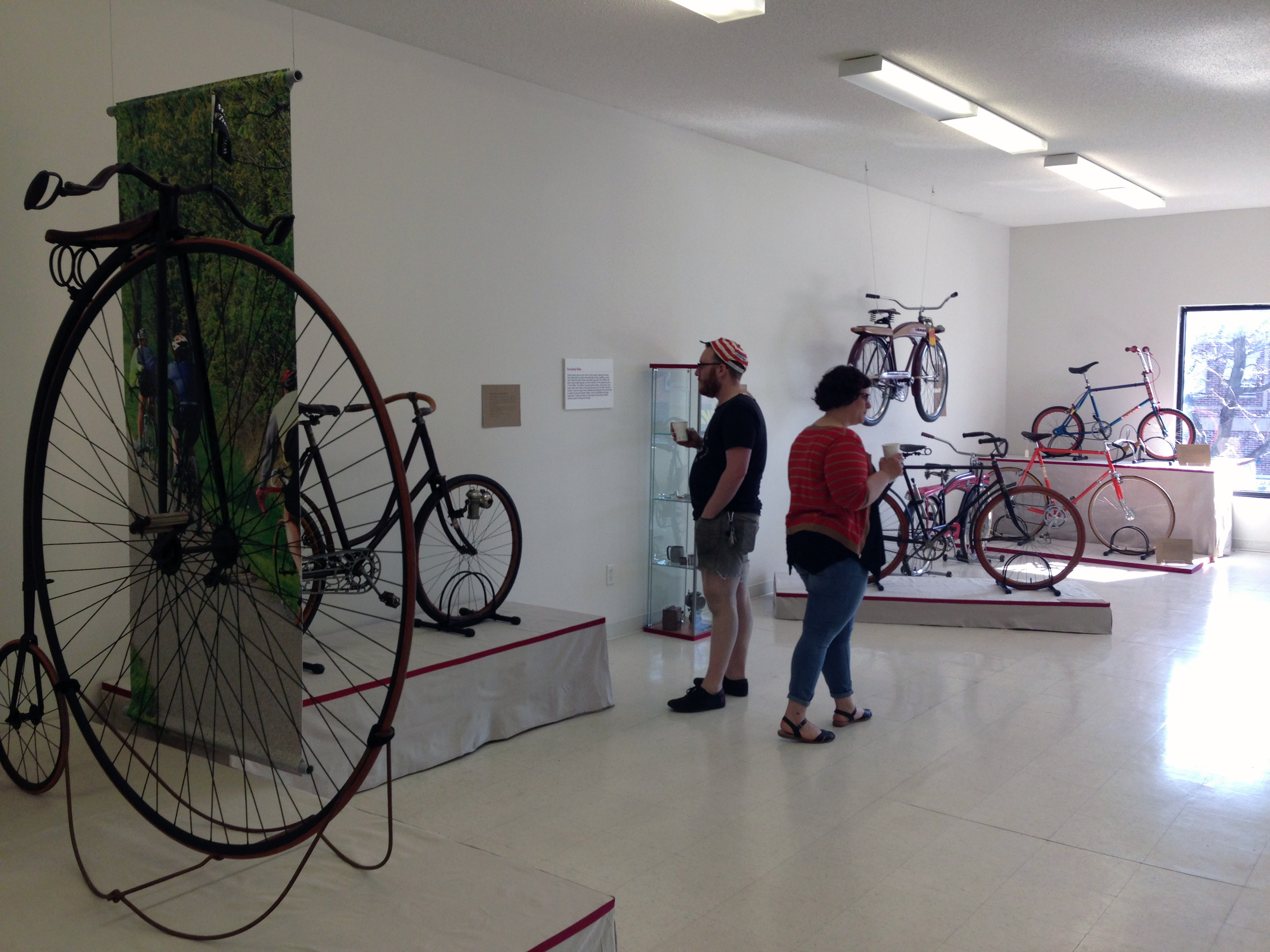

== See also ==
- List of museums in Minnesota
