= The Works (science museum) =

Children's museum in Bloomington, Minnesota

Coordinates: 44°49′38″N 93°17′10″W

- Established: 1995
- Location: Bloomington, Minnesota
- Type: Science Museum
- Website: The Works

The Works is an interactive children's museum in Bloomington, Minnesota that focuses on technology and engineering.

The museum was conceived by Rebecca Schatz, a software engineer who was inspired by a visit to the Exploratorium in San Francisco, and by the hands-on technical education for children that she observed during a year as a Luce Scholar in Japan in 1984. The Works first opened as a gallery exhibition within the Bell Museum of Natural History at the University of Minnesota in 1995, then moved to a series of temporary locations in shopping centers and to the community center in Edina (Ridgedale - 1995–1997, Eden Prairie Center 1997–1999, Southdale 1999–2002, and Edina Cmty. Center 2003–2011), before finding a larger, permanent home with 40,000 square feet of space in Bloomington in 2011. In 2011 the museum reported annual attendance of 50,000 visitors. Since 2003, The Works has sponsored an annual "Tech Fest".
