= Holz Family Farmstead =

- U.S. National Register of Historic Places
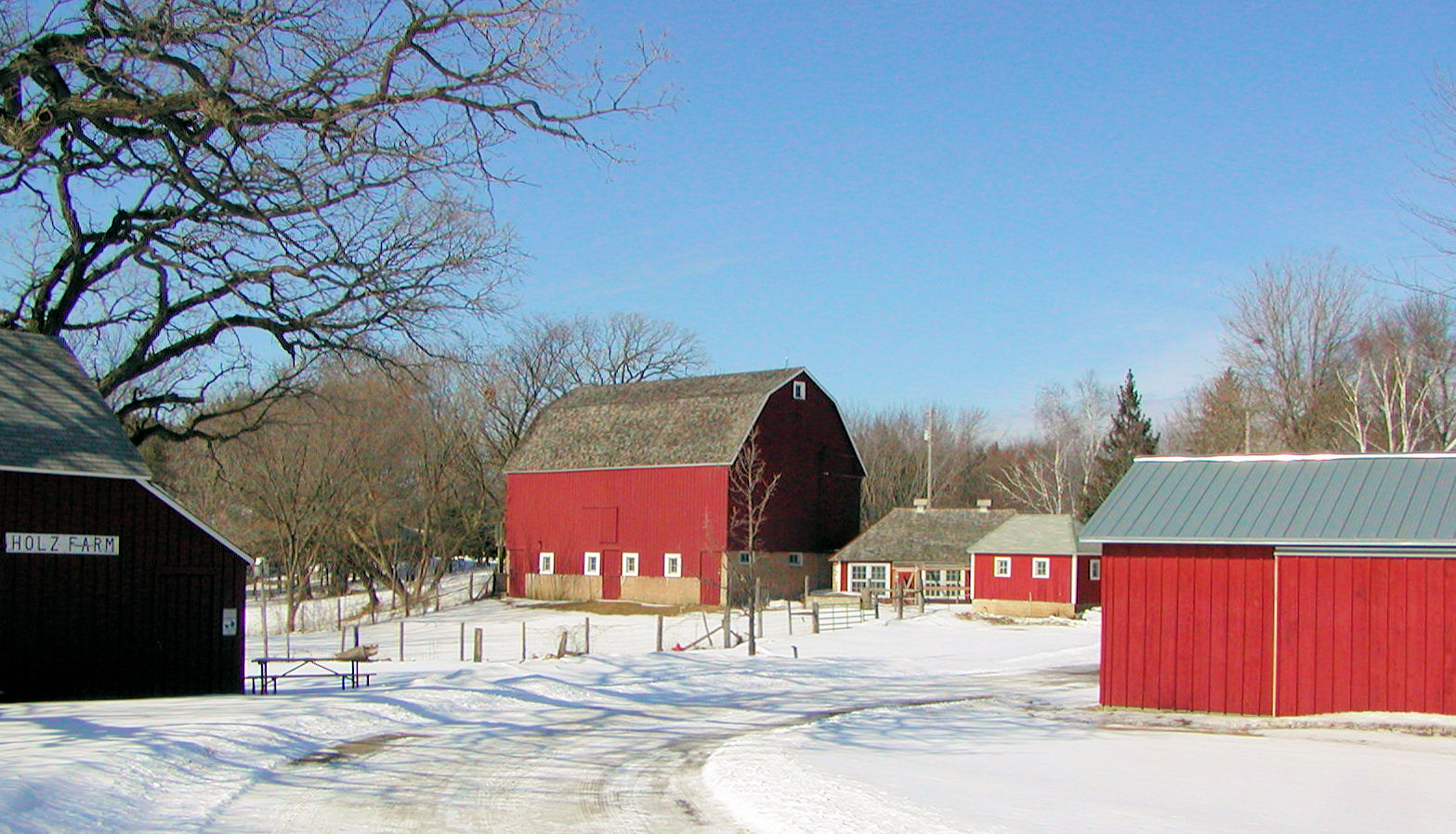

- Location within Minnesota Location within the United States
- Location: 4665 Manor Drive, Eagan, Minnesota
- Coordinates: 44°47′16″N 93°6′56″W
- Built: 1870s
- NRHP reference No.: 07000459,
- Added to NRHP: May 24, 2007

The Holz Family Farmstead included an 80-acre (32 ha) family farm in Eagan in the US state of Minnesota. Ground was broken by the Holz family in the 1870s, and they raised livestock, crops, fruits, and vegetables until 1993. The property had originally been purchased by developers intending to build residences but, in 1995, the city of Eagan purchased the property for use as a living farm museum.
