= Burschville School =

- U.S. National Register of Historic Places
- The school, painted white, with its outhouses in 2019

- Location within Minnesota Location within the United States
- Location: 22995 County Road 10, Corcoran, Minnesota
- Coordinates: 45°7′24.5″N 93°37′31″W
- Built: 1894
- NRHP reference No.: 100003081
- Added to NRHP: November 1, 2018

Burschville School, also known as District No. 107 School, is a one-room schoolhouse near Corcoran, Minnesota, United States. It was built in 1894 and listed on the National Register of Historic Places in 2018, complete with its original outhouses. It has been preserved as a museum embodying local efforts to provide education in rural Hennepin County.
