= Andrew Peterson (farmer) =

Swedish immigrant, farmer and botanist

- Anders Pettersson
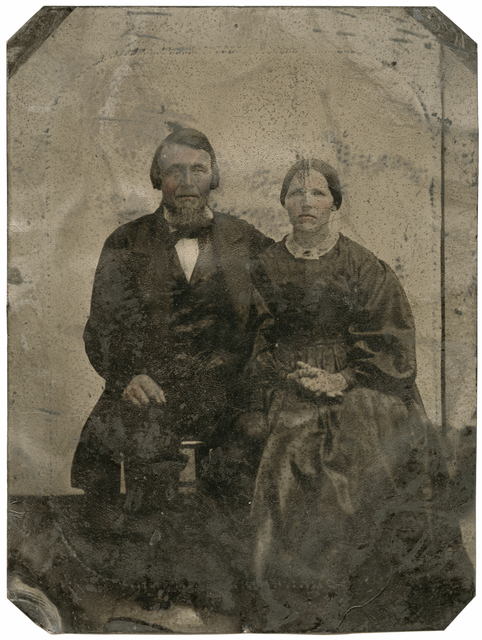
- Andrew Peterson and his wife Elsa Peterson (nee: Andersdotter)
- Born: Anders Pettersson; October 20, 1818; Västra Ryd parish in Ydre Municipality, Östergötland, Sweden
- Died: March 31, 1898 (aged 79); Andrew Peterson Farmstead; Waconia, Minnesota, U.S.
- Resting place: Scandia Baptist Cemetery; Waconia, Minnesota, U.S.
- Citizenship: Swedish, American
- Occupation: Farmer
- Known for: Development of apple trees which greatly influenced the Minnesota Landscape Arboretum

Andrew Peterson (Swedish: Anders Pettersson) was a Swedish immigrant, fruit farmer, and botanist who settled land in Waconia, Minnesota. Peterson's farmstead is listed on the National Register of Historic Places and is now a museum and interpretive center.

== Early life and emigration ==
Peterson was born on October 20, 1818, in Sjöarp,Östergötland, Sweden. Peterson immigrated to the United States in 1850 and arrived in Boston on July 2, 1850. Peterson eventually traveled to Peru, Illinois, and later to Burlington, Iowa. Peterson eventually anglicized his name while living in Iowa.

Peterson moved to Minnesota Territory in 1855 and settled near modern day Waconia, Minnesota where he planted an apple orchard and was a subsistence farmer. During his lifetime Peterson kept an intricate diary which details his daily chores and important events.

=== Influence on apple farming in Minnesota ===
Peterson joined the National Grange in 1874 where he sent experimental apple grafts to various agricultural societies. Peterson's grafting experiments were eventually recognized by the Minnesota Horticultural Society which held Peterson in high esteem.

Peterson's farmstead, which primarily consisted of various fruits, produced over 200 apple varieties. Peterson's orchards were later taken over by the state's horticultural society which would influence the later creation of the Minnesota Landscape Arboretum.

== Personal life ==
Andrew Peterson was married to Elsa Andersdotter in 1858, together they had nine children. Peterson was a religious Baptist and was the founder of the Scandia Baptist Church.

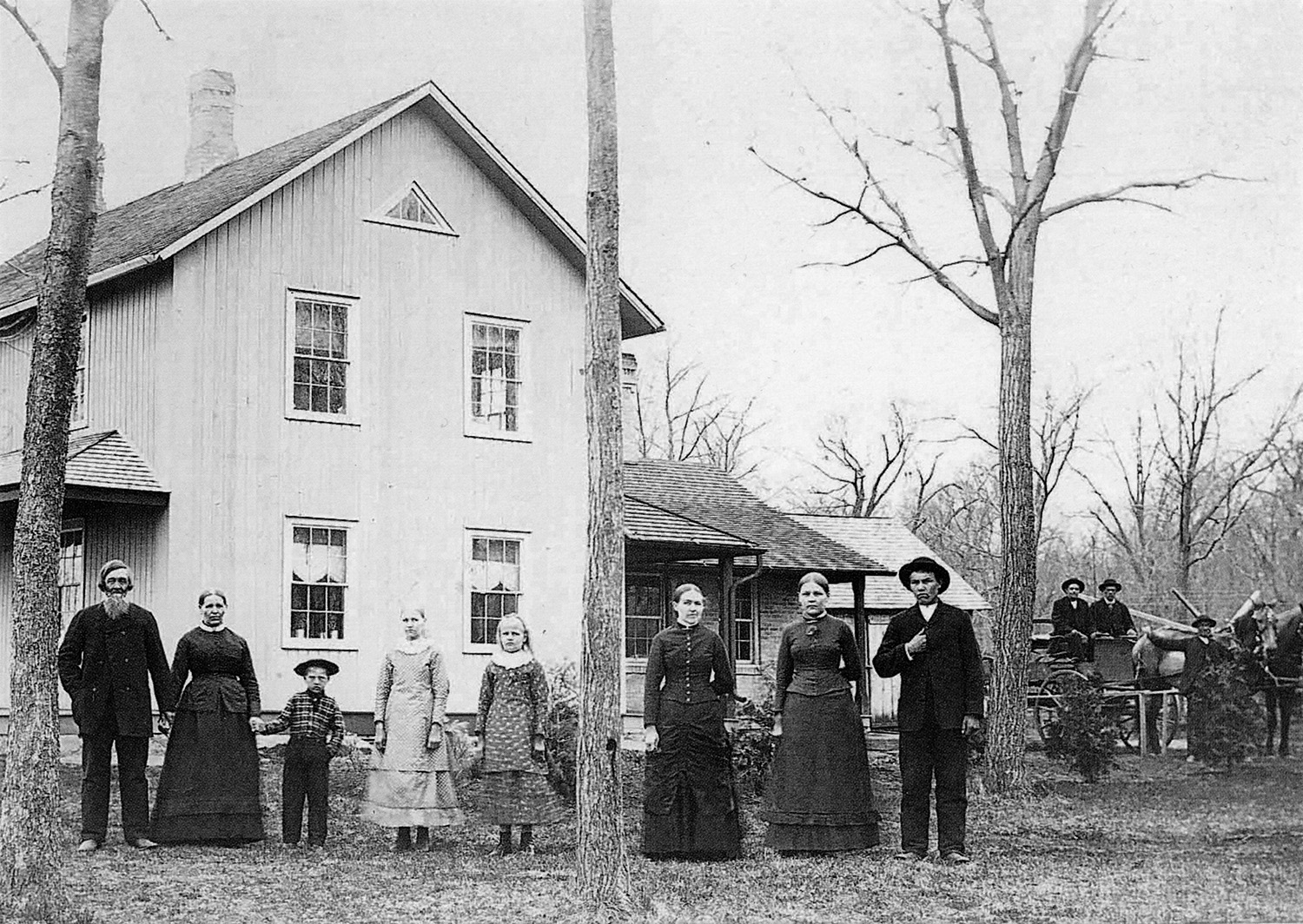
The Peterson family on May 8, 1885.

== Later life and death ==
Peterson died on March 31, 1898 in Waconia, Minnesota. His body was buried at the Scandia Baptist Cemetery, now part of Laketown Township.

== Farmstead ==
Peterson's farmstead, later called the Rock Island Farmstead, is listed on the National Register of Historic Places. The farm is preserved still today and includes much of the original farm, farmhouse, granary, outhouse, north barn, and south barn. The property was added to the NRHP on October 11, 1979. Currently, the Carver County Historical Society (CCHS) is working on restoring the property to its original 19th-century form. In 2022 the CCHS was given a $250,000 grant from the Jeffris family Foundation for the restoration process.

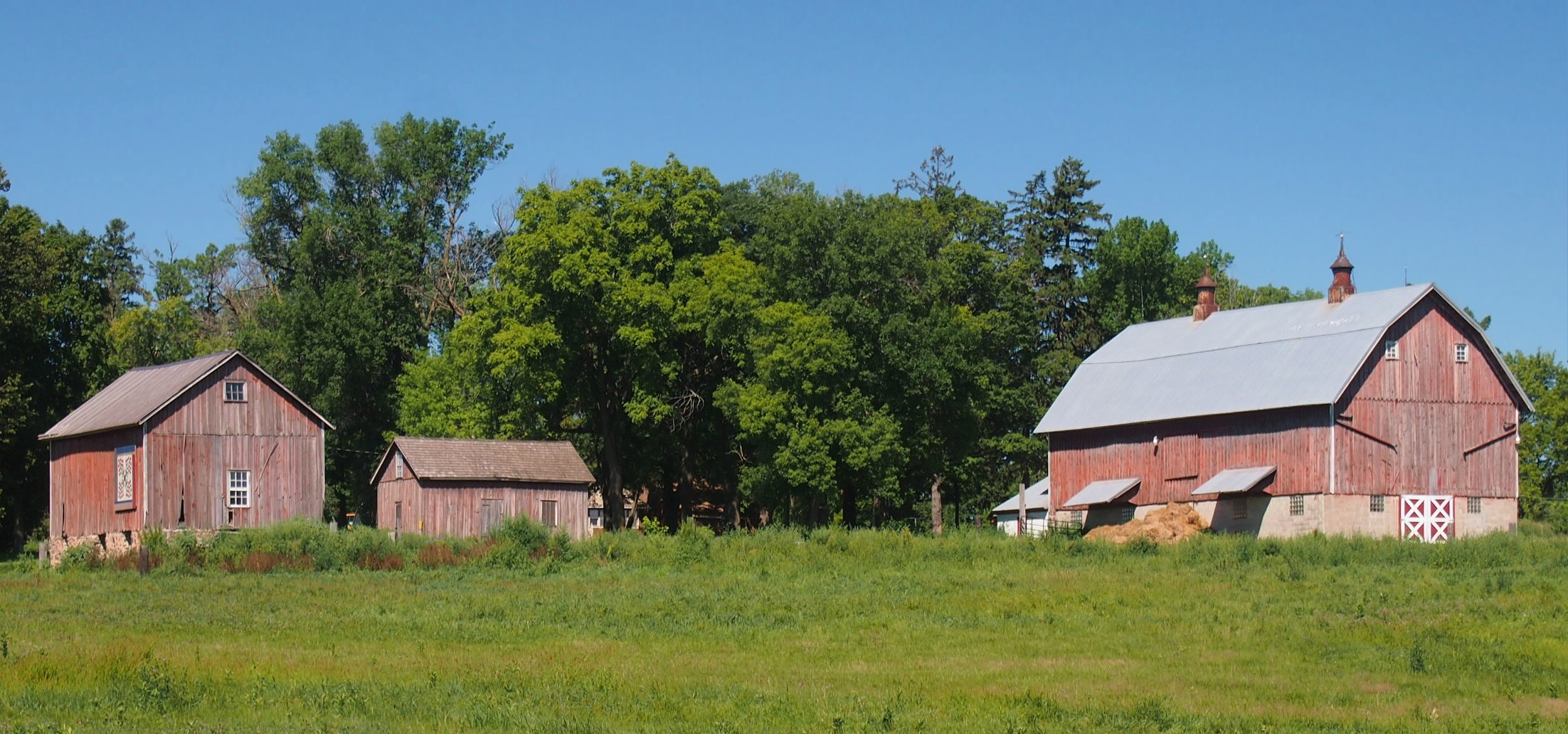
The Andrew Peterson Farmstead from the southeast.

== Influence on Vilhelm Moberg ==
Peterson's diary entries and journals had a significant influence on Vilhelm Moberg and his famous Swedish novel series The Emigrants. Moberg's novels were eventually adapted into two different films; The Emigrants (1971), and The New Land (1972), both of which were directed by Jan Troell and both starred Max von Sydow and Liv Ullmann. The main protagonist of the series, Karl Oskar Nilsson, a Swedish emigrant from Ljuders parish in Småland comes to Ki-Chi-Saga and establishes a settlement with his wife and children.
