= Hoċokata Ti =

Cultural center and museum in Shakopee, Minnesota

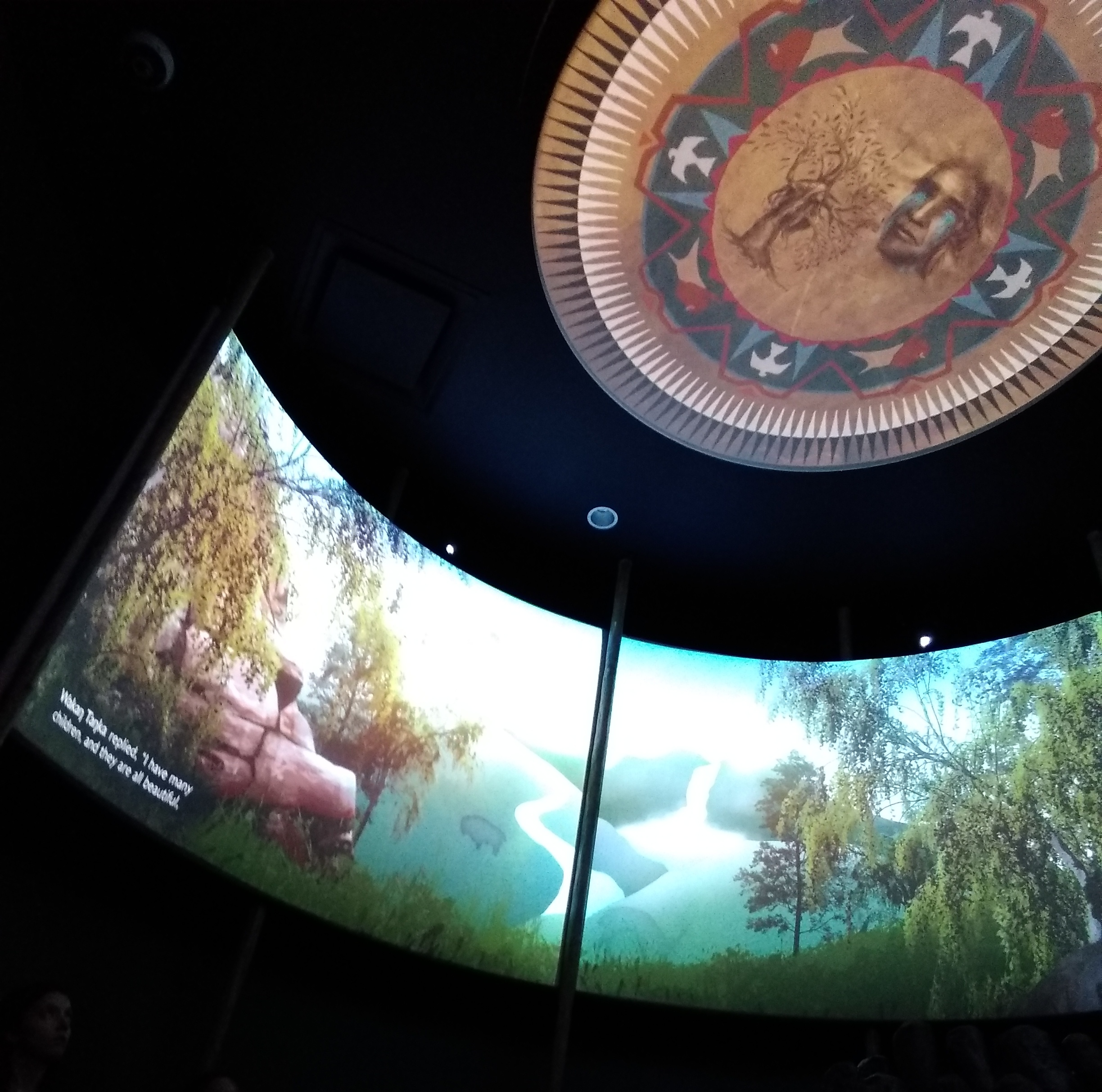
- Exhibit
- Established: 2019
- Location: 2300 Tiwahe Circle, Shakopee, Minnesota
- Coordinates: 44.7587°N 93.4644°W
- Type: Native American History
- Website: hocokatati.org

Hoċokata Ti is a cultural center and museum in Shakopee, Minnesota, operated by the Shakopee Mdewakanton Sioux Community (SMSC). The center functions as a gathering place for the community and a public site for learning about Mdewakanton Dakota history, culture, and language. The name Hoċokata Ti means "lodge at the center of the camp" in Dakota.

== Museum ==
The museum at Hoċokata Ti features a public exhibit titled Mdewakanton: Dwellers of the Spirit Lake. This exhibit presents the history and culture of the Mdewakanton Dakota from their perspective. The space includes artifacts, cultural displays, and educational resources. The museum is open to the public, while much of the rest of the building is reserved for community members. The center hosts regular events, including the annual Traditional SMSC Winter Wacipi, which features dancers, drums, singers, vendors, and moccasin games. The Young Native Pride event engages youth in Dakota traditions, song, and dance.

The building contains large gathering spaces, classrooms, a theater, a kitchen and dining area, conference rooms, and a sacred vault. These areas are used for community meetings, ceremonies, and events that bring together SMSC members. Dedicated classrooms support teaching Dakota language, history, and arts. The facility also provides space for cultural activities, talking circles, and traditional ceremonies, strengthening community bonds and supporting intergenerational learning.

The "Place of Gathering" within the building can accommodate up to 1,200 people, making it suitable for large events and celebrations. Administrative offices for SMSC staff and cultural program management are also housed within Hoċokata Ti, supporting the center's daily operations and long-term initiatives. Outdoor features, such as medicinal gardens, walking trails, and an archery range, are reserved for SMSC members and are used for cultural practices and community wellness. Through these varied uses, Hoċokata Ti fulfills the SMSC's mission to preserve Dakota heritage, language, and community life by providing a central location for education, tradition, and gathering.

=== Exhibits and collection ===
The main exhibit at Hoċokata Ti is Mdewakanton: Dwellers of the Spirit Lake. This 3,805-square-foot gallery presents the history, culture, and lifeways of the Mdewakanton Dakota people. Visitors encounter Dakota Sioux artifacts, hand-painted murals, and audio-visual presentations that share community stories and the Dakota creation story. The exhibit aims to deepen public understanding of Dakota history and identity.

Hoċokata Ti features rotating displays that highlight different aspects of Dakota and local history. A recent addition is a stratigraphic column near the gift shop, which explains the geological history of the area16. In 2024, a partnership with the Smithsonian's National Museum of the American Indian brought a wooden flute, believed to be from the late 1800s, back to Dakota homelands. This historic instrument is now on display in the main exhibit.

Hoċokata Ti houses a private collection of over 10,000 objects, including archaeological items, basketry, pottery, beadwork, regalia, and artwork. These items represent more than 130 cultures from across the United States, Northern Mexico, and Canada.

== Building history ==
The SMSC began planning Hoċokata Ti decades before construction. Groundbreaking occurred in 2016, and the building opened in 2019. The structure is 84,000 square feet and features curved lines, seven large tipi-shaped structures, and design elements that reflect Dakota cultural values. The building serves both as a museum and a gathering space for the SMSC, which previously did not have a facility large enough for all members.

The design avoids right angles, symbolizing the Dakota belief in the circle of life. The seven tipi forms represent the Dakota Nation and its values. The grounds include a stream symbolizing the Minnesota River and a bark lodge built with traditional materials for ceremonies and teachings.

== Governance ==
Hoċokata Ti is managed by the Shakopee Mdewakanton Sioux Community, a sovereign tribal nation. The SMSC oversees the center's operations, programming, and preservation efforts. Tribal members are involved in staffing and leadership. The center's mission is to interpret and encourage Mdewakanton Dakota heritage, language, and history through exhibitions and education.

In 2024, Hoċokata Ti was named a finalist for the National Medal for Museum and Library Service, recognizing its impact and commitment to community service and cultural preservation.

== See also ==
- List of museums in Minnesota
