= Golden Valley History Museum =

Museum in Golden Valley, Minnesota

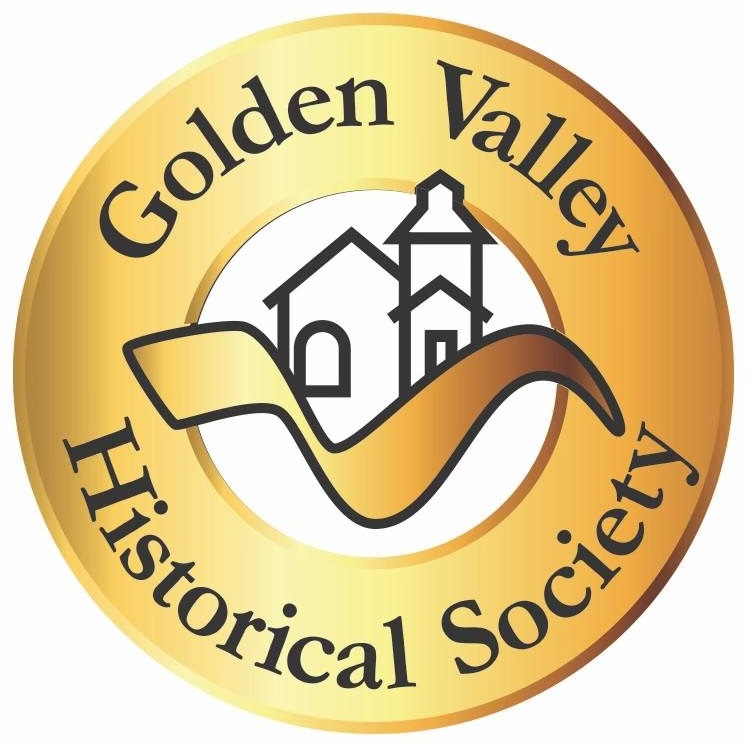

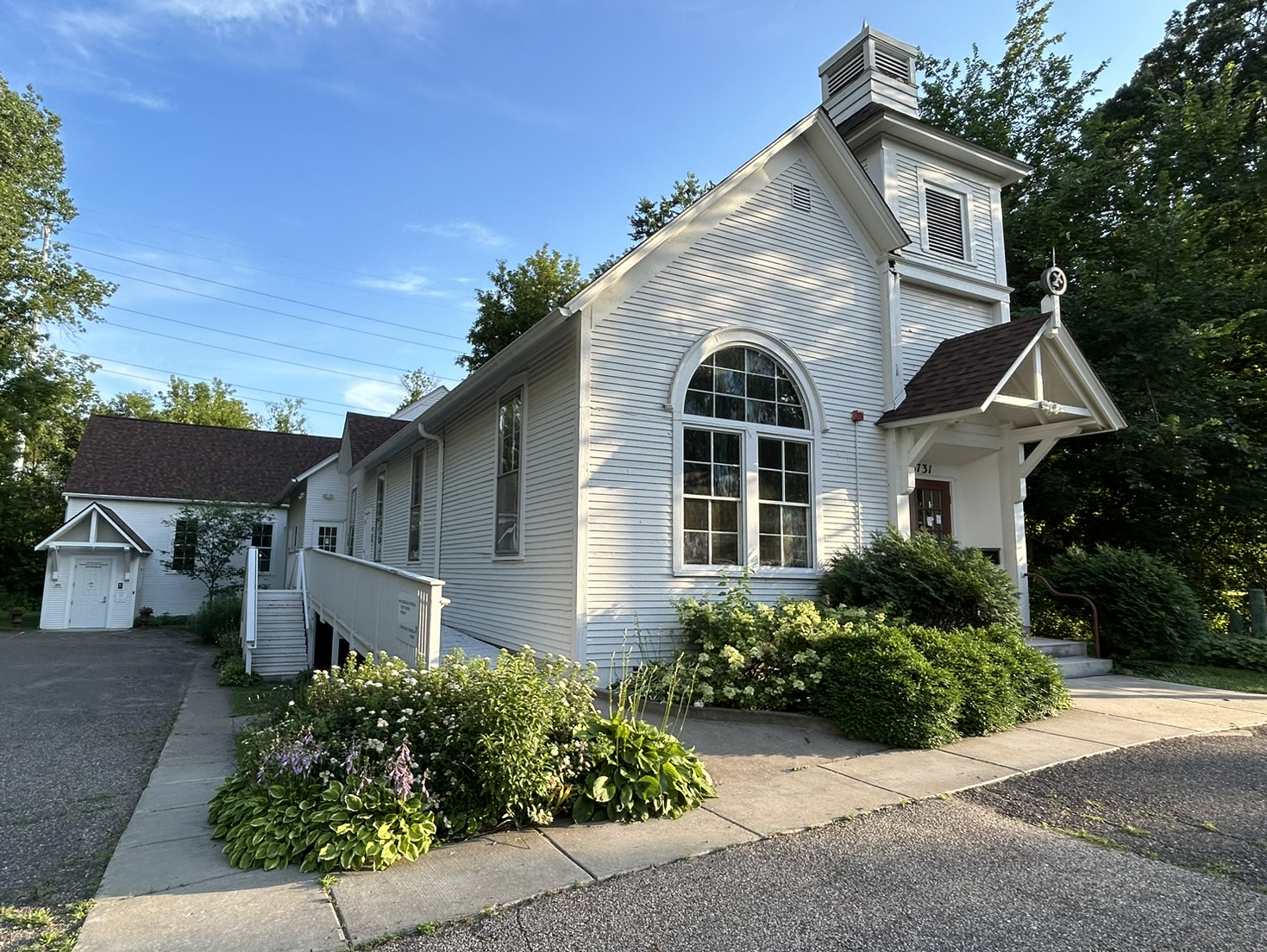
- Entrance
- Established: 1997
- Location: 6731 Golden Valley Rd, Golden Valley, Minnesota 55427, United States
- Coordinates: 44.989444°N 93.365°W
- Type: Local history
- Website: goldenvalleyhistoricalsociety.org

The Golden Valley History Museum is a local history museum located in Golden Valley, Minnesota and managed by the Golden Valley Historical Society.

== Building history ==
The main building housing the museum originally dates to 1882. Originally called the Mission Church it was built as a nondenominational, one-room church established by early settlers. Eight years after construction, it moved to its current location. In 1907, the congregation became associated with the Methodist Church. In the 1950s, when the Methodist congregation outgrew the building, they moved to a larger church. In 1997, the Golden Valley Historical Society acquired the building and adapted it as a permanent site for its collections and programs. The church remains the oldest building in Golden Valley. The upstairs chapel is intact and hosts events throughout the year. Structural improvements have included fire protection, accessibility changes, and the creation of archival and display spaces.

== Golden Valley Historical Society ==
The Golden Valley Historical Society (GVHS) was founded in 1974. Its mission is to find, preserve, and share historical information about Golden Valley. The Society maintains a collection of artifacts, documents, and photographs, and regularly presents public history programs. The Society also collects oral histories and video records about significant people, places, and events in the community.

== Museum exhibits and public programs ==
The Golden Valley History Museum features stories about the city's heritage in an exhibit titled "No Place Like Home." This exhibit includes more than 20 displays that tell stories about the city from pre-historic times to today. The exhibits are organized around five main themes: community, human rights, home, economy, and power. These themes connect the different displays to provide a deeper understanding of Golden Valley’s history.

In addition to the exhibit, the museum hosts public programs such as talks, panel discussions, and special events. These programs often focus on local history topics and include celebrations like Black History Month.

== See also ==
- List of museums in Minnesota
