= Willet M. Hays =

American botanist (1859–1928)

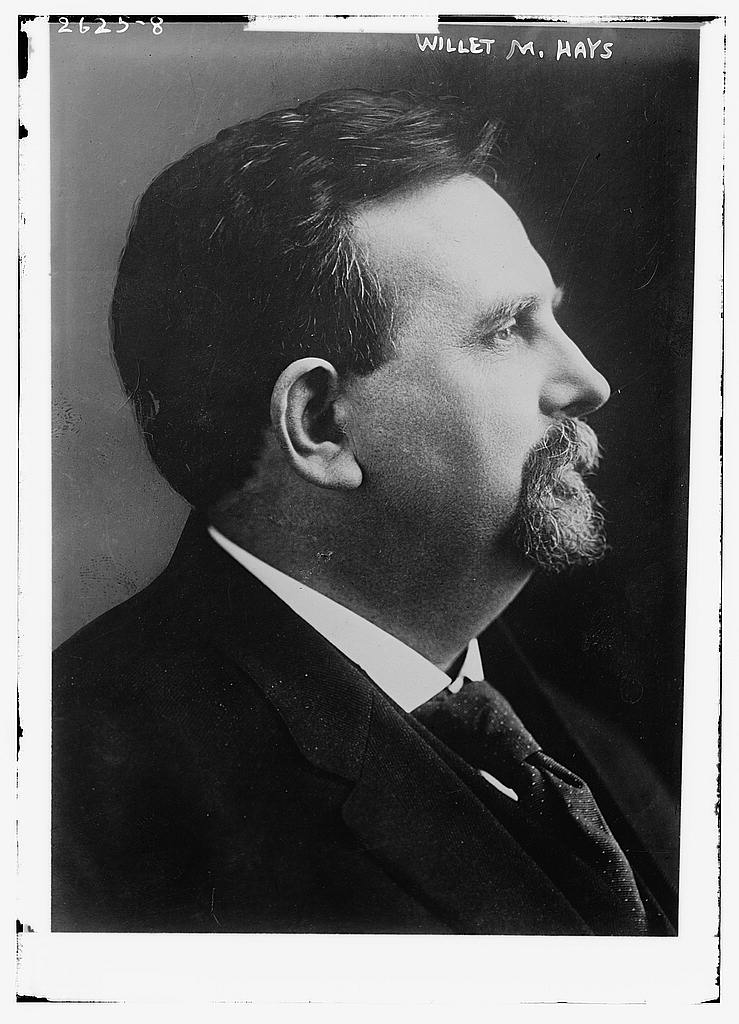
Willet Martin Hays circa 1913

Willet Martin Hays (19 October 1859 – 16 January 1928) was an American plant breeder and U. S. Assistant Secretary of Agriculture.

== Biography ==
Hays was born 19 October 1859 on a farm near Eldora, Iowa.

He graduated from Drake University in 1885 and obtained a master's degree in agriculture from the Iowa State College at Ames. In 1888 he became the first faculty member of the newly founded Minnesota Agricultural Experimental Station of the University of Minnesota at St. Paul. He served there until 1904, interrupted by a two-year stint at the North Dakota Agricultural College at Fargo 1891–1893.

=== Systematic breeding ===
"There are Shakespeares among plants" was Hays' reasoning for selecting specific plant units for further breeding. Thus he produced new varieties of plants by selective breeding and crossing. Among his successes were commercially important varieties of superior flax, wheat, corn, barley, and oat; he also discovered winter-resistant Grimm alfalfa.

=== Government service ===
In 1904 Hays was appointed Assistant Secretary of Agriculture and served under James Wilson in the administration of Theodore Roosevelt. He was responsible for setting up the project system for agricultural research that was later developed into the state experimental stations. Hays improved rural infrastructure and took measures to help teach agricultural practices. The Smith-Lever Act and the Smith-Hughes Act were drafted with his help. He left government service in 1913.

In 1913 Hays drafted the protocol for the New International Institute of Agriculture in Rome, the forerunner of today's United Nations Food and Agriculture Organization. The same year he went to Argentina where he helped to set up the Department of Agriculture and in the planning of the University of Tucuman.

Hays wrote at length on the benefits of eugenics, believing that his plant science research supported the restraining of reproduction by deficient classes and families, including immigrants and feeble-minded persons.

=== Death ===
By 1915 Hays suffered from ill health and retired on a farm, first in Pennsylvania, later in Iowa. He died on January 15, 1927, in Eldora, Iowa.

== Organizations ==
Hays was influential in the creation of a number of organizations. In 1903 he founded the American Breeders' Association (ABA), renamed American Genetic Association in 1915. Hays was the first president of the ABA, a position he kept for ten years. He formulated the three objectives of the organization: "(1) Determine the laws of inheritance in animals and plants. (2) Learn the application of these laws to increase the intrinsic commercial and artistic values of living things. (3) Aid in bringing about this desired improvement through associated effort."

== Legacy ==
Hays had a Liberty ship, the U.S. Willet M. Hays, hull number 2763, named after him. The ship was laid down at the Permente Metals Corporation, Shipbuilding Division, Yard No. 2, Richmond, California, in February 1944, and launched on March 4. In 1947, the Willet M. Hays was sold, and it was scrapped in 1964.
