= Andrew Peterson Farmstead =

Open air farmstead museum

- U.S. National Register of Historic Places
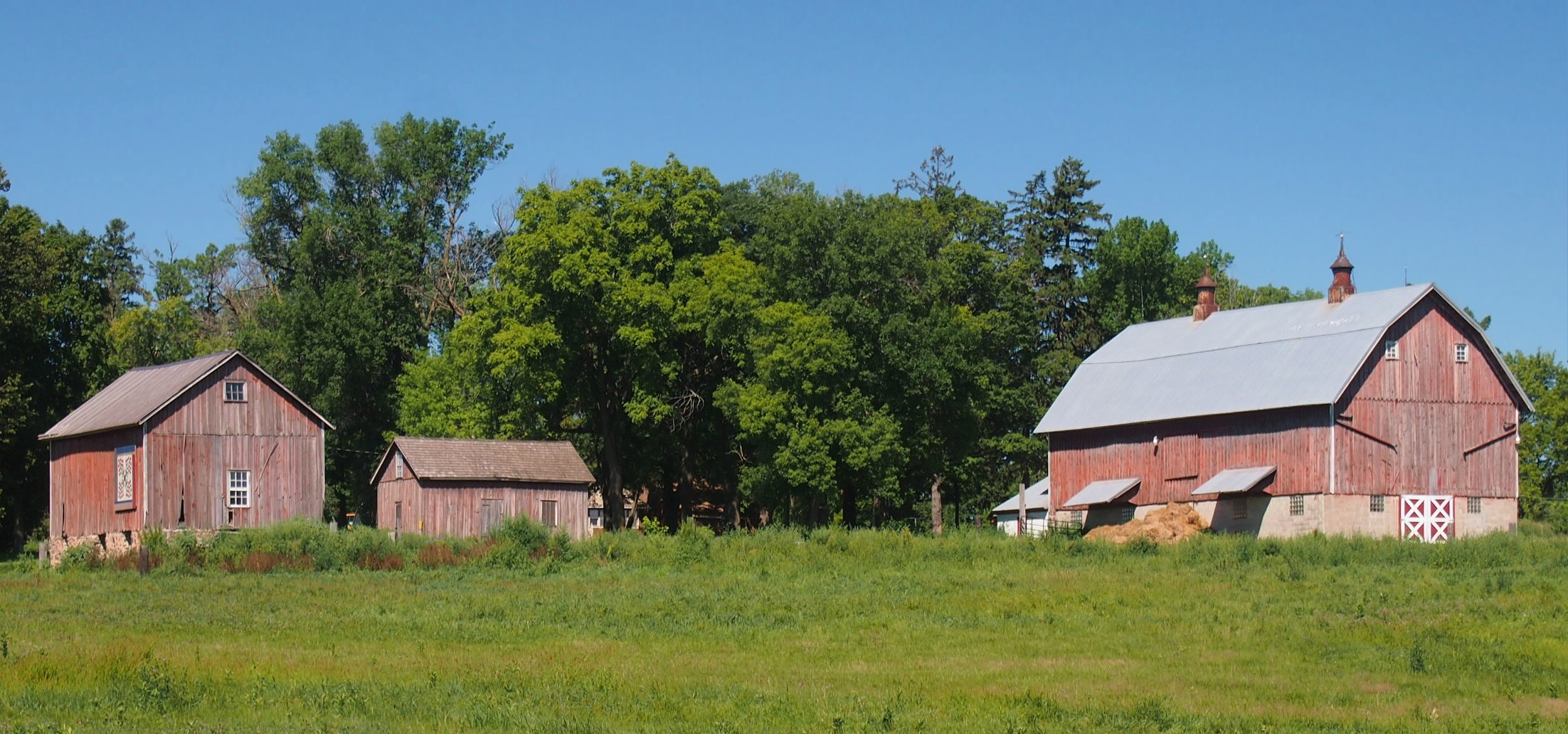
- The Andrew Peterson Farmstead from the southeast

- Location within Minnesota Location within the United States
- Nearest city: Waconia, Minnesota
- Coordinates: 44°51′50″N 93°43′30″W
- Area: 8.5 acres (3.4 ha)
- Built: 1867
- Architectural style: Greek Revival
- NRHP reference No.: 79003713
- Added to NRHP: October 11, 1979

Andrew Peterson Farmstead
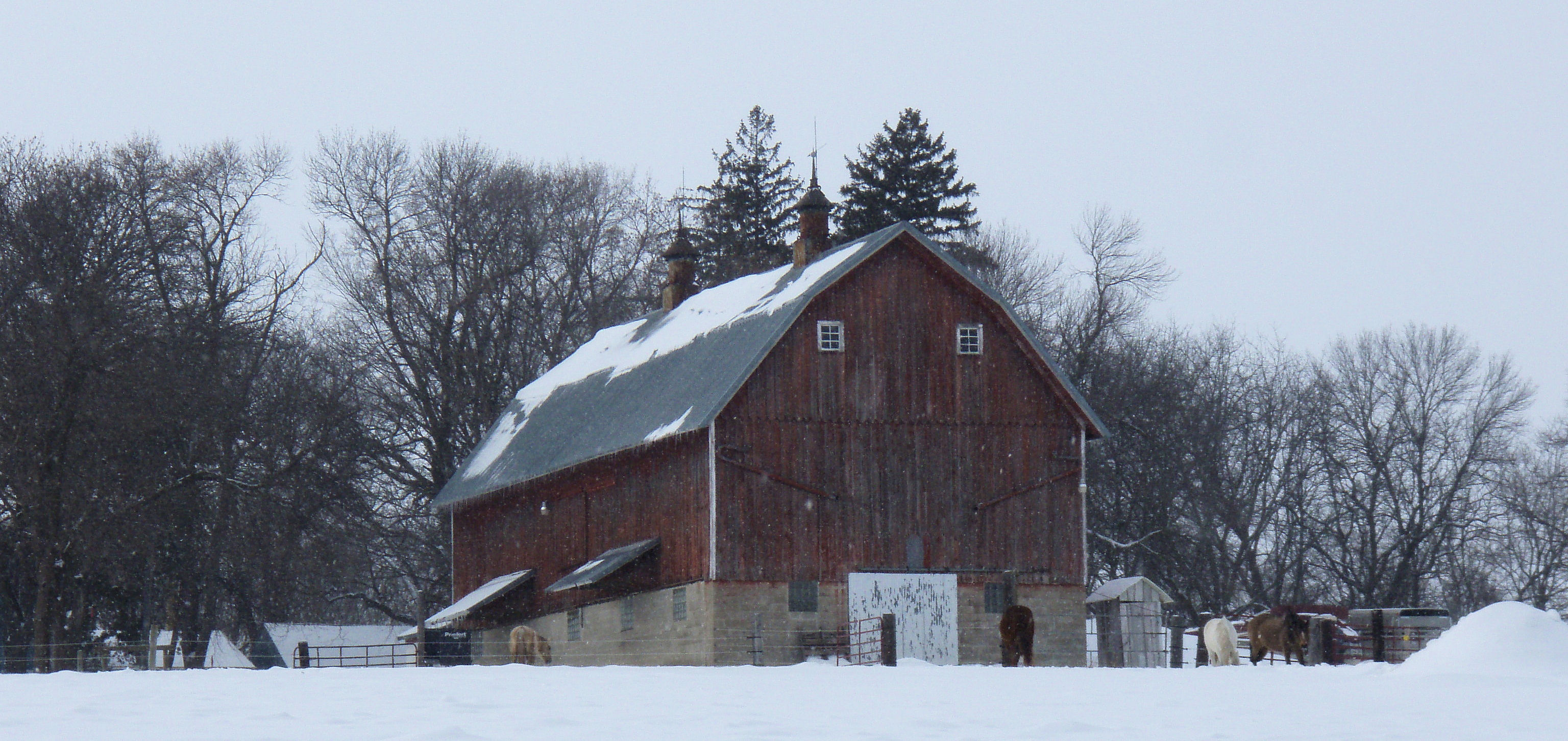
- 1914 Dairy Barn
- Established: 2013
- Location: 8060 MN-5, Waconia, MN 55387
- Type: Open air museum
- Executive director: Wendy Biorn
- Website: Website

The Andrew Peterson Farmstead is a farm just east of Waconia, Minnesota, United States. The farm is located in rural Carver County, Minnesota, on Minnesota State Highway 5. The farm is listed on the National Register of Historic Places for its association with its first owner, Andrew Peterson. It is owned and operated by the Carver County Historical Society.

== History ==
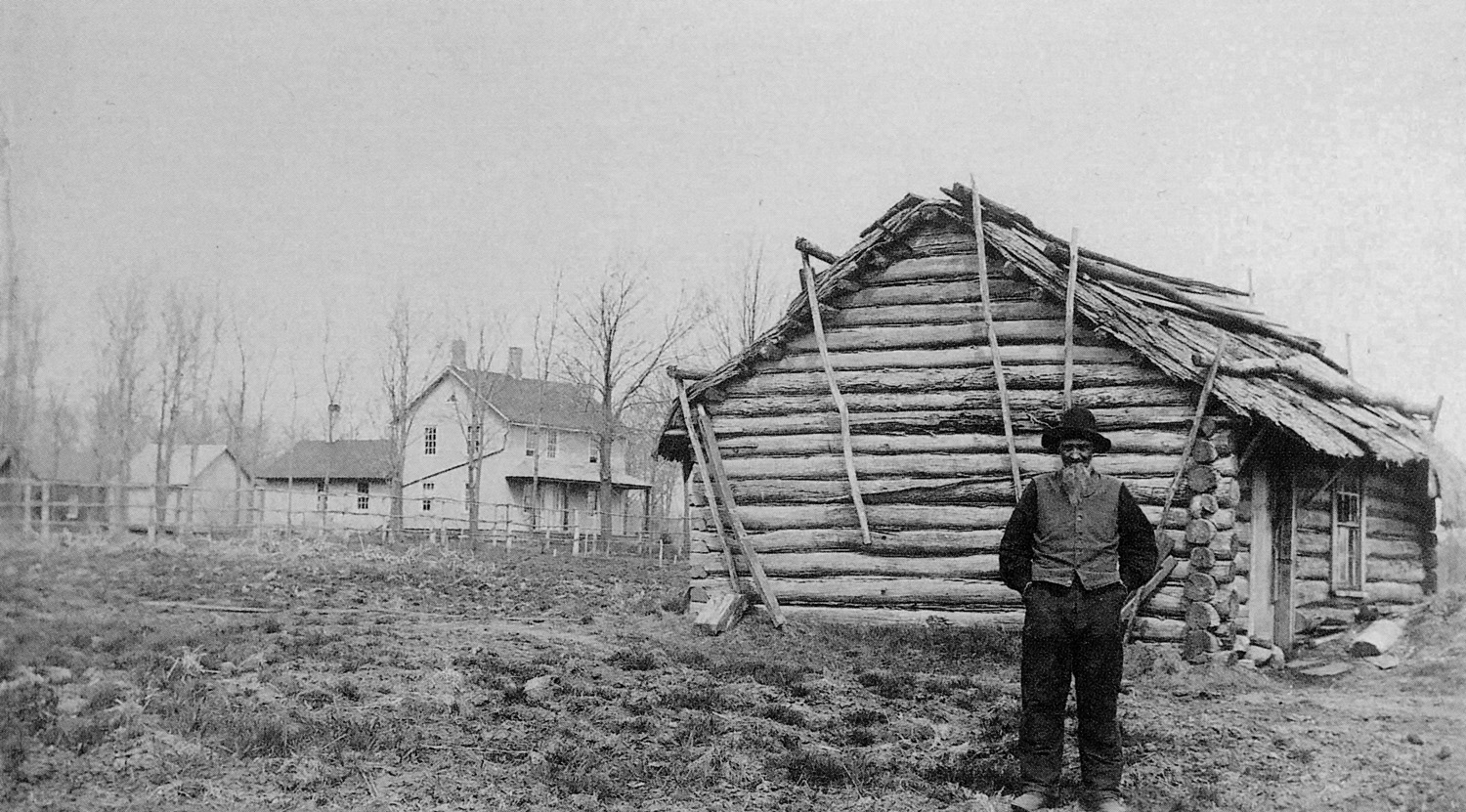
Andrew Peterson on the farm in 1885

Andrew Peterson (Anders Pettersson) was born October 20, 1818, at Västra Ryd parish in Ydre härad, Östergötland, Sweden. He died March 31, 1898, in Waconia, Carver County, Minnesota. He emigrated from Rydsnäs, Sweden to American in 1850. With his sister and fourteen other emigrants, they arrived in Boston on July 2, 1850. He arrived in Burlington, Iowa, about four weeks later and lived there for four years. He later moved to Minnesota in 1855, claiming 160 acres (65 ha) near the southeastern shore of Lake Waconia.

He kept a series of daily diaries and ledgers dating from 1850 until a few days until his death in 1898. Peterson's diary was donated by his family to the Minnesota Historical Society in 1939. These writings provided inspiration for Vilhelm Moberg's novels The Emigrants, Unto a Good Land, The Settlers, and The Last Letter Home, although they were set in Chisago County, Minnesota. While Andrew Peterson is not familiar to many Americans, his story is well known in Sweden. The Andrew Peterson Society was established in Sweden in 2003. A musical called Andrew Peterson: The Genuine Pioneer Story had great success in Sweden in 2012. In 2007 a tour group came from Sweden to visit the farm.

The property’s last owner was Ward Holasek. Despite being unaware of its historical value when he purchased the property he later collaborated with Jo Mihelich, author of the 1984 book, Andrew Peterson and the Scandia Story, to preserve numerous artifacts and structures, ultimately leading to the property being listed on the National Register of Historic Places in 1978.

Following Holasek's passing in 2013, he bequeathed a 51-acre portion of the land to the Carver County Historical Society. The will was contested, by Holasek's sons but a complicated settlement was reached, where a property swap was agreed upon.

The contested 51-acre portion only included one historic building, the north barn. The remaining twenty acres, which housed the other historic structures, including the house, were owned by Holasek's sons. Both parties eventually collaborated to reach a mutually beneficial agreement. The Carver County Historical Society retained 12.17 acres along with all the historic structures and included Andrew Petersons' original acreage, while the sons retained the larger remaining portion of land with the newer non-historic buildings.

== Restoration and reuse as a museum and interpretive center ==
In 2006, the Carver County Historical Society initiated restoration efforts on the farmstead by focusing on the granary, with additional assistance from Swedish carpenters. Subsequently, storm damage in July and August of 2010 caused the collapse of the east wall and gables of the North Barn, leading to stabilization measures with funding from county and Minnesota Legacy grants, to safeguard the remaining structure for future restoration endeavors. Subsequent funding was secured to restore and reinforce the foundation of the North Barn, paving the way for its potential transformation into a public park facility.

Modern restoration activities have included both maintaining historic accuracy and meeting current building codes. Museum administrators emphasize the importance of recognizing the continuum of local history represented at the site, including Indigenous stories and more recent agricultural developments.

Restoration of the house is currently in progress. The effort aims to return the house to its appearance in 1885, following historical photographs and documentation. Work is guided by building codes, State Historic Preservation Office requirements, and input from architects, engineers, and stonemasons.

A major fundraising campaign raised $750,000, including a $250,000 matching grant from the Jeffris Family Foundation, enabling the restoration to move ahead after delays caused by the COVID-19 pandemic. Progress is challenged by structural issues, like the positioning of the original chimney and layers from past renovations, which require review and careful documentation to preserve the site’s history and function.

Accessibility upgrades are also being designed for the site, such as ramps and wider doorways, to ensure public access while maintaining historic character.

== Programming and Exhibits ==
The historical society expects to increase public events and educational programming once work is complete on the restoration of the farmstead. Currently the historical society offers regular public tours, educational programs, and special events on site. Programming often includes tours of both the farm buildings and the neighboring Scandia Cemetery, and features exhibits drawn from Peterson’s diaries, as well as broader agricultural and horticultural history.

== Note ==
This article contains information obtained from the Swedish Wikipedia article Andrew Peterson.

== Related reading ==
- Mihelich, Josephine (1984) Andrew Peterson and the Scandia story (Ford Johnson Graphics) ISBN 978-0917907005

== See also ==
- List of museums in Minnesota
