= Lake Waconia =

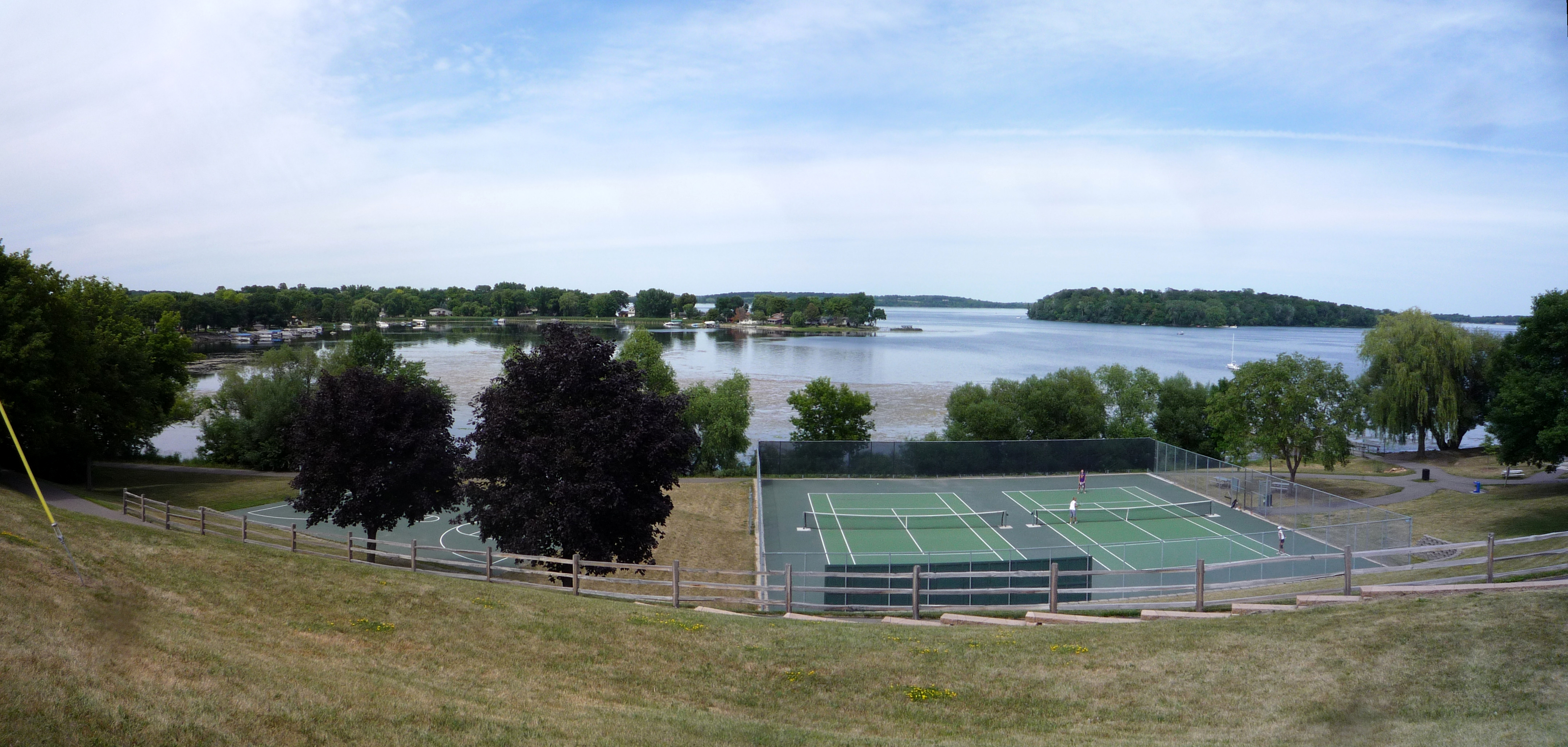
- Lake Waconia, Waconia, Minnesota, USA.

- Location within Minnesota
- Location: Waconia Township/Laketown Township, Carver County, Minnesota
- Coordinates: 44°52′7″N 93°47′2″W
- Type: Lake
- Etymology: Sioux word for "fountain"

Lake Waconia is a lake located partly in Waconia Township and partly in Laketown Township, in Carver County, Minnesota in the United States.

Waconia is derived from a Sioux-language word meaning "fountain" or "spring".
