= PUF (disambiguation) =

PUF is short for Presses Universitaires de France, a French publishing house.

It may also refer to:

- Physical unclonable function, in computer security, a physically implemented secure identifier
- Permanent University Fund, for Texas public universities
- Pau Pyrénées Airport in France (IATA code: PUF)
- Por Um Fio, a Brazilian reality television show
- Poughkeepsie Underwear Factory, a historic building in New York
- Public Universal Friend (1752–1819), American preacher
