= Brinkhaus Saloon Livery Barn (Chaska, Minnesota) =

Historic saloon livery stable in Chaska, Minnesota

- U.S. National Register of Historic Places
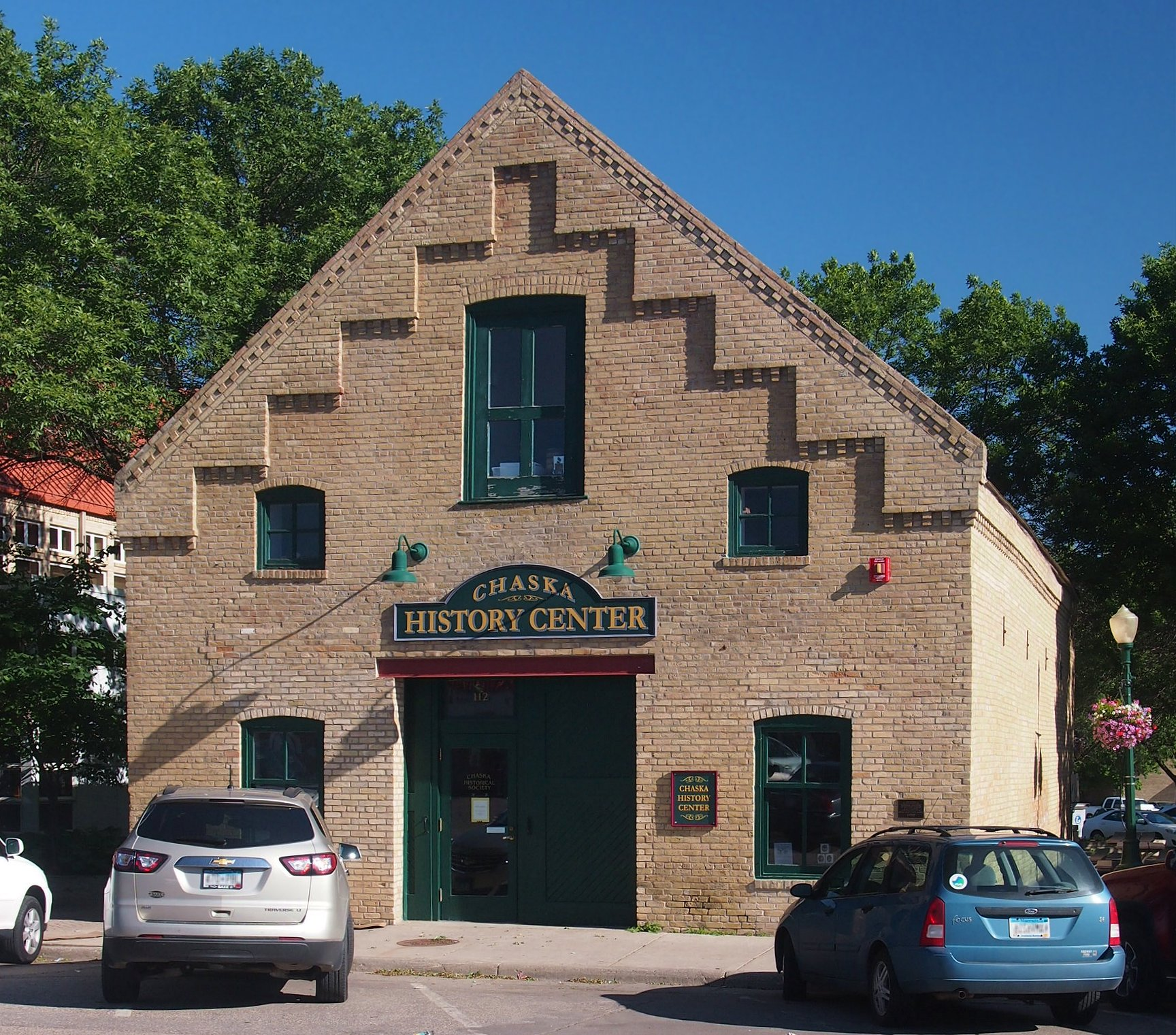
- The Chaska History Center (formerly the Brinkhaus Saloon Livery Barn), located at 112 West 4th Street in Chaska, Minnesota.

- Location within Minnesota Location within the United States
- Location: 112 West 4th Street, Chaska, Minnesota, 55318.
- Coordinates: 44°47′14.3″N 93°36′06.2″W
- Built: 1875
- Website: https://www.chaskahistory.org/
- NRHP reference No.: 80001962
- Added to NRHP: January 4, 1980

The Brinkhaus Saloon Livery Barn is a historic saloon livery stable made of Chaska brick located in Chaska, Minnesota. The building is listed on the National Register of Historic Places for Carver County, Minnesota and is the current headquarters of the Chaska Historical Society.

== History ==
=== Early history ===
The Brinkhaus saloon, also called the Minneapolis House and Saloon was a bar and hotel located in Chaska, Minnesota which was owned and operated by Herman Brinkhaus (1831–1903), a local German American immigrant from Coesfeld, Germany. Brinkhaus was a notable pioneer to the city of Chaska as well as a veteran of the American Civil War, serving with Company B of the 1st Minnesota Heavy Artillery Regiment. Brinkhaus's Minneapolis House hotel was erected in 1872, an adjoining livery was later added in 1875 to accommodate horses. The frame for the building was originally made of wood, however, following a fire in the 1890s the wooden frame was replaced by the iconic local Chaska brick.

According to the National Register of Historic Places the livery was rented out to James Francis Dilley (1841–1919), a fellow Civil War veteran and representative to the state legislature in 1873 and 1876–77. Dilley not only quartered horses and rented bitting rigs, but provided "bus" service to various locations in Chaska and held mail contracts between Chaska and numerous Carver County communities.

=== Later Use ===
For many years the livery was utilized as a blacksmith garage before it was sold to Frank Salden (1911–1993) in the 1970s who converted it into a bus garage which catered to the Chaska school system. The livery was later converted into a hardware store and automotive part retailer which was owned by the General Trading Company (GTC), a local hardware business headquartered in Saint Paul, Minnesota. The city of Chaska purchased the livery as part of an extension of the City Hall Plaza in 2003.

== The Livery ==
According to a 1978 survey of the property:

"The Livery Barn is a two story rectangular-shaped structure constructed of buff-colored Chaska brick. The steep pitch of the roof is accentuated by stepped corbelling in the front gable end. A brick coping rises above the roof at the same end. A decorative brick panel runs the length of the roof base. The windows and hayloft door retain segmentally arched window hoods and stone sills. Diminutive six pane windows, once delineating stall sections, have retained their original appearance".

== National Register Criterion ==
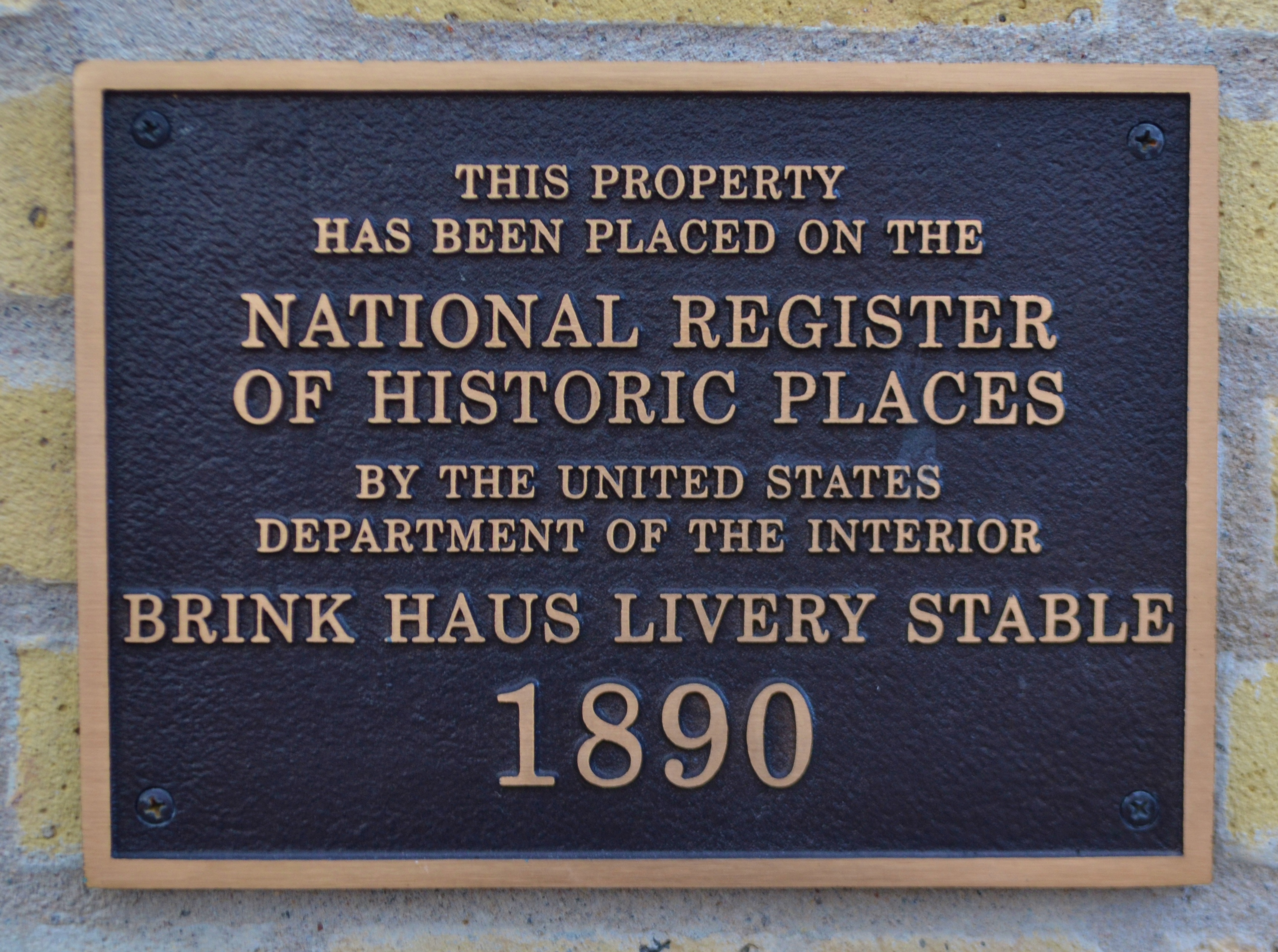
The Brinkhaus marker from the National Register of Historic Places.

The original January 1978 survey for the property states the following:

"The Brinkhaus Saloon Livery Barn is significant as a rare and extremely well-preserved example of one of Chaska's vanished businesses. This structure is a significant element in Chaska's varied commercial streetscape. This livery barn is reported to have been constructed shortly after Herman Brinkhaus built an adjoining hotel and saloon, the Minneapolis Hotel, in 1872. For many years the livery business was rented to James Dilley, a Civil War veteran and representative to the state legislature (1873 and 1876-77). Dilley not only quartered horses and rented rigs but provided "bus" service to various locations in Chaska and held mail contracts between Chaska and numerous Carver County communities. This structure is in an excellent state of preservation and fittingly provides a 20th century transportation need to Chaska residents".

== The Chaska History Center ==
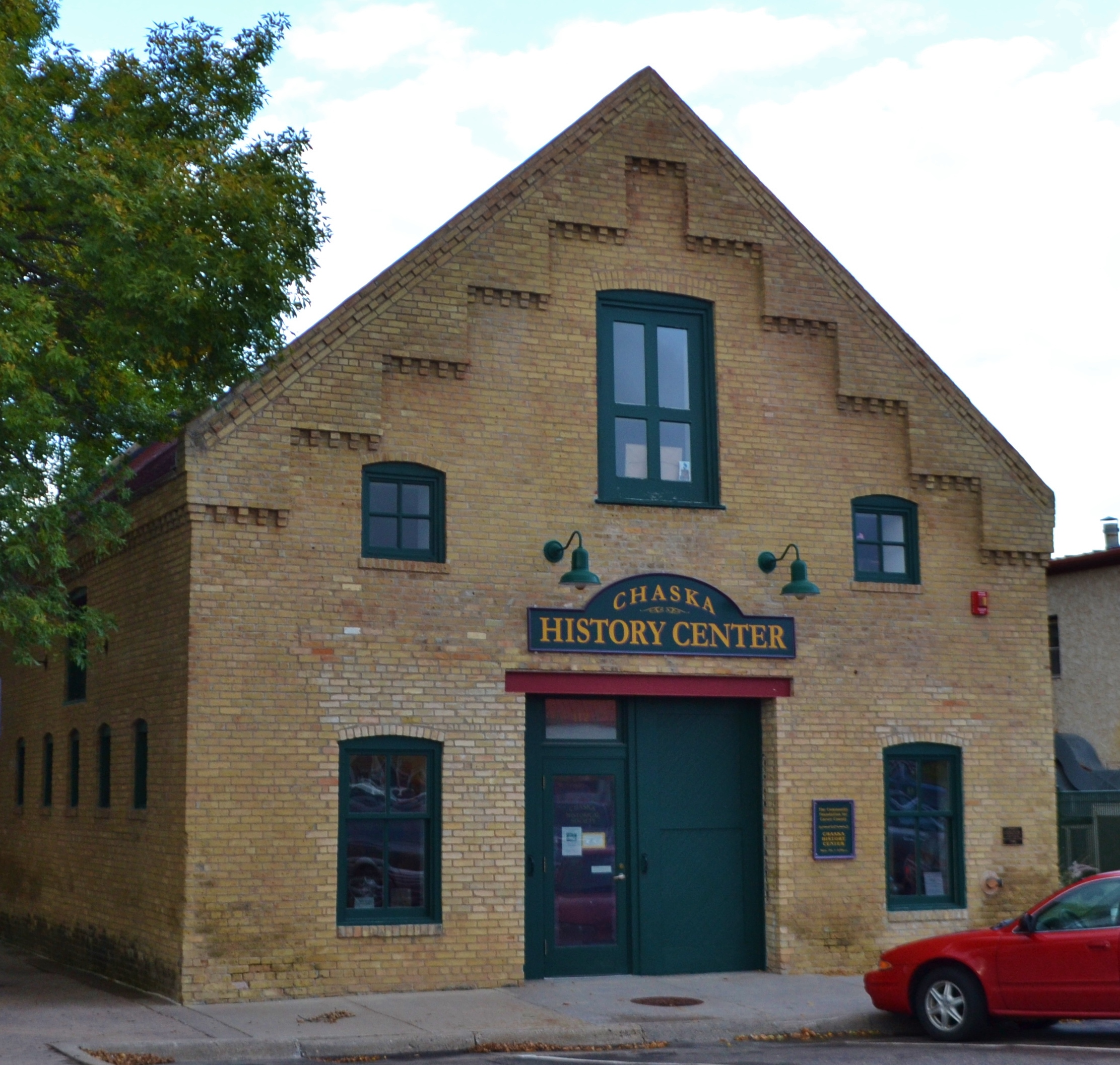
Front of the Brinkhaus livery.

The Chaska History Center, also called the Chaska Historical Society, has been in existence since 1980, the historical society was originally housed on the second and third floors of the Christian P. Klein mansion, located on the northeast corner of 4th Street and Walnut Street in Chaska since 1988. The Chaska History Center moved into the Brinkhaus stable in 2003 and has since been located within the building. Between 2003 and 2012 the livery went through several different stages of renovation costing upwards of $500,000 in order to keep the building as original as possible.

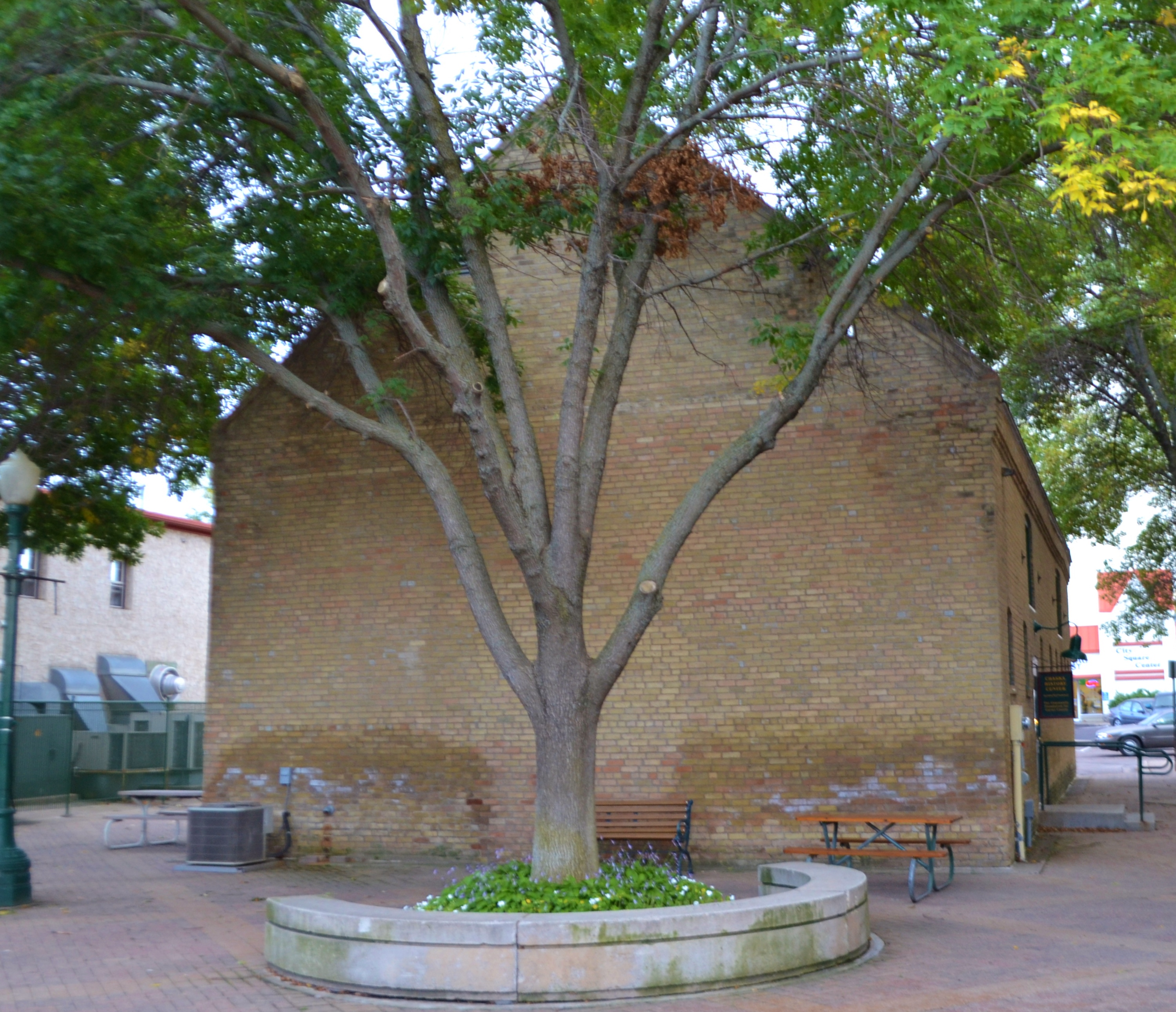
Rear of the Brinkhaus livery.
