= Frederick E. DuToit =

Minnesota politician (1845–1922)

Frederick Eugene DuToit
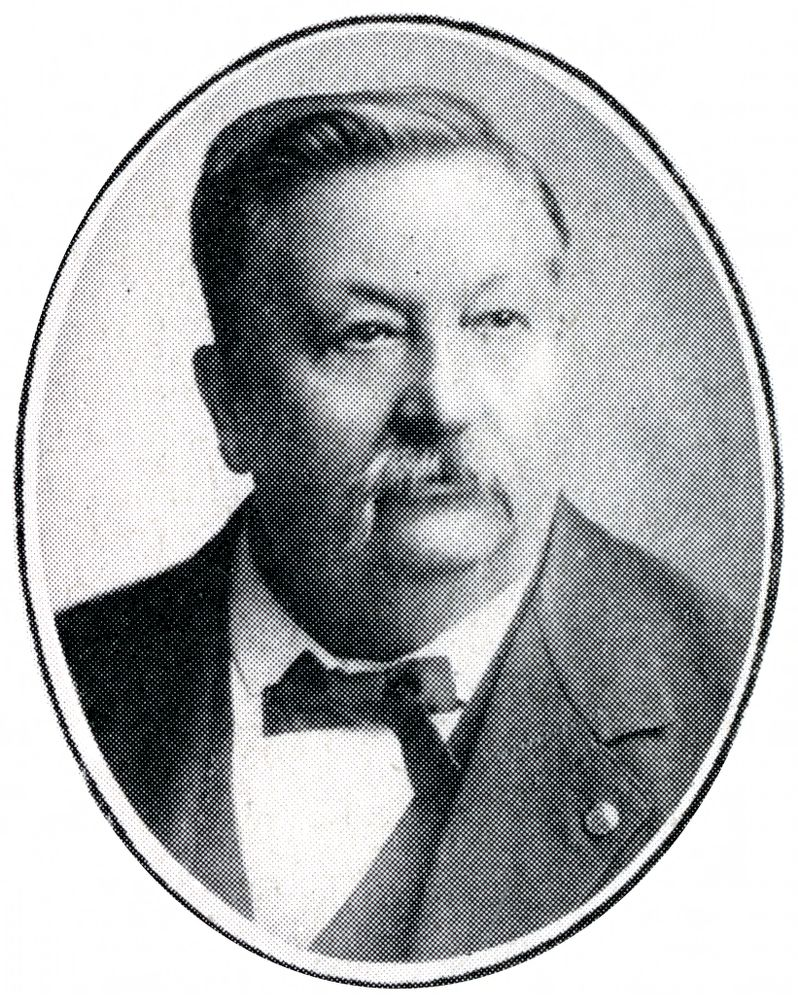
- DuToit in 1907

Member of the Minnesota Legislature from the 33rd district
- In office January 2, 1872 – January 6, 1873
- Governor: Horace Austin

Member of the Minnesota Senate from the 25th district
- In office January 3, 1899 - January 1, 1911
- Governor: John Lind; Samuel Rinnah Van Sant; John Albert Johnson; Adolph Olson Eberhart

Personal details
- Born: September 24, 1845 Harrisville, New York
- Died: May 22, 1922 (aged 76) Chaska, Minnesota
- Resting place: Guardian Angels Cemetery; Chaska, Minnesota
- Other political affiliations: Minnesota Democratic Party
- Spouse(s): Josephine Bury; Ann Marie Kunz
- Children: 3
- Occupation: Politician, mayor, sheriff

Military service
- Allegiance: United States; Minnesota
- Branch/service: Union Army
- Years of service: 1861-1865
- Rank: Second Lieutenant
- Unit: Company A, 4th Minnesota Infantry Regiment; Company C, 1st Minnesota Heavy Artillery Regiment
- Battles/wars: American Civil War: Siege of Corinth; Battle of Iuka; Second Battle of Corinth; Garrison duty in Chattanooga

Frederick Eugene DuToit (September 24, 1845 - May 22, 1922), sometimes written as Dutoit or Du Toit, was a Minnesota politician, American Civil War veteran, newspaper printer, and the Mayor of Chaska, Minnesota. During his lifetime DuToit was a member of both the Minnesota Legislature and the Minnesota Senate. DuToit was also elected as the County Commissioner of Carver County, Minnesota, the Sheriff of Carver County, and the Superintendent of Carver County schools.

== Early life ==
Frederick Eugene DuToit was born on September 24, 1845, in Harrisville, New York, he was the son of Frederick C. DuToit, a merchant from Moudon, Switzerland, and Eliza Gressett, from France, who were married in France and immigrated to the United States in 1841. DuToit's father relocated to Chaska in Minnesota Territory in 1856. DuToit grew up with a common school education and worked for much of his childhood and early adult years as a printer's devil (an apprentice) for the Belle Plaine Enquirer newspaper of the city of Belle Plaine, Minnesota in neighboring Scott County.

== Military career ==
During the American Civil War DuToit volunteered for service with a militia company of United States Volunteers nicknamed the "Carver Grays". The Carver Grays along with the "Scott Guards" of Scott County, Minnesota composed the ranks of Company A of the 4th Minnesota Infantry Regiment. Company A was commanded by Captain Luther Loren Baxter who was later a prominent Minnesota politician and wrote for the Glencoe Register newspaper.

DuToit was mustered into service as a Private on October 4, 1861. By December 1862 DuToit had been promoted to the rank of Sergeant in Company A and had seen action at the Siege of Corinth, the Battle of Iuka, and the Second Battle of Corinth. In October 1862 DuToit was given a field commission to the rank of Second Lieutenant and was transferred to Company C of the 1st Minnesota Heavy Artillery Regiment under his previous company commander, now Colonel, Luther Loren Baxter. DuToit was mustered out of federal service on July 1, 1865.

== The Chaska Herald ==
Following the war in 1865 DuToit worked for the Valley Herald newspaper office, eventually becoming the printer, owner, and editor. The Herald was originally created by Charles Adams Warner and Morris Craw Russell of Carver County. In 1866 Warner sold the Herald to DuToit, who worked at the printing office until his death in 1922. Du Toit's son, Frederick, also worked for the Herald for much of his life. The office in Chaska, the Herald Block, is listed on the National Register of Historic Places.

== Political career ==
In 1867 Frederick DuToit began his political career as a member of the Minnesota Democratic Party, being elected to the position of municipal clerk for Chaska, a position he held from 1867 to 1869. DuToit was later elected as Carver County Commissioner, serving from 1869 to 1871.

Starting in 1871 DuToit ran for office in the Minnesota Legislature representing the 33rd District for the Minnesota House of Representatives. DuToit won the 1871 election and represented Carver County in the 14th Minnesota Legislative Session (1872) and was a part of the enrollment committee, the joint printing committee, and the railroads committee. One year later DuToit ran again for the same office and won the 1872 election representing the 33rd District in Carver County in the 15th Minnesota Legislative Session (1873). Later in 1898 DuToit ran for the Minnesota Senate representing the 25th District, he was elected successfully and would hold this office consecutively for the 25th Senatorial District of Minnesota from 1899 to 1911. During this time DuToit served on the committee for Grain and Warehouses, Legislative Expenses, Municipal Corporations, Public Lands, Public Parks, Railroads, and the Minnesota State Soldiers Home (which he was also the Chairman of).

In 1873 DuToit ran for the office of Sheriff for the Carver County Sheriff's Office. DuToit would hold this office from 1874 to 1895 for 22 straight years. According to the book The Sheriffs of Carver County: The First 150 Years: 1855-2005 by John von Walter “Frederick DuToit served as sheriff during the July 4, 1876 celebration of the Amercian Centennial and oversaw partying revelers. Later that summer, in mid-August, 1876, members of the Jesse James-Younger Brothers Gang arrived in Minnesota in two groups and were checking out small town banks for the right one to rob”.

DuToit retired from his position as Sheriff in January 1895 at age 55 choosing to instead focus on his role as a newspaper editor from 1895 to 1898 for the Herald. DuToit's last office he ran for was the position of Mayor of Chaska in 1910.

== Later life, personal life, and death ==
In his later years DuToit was the President of the Chaska Commercial Club, the Director of the Minneapolis Sugar Company, and was involved in Civil War veterans memorial activities with the GAR (Grand Army of the Republic). DuToit had two wives, he was first married to Josephine Bury (1845–1881) and later to Anna Marie Kunz (1858–1942), together DuToit had 3 total children.

In November 1921 DuToit was diagnosed with jaundice, from which he never fully recovered from. DuToit died a year later on May 22, 1922, in Chaska and is buried with his family at the Guardian Angels Church cemetery in Chaska.

DuToit's great-great-granddaughter is Tracy Swanson (née: DuToit) who served as the Mayor of Chaska from 1974 to 1984, Tracy also served as the Commissioner of Carver County from 1986 to 2004 and the President of the Chaska Historical Society from 1980 to 2015.

== Legacy ==
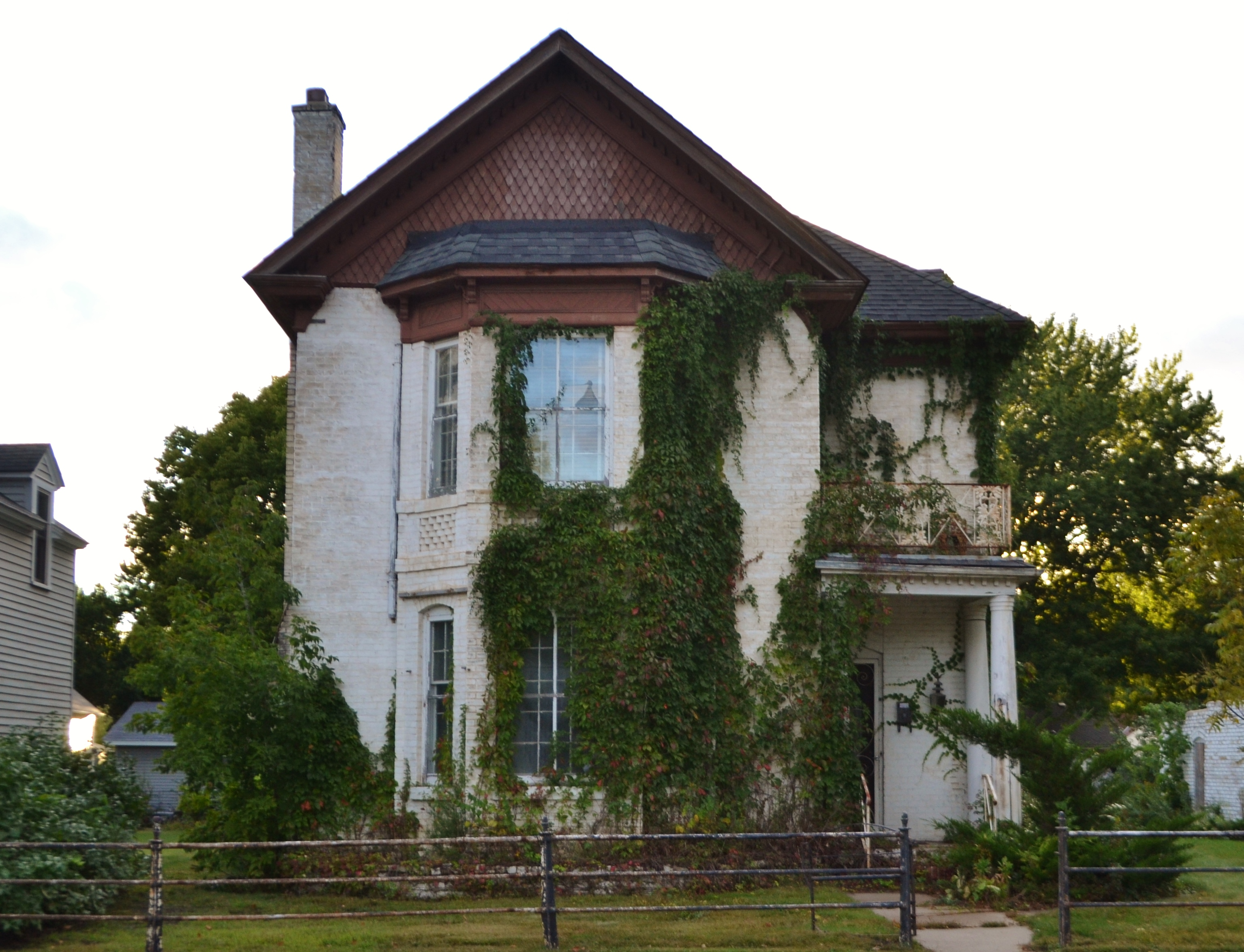
The Frederick E. DuToit House at 121 North Hickory Street in Chaska

The Frederick E. DuToit House in Chaska is located at 121 North Hickory Street. It was constructed in 1870 and is made of the regionally famous Chaska brick. According to the National Register of Historic Places database:

"The irregular plan of the house is accentuated by porch projections multi-gabled roof, two story bay window on the front facade, and a portico at the intersection of its two main axes. Decorative features that have been retained since its construction include segmentally arched window hoods and decorative brick panels".

The house was listed in 1978 on the National Register of Historic Places and is still maintained as a historical residence.
