= Richmond Congregational Church =

Historic church in Vermont, United States

- U.S. National Register of Historic Places
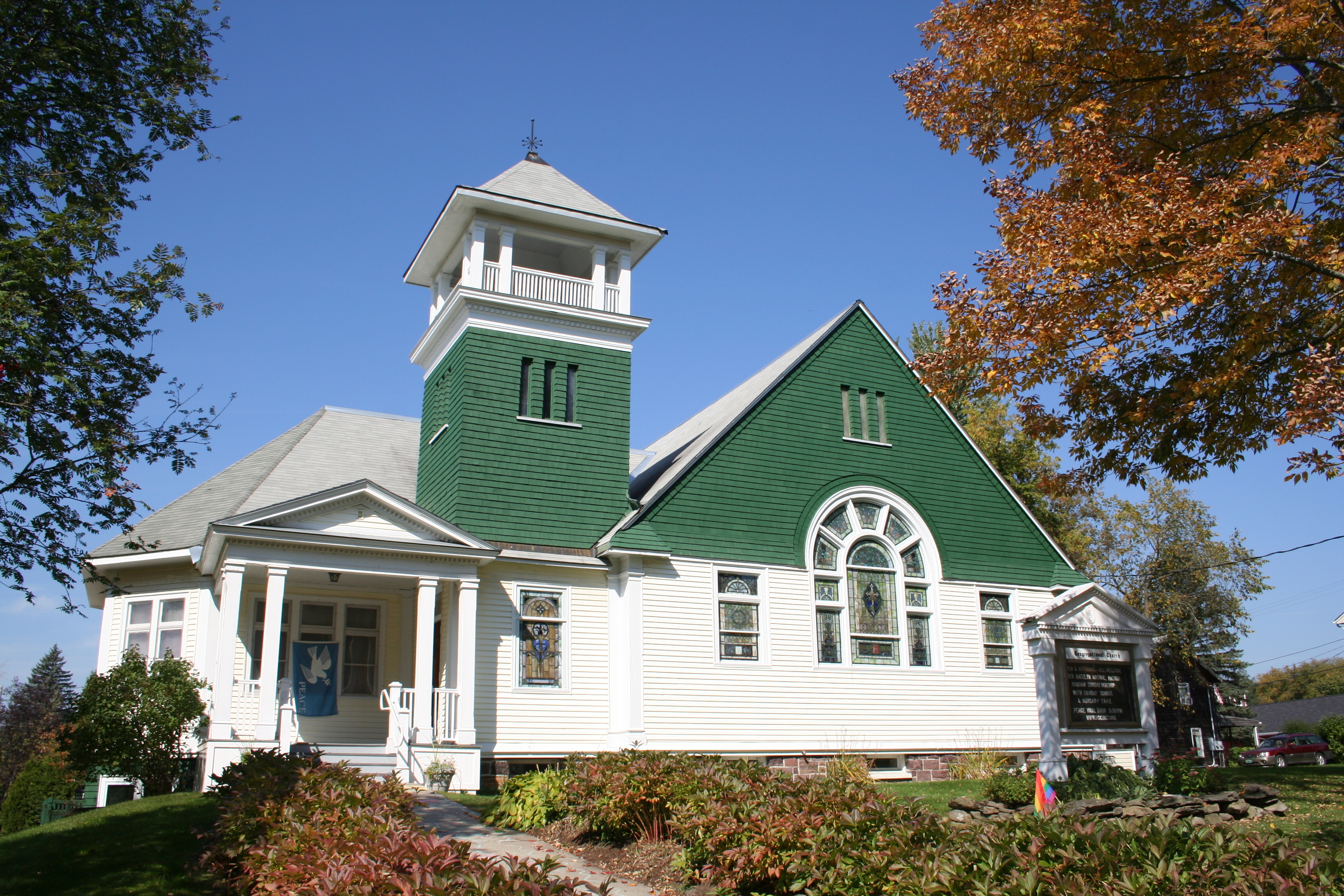

- Location within Vermont Location within the United States
- Location: 20 Church St., Richmond, Vermont
- Coordinates: 44°24′14″N 72°59′46″W
- Area: less than one acre
- Built: 1903
- Architect: Willcox, Walter R.B.
- Architectural style: Colonial Revival
- NRHP reference No.: 01000326
- Added to NRHP: March 29, 2001

The Richmond Congregational Church is a historic church at 20 Church Street in Richmond, Vermont, United States. Built in 1903-04, it is a significant local example of Colonial Revival architecture, designed by prominent Vermont architect Walter R. B. Willcox. It was listed on the National Register of Historic Places in 2001. The congregation is affiliated with the United Church of Christ; the minister is Rev. Katelyn Macrae.

== Architecture and history ==
The Richmond Congregation Church stands in the town's main village, at the northwest corner of Church and Bridge Streets. It is a two-story wood frame structure, with a basically cruciform plan. The main gable is oriented to face Bridge Street, while flanking hip-roof sections extend to the sides. At the rear, a hyphen attached to the northwest corner joins the church to its parish hall. The exterior is finished in a combination of wooden shingles and vinyl siding that closely resembles wooden clapboards. At the southwest corner of the cross, a square tower rises to an open belvedere and a flared pyramidal roof. To its left is the main entrance, sheltered by a gable-roofed porch with clustered square columns. The main gable end has a large multi-section stained glass window, with Palladian-style flanking sash windows that also have stained elements, with a transom pane above the moving sashes.

The church was built in 1903, during a period of significant growth in the town, occasioned by the recent construction of the Richmond Underwear Company factory. It was designed by Burlington architect Walter R.B. Willcox, then one of the few architects practicing in the state. Although the church has many fundamentally Colonial Revival features (including the porch architecture, basic cruciform symmetry, and the use of Palladian windows), it has often been classified as Queen Anne, owing to its asymmetrical appearance and mixed use of exterior finishes. The parish hall was added in 1984, and is in a sympathetic Colonial Revival style, designed by Burlington architect Donald Albertson.

== See also ==
- National Register of Historic Places listings in Chittenden County, Vermont
