= Frederick E. DuToit House =

Historic house in Chaska, Minnesota, US

- U.S. National Register of Historic Places
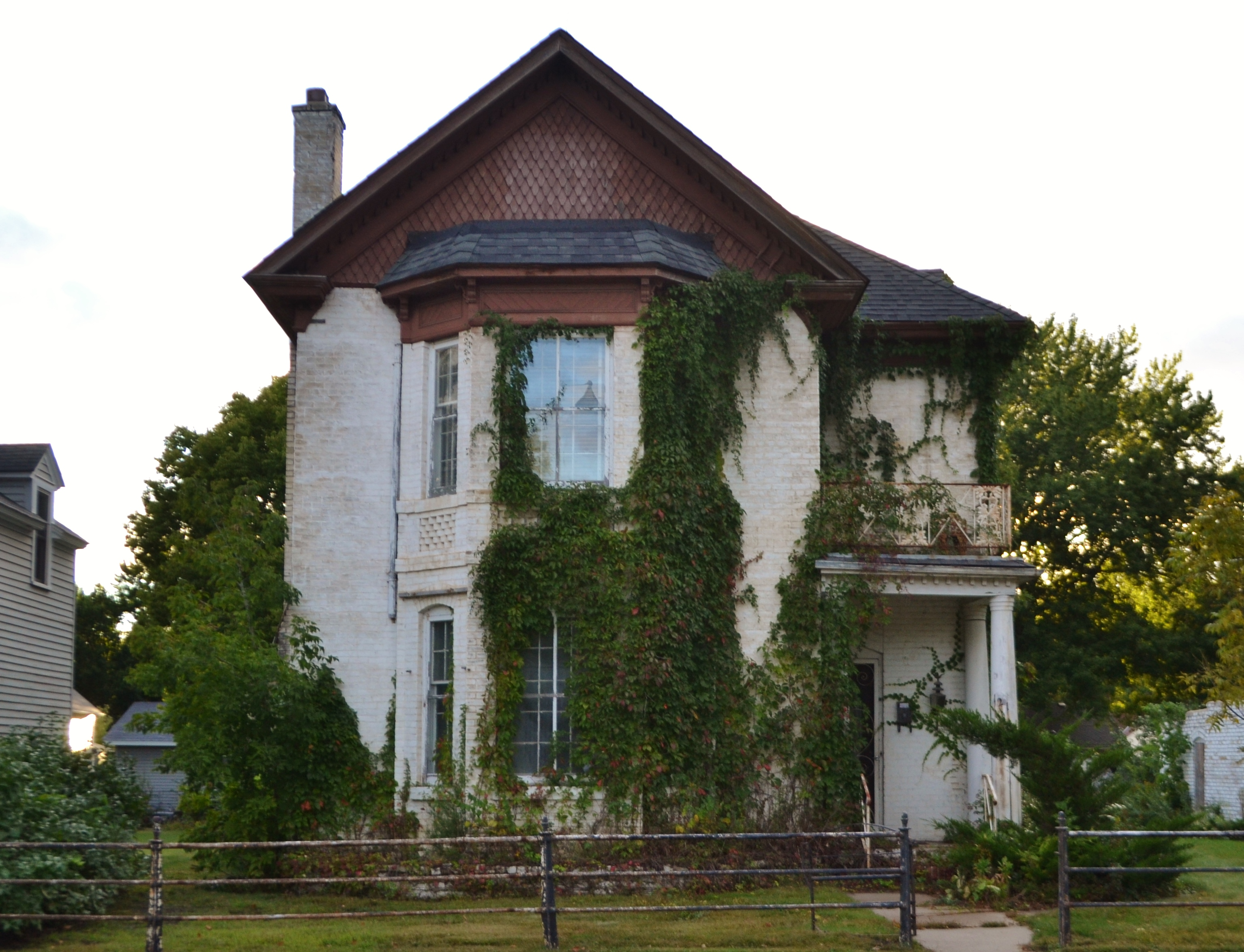
- The Frederick E. DuToit House in Chaska, Minnesota

- Location within Minnesota Location within the United States
- Location: 121 Hickory Street, Chaska, Minnesota, US
- Coordinates: 44°47′02.4″N 93°36′22.18″W
- Built: 1870
- MPS: Carver County Multiple Resource Area
- NRHP reference No.: 80001965
- Added to NRHP: January 4, 1980

The Frederick E. DuToit House is a historic home located in Chaska, Minnesota. It is listed on the National Register of Historic Places since 1980. The house is constructed from the regionally famous Chaska brick.

== History ==
Frederick E. DuToit (1845–1922), was a Minnesota politician, newspaper proprietor, American Civil War veteran, and the County Sheriff of Carver County, Minnesota. DuToit and his family were greatly responsible for and involved in the commercialization of Chaska along with local politics, education, and government.

== The house ==
According to the Carver County Historical Society, the house was constructed in 1870 and is primarily constructed from the buff colored Chaska brick and wood.

"The irregular plan of the house is accentuated by porch projections, multi-gabled roof, two story bay window on the front facade, and a portico at the intersection of its two main axes. Decorative features that have been retained since its construction include segmentally arched window hoods and decorative brick panels".

== National Register Criterion ==
According to the original 1980 survey of the Frederick E. DuToit House:

"The Frederick E. DuToit House is significant due to its association with the second generation of one of Chaska's leading families. Since 1855 the DuToit family has been involved with, and to a significant degree responsible for, Chaska's commercial growth - The well-preserved house has continuously been occupied by the DuToit family. Julianne DuToit Smith, granddaughter of Frederick E. DuToit, has preserved the house and a number of personal effects owned by her grandfather".

The house was listed in 1980 on the National Register of Historic Places and is still maintained as a historical residence. The house is also listed on the Carver County Mantorville Restoration Association (MRA) out of Mantorville, Minnesota.

== Gallery ==
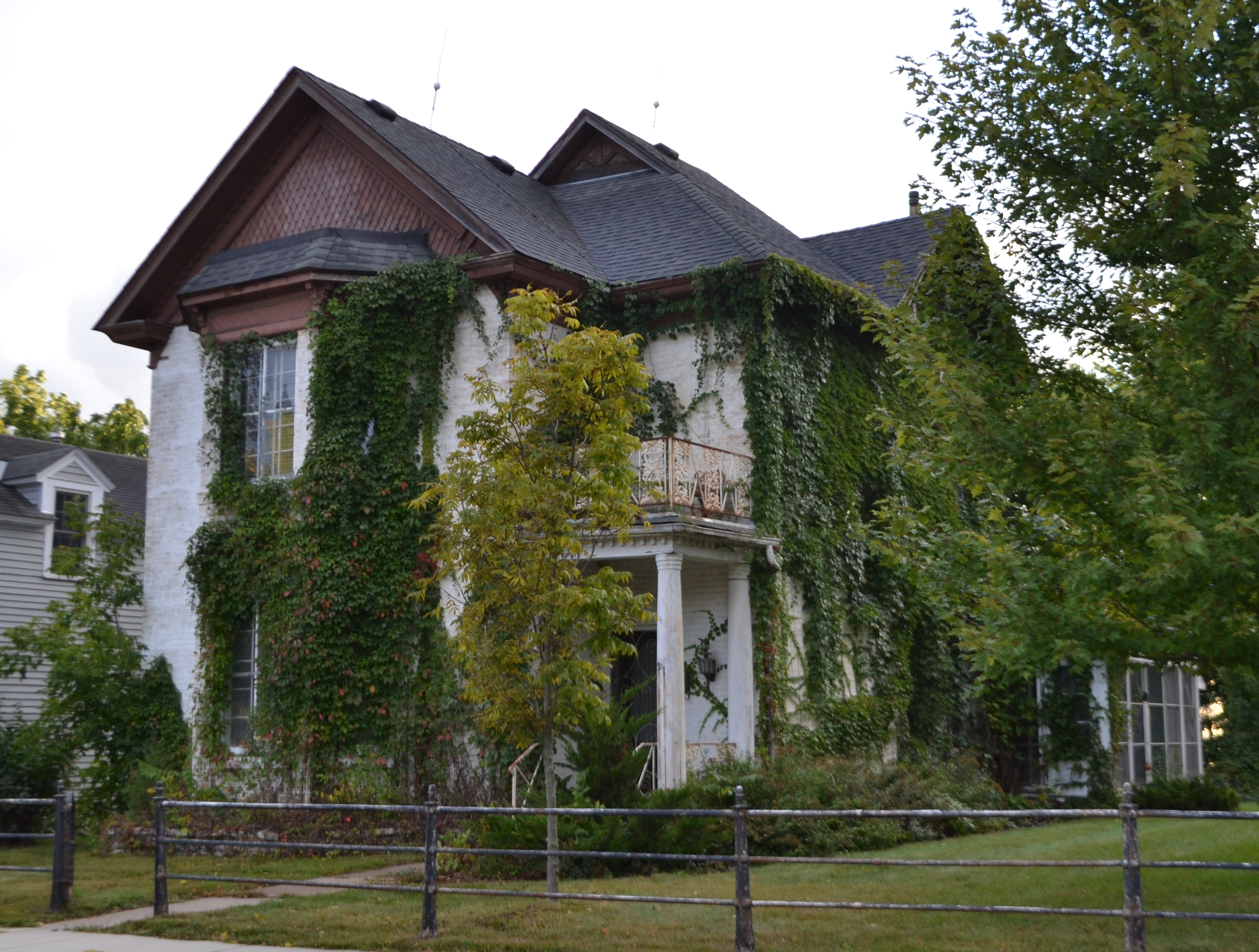
DuToit house front right

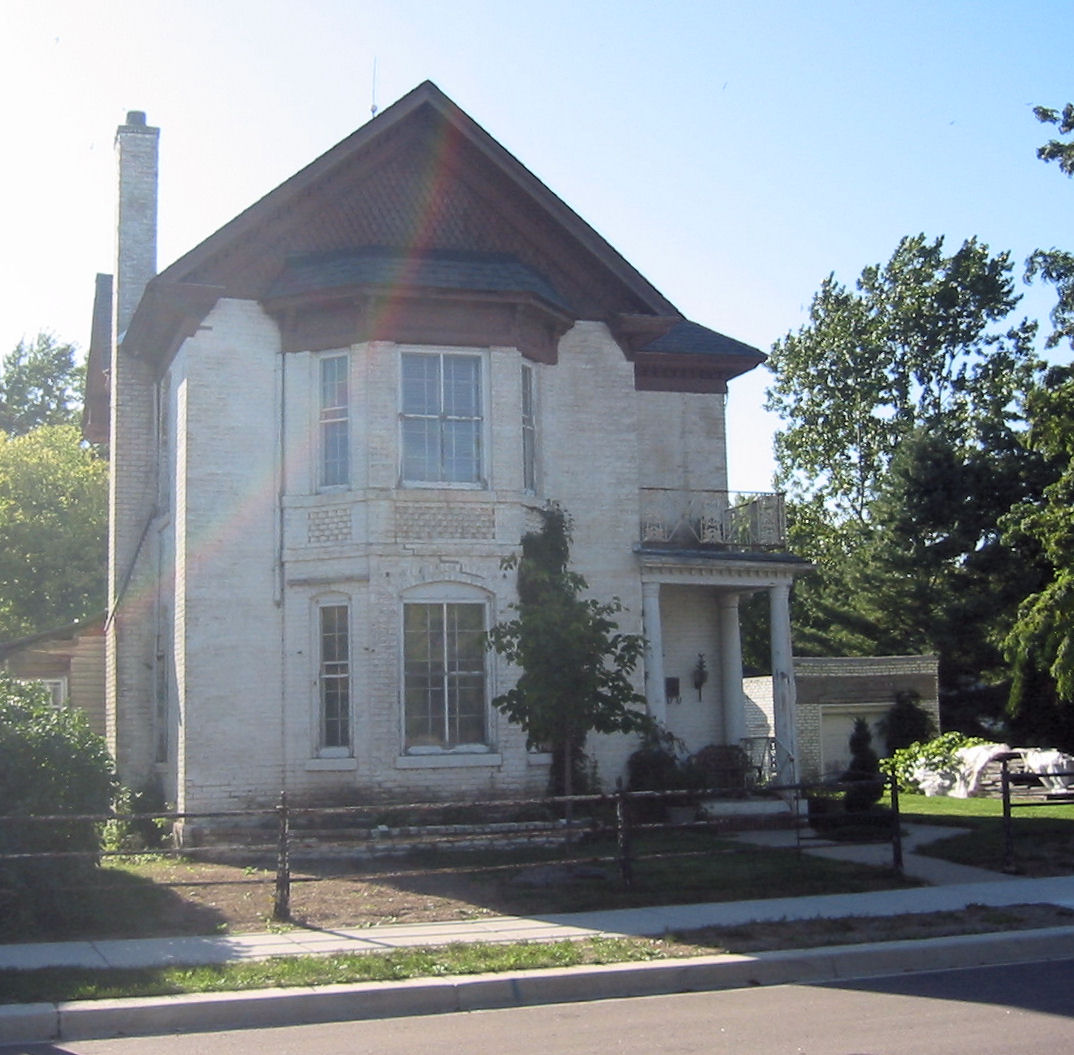
Dutoit house from the front

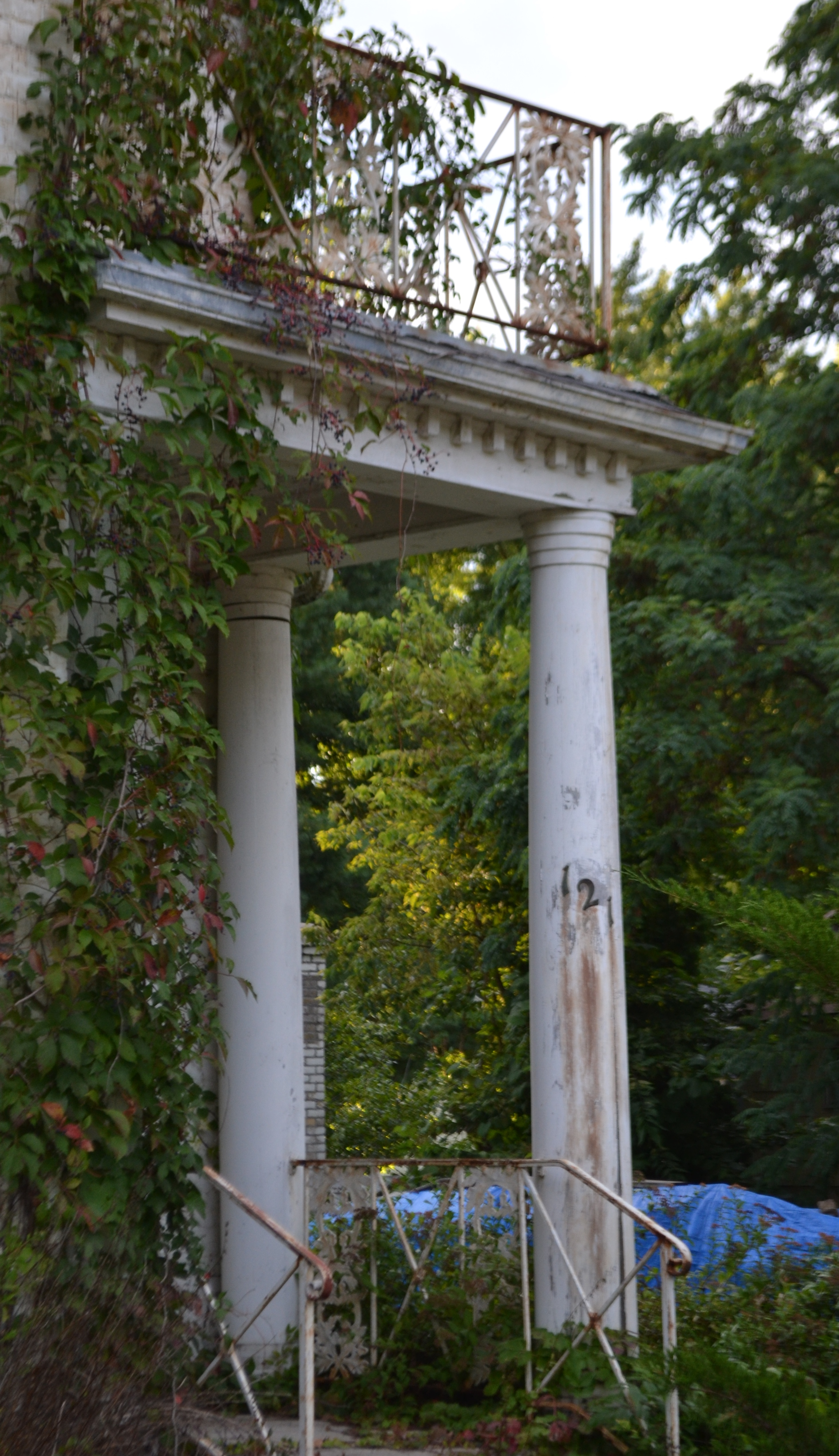
DutToit house columns

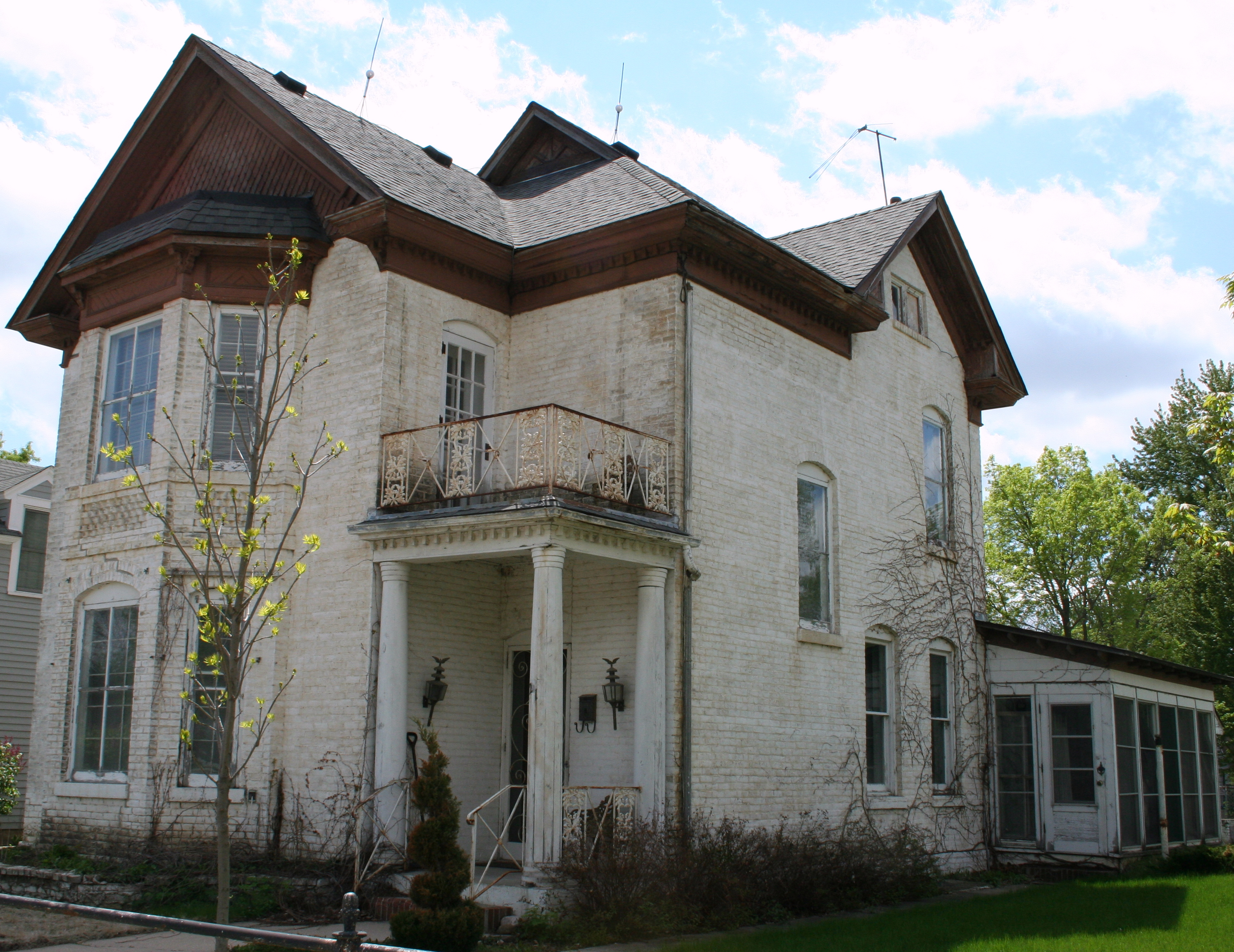
DuToit house after overgrowth removal
