= Northwestern Knitting Company Factory building =

Historic place in Minnesota, United States

- Northwestern Knitting Company Factory
- U.S. National Register of Historic Places
- Minneapolis Landmark
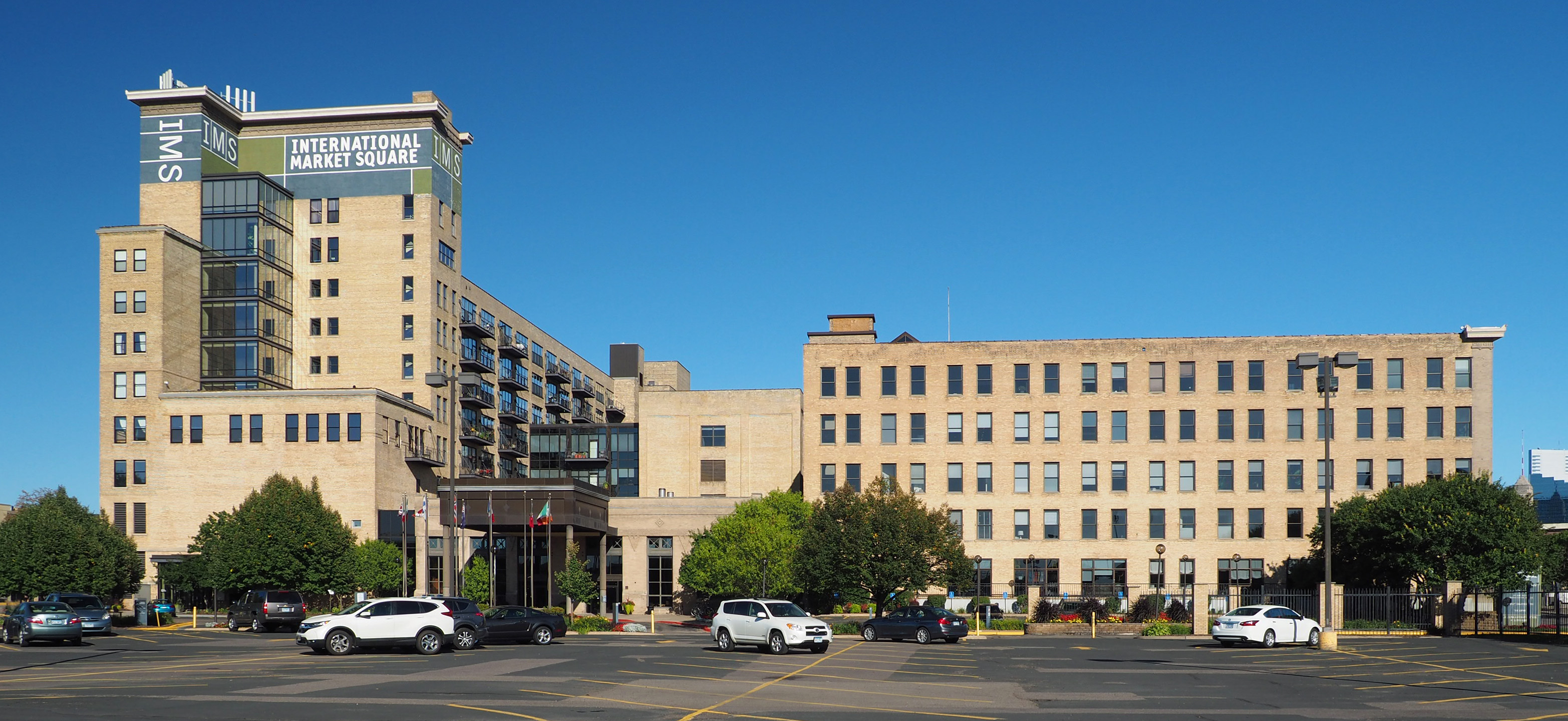
- The Northwestern Knitting Company Factory from the west

- Location within Minnesota Location within the United States
- Location: 718 Glenwood Ave., Minneapolis, Minnesota
- Coordinates: 44°58′50″N 93°17′18″W
- Built: 1904
- Architect: Bertrand & Chamberlain, John Wunder
- NRHP reference No.: 83000904

Significant dates
- Added to NRHP: June 3, 1983
- Designated MPLSL: 1984

The Northwestern Knitting Company Factory, also known as Munsingwear Corporation and later as International Market Square, is a former factory building in the Sumner-Glenwood neighborhood of Minneapolis. The company was founded in 1888 by George D. Munsing, who invented a method of plating wool fibers with silk and cotton to make the union suit more comfortable. The company received financial backing from Clinton Morrison and Charles Alfred Pillsbury, who were prominent businessmen in the Minneapolis flour milling industry. This style of underwear, patented in 1891, proved to be very popular, and the company eventually became the world's largest manufacturer of underwear. The company changed its name in 1919 to Munsingwear.

The company built five brick and concrete buildings between 1904 and 1915, eventually creating a complex covering 650,000 square feet (60,000 m^{2}) and employing up to 2000 workers. The five- to eight-story buildings had long rows of windows, and although the buildings mostly had a plain appearance, the architects added some details such as slightly projecting cornices, fretwork friezes, and fluted Doric columns. The oldest of the buildings, along Glenwood Avenue, is notable for being the city's first entirely reinforced concrete building. Engineer C.A.P. Turner used concrete columns shaped like a mushroom on top, and he eventually patented this process, which was widely used.

The brick used in the buildings' construction is the cream-colored Chaska Brick, popular as a building material at the time, quarried and manufactured in nearby Chaska, Minnesota.

The building also contains a unique double helix stairway, believed to be one of the first of its kind in the United States. Two stairways spiral around each other, creating a smooth transition where arriving workers went up one set of stairs and departing workers exited down the other.

The factory eventually closed in 1981 when the economy reduced demand for Munsingwear's products. In 1985, the buildings were renovated and the complex was renamed International Market Square, which housed offices, shops, and over 100 showrooms for home and office products. The renovation included a five-story atrium created by roofing over an old courtyard where rail tracks once served the complex. In 2005, some portions of the building were renovated into 96 loft apartments. This was a leading example of adaptive reuse in Minneapolis. The building was listed on the National Register of Historic Places in 1983.

== See also ==
- Poughkeepsie Underwear Factory: underwear factory on the NRHP
- Richmond Underwear Company Building: underwear factory on the NRHP
