= Herald Block =

Historic commercial building in Chaska, Minnesota

- U.S. National Register of Historic Places
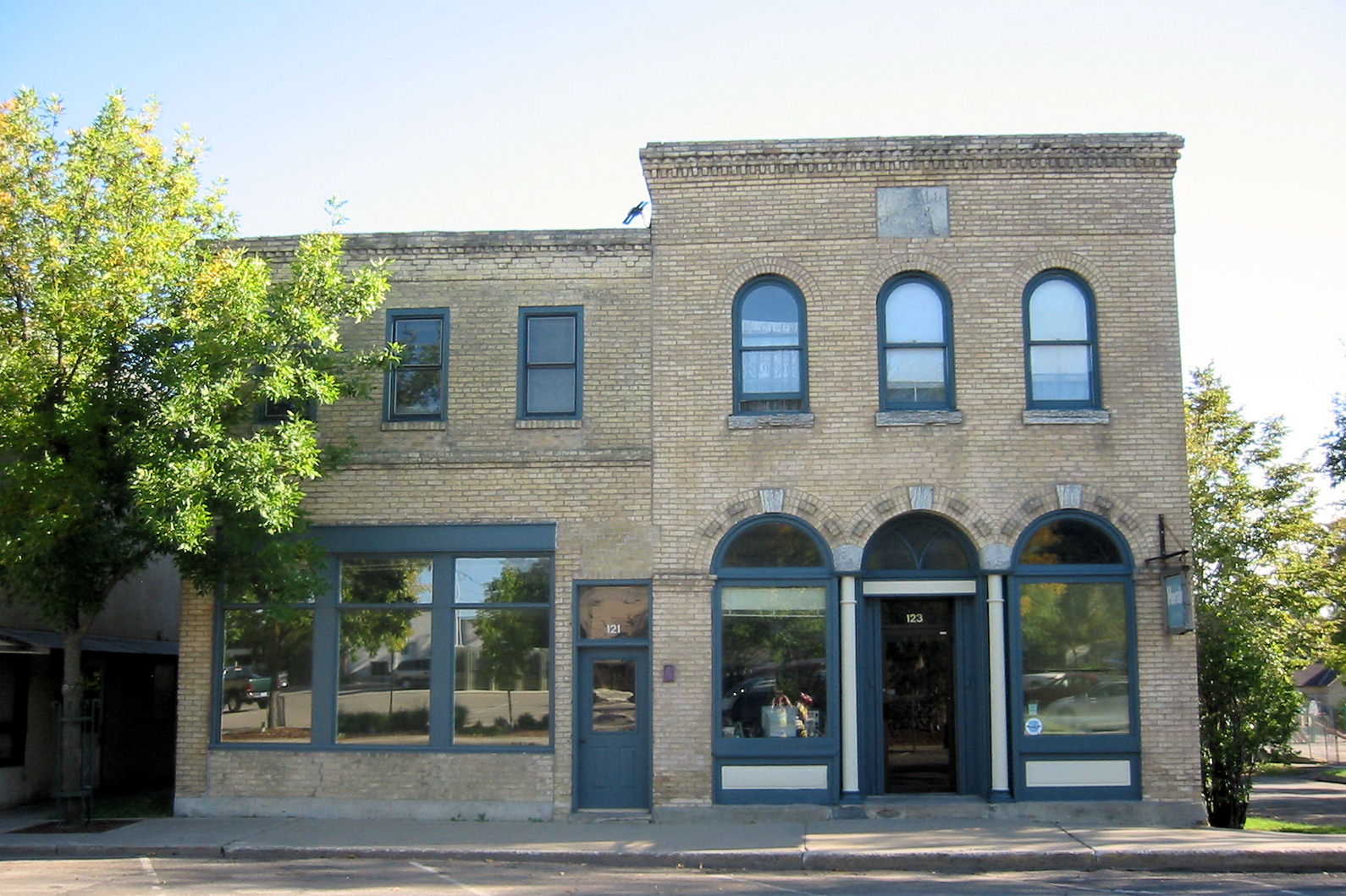

- Location within Minnesota
- Location: 123 W. 2nd St., Chaska, Minnesota
- Coordinates: 44°47′05″N 93°36′05″W
- Area: less than one acre
- Built: 1871
- MPS: Carver County MRA
- NRHP reference No.: 80001968
- Added to NRHP: January 4, 1980

The Herald Block is a building in Chaska, Minnesota listed on the National Register of Historic Places. The building was the place where the Chaska Herald newspaper was published from 1871 through 2024.

The paper was established by Charles Warner in 1862, and he sold it to Frederick E. DuToit in 1866. The DuToit family was one of Chaska's historically significant families. The Chaska Herald and several other local papers were purchased in 1982 by Red Wing Publishing, which owned more than 20 papers. In 2020, MediaNews Group purchased Red Wing Publishing. On April 24, 2024, MediaNews Group (a subsidiary of Alden Global Capital) announced it was shutting down the Chaska Herald and five other papers that had been published under the umbrella of Southwest News Media.

There are actually two sections to the building. The building on the corner of Pine and Second Streets has a triple-arched arcade with arches set on top of cast iron columns. The western section of the building was added in the 1880s and originally had a furniture store, but the newspaper enlarged and moved its offices and some equipment into the western section. The building is constructed of buff-colored Chaska brick.
