= Poughkeepsie Underwear Factory =

- U.S. National Register of Historic Places
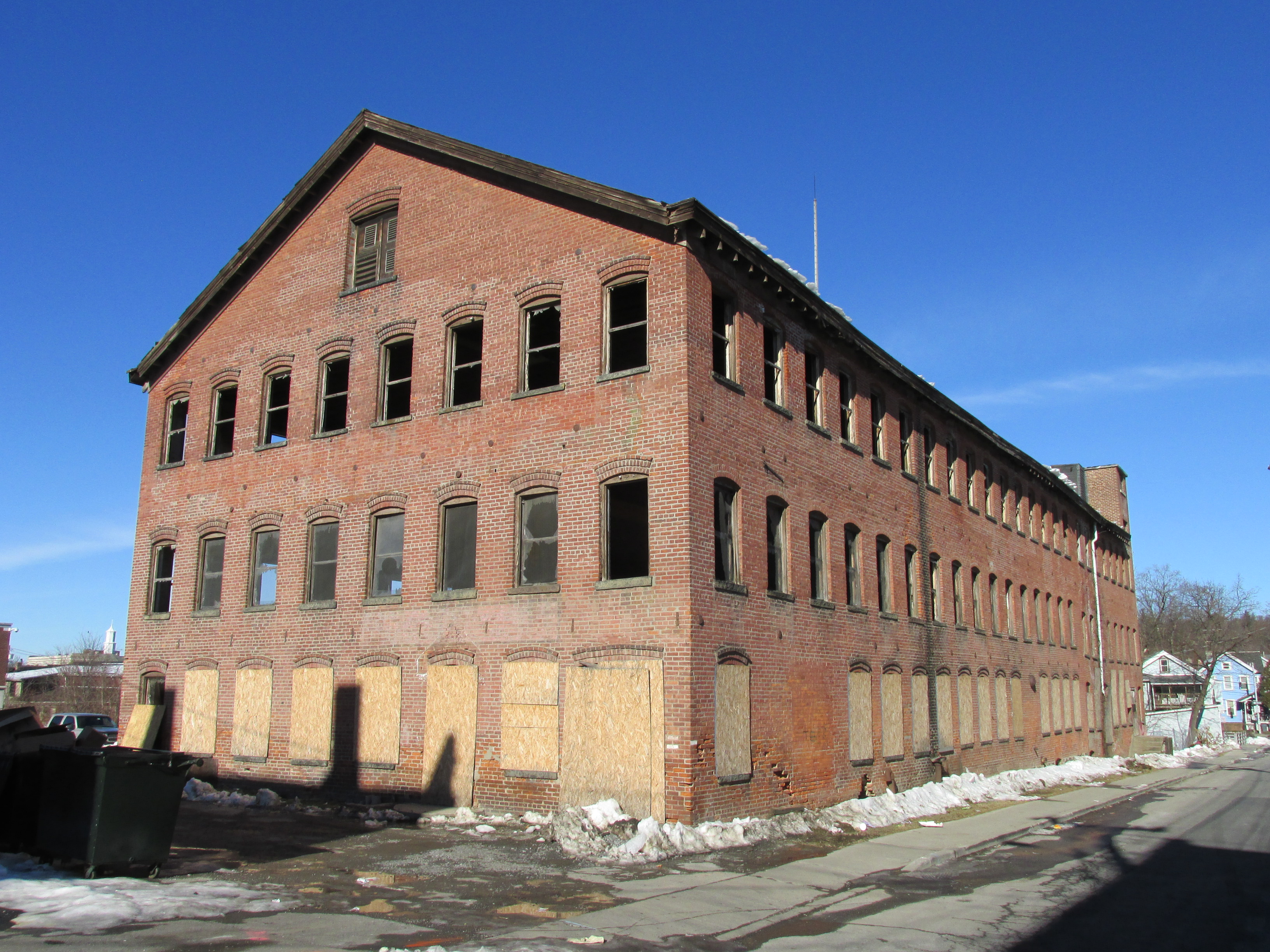
- Poughkeepsie Underwear Factory, in January 2013 prior to redevelopment

- Location within New York Location within the United States
- Location: 6-1 N. Cherry St., Poughkeepsie, New York
- Coordinates: 41°42′6″N 73°55′6″W
- Area: less than one acre
- Built: 1874
- MPS: Poughkeepsie MRA
- NRHP reference No.: 82001160
- Added to NRHP: November 26, 1982

Poughkeepsie Underwear Factory is a historic factory building located at Poughkeepsie, Dutchess County, New York. It was built in 1874 and is a 3 1/2-story, eight-bay brick building. It was expanded about 1887.

It was added to the National Register of Historic Places in 1982.

== History ==
The Poughkeepsie Underwear Factory property was built in 1874 as William S. Patten's Poughkeepsie Live Oak Leather Manufactury, and shortly thereafter became the Dutchess Manufacturing Company, which added on substantially to the original structure.

By 1895 the property was owned by William Paulding's Cooperage. The Queen Undermuslin Company, incorporated In 1899, moved from a location on Mill Street into this building in 1904. This location then became known as the Poughkeepsie Underwear Factory.

The building was remodeled to accommodate the Queen Undermuslins operations, and was entirely run on electricity.

The garments produced at the factory were shipped around the world.

The company produced 60,000 garments annually, exclusively for women and children, and able to be procured "at any dry goods or furnishing house of any importance."

The owners of the factory, Robert Stuart and JC MacLean, were inventors and local businessmen.

Their all-female workforce were involved in resolving business disputes. The factory grounds included a privet hedge, a flower bed at the front of the site, and a tennis court for recreation for the employees.

Not much is known about the history of the building from the mid-twentieth century onward. Later pictures show it as Central Press; no details exist about that operation that we are aware of. The building was vacant by the 1980s.

== Redevelopment ==
The redevelopment of the Poughkeepsie Underwear Factory is the anchor project in Hudson River Housing's work to revitalize the Middle Main Street corridor. This Hudson Valley nonprofit renovated this three story, 22,000 square foot building as mixed-use, with two thirds consisting of apartments, and one third as a commercial community hub.

- First Floor/Lower Level

- Poughkeepsie Open Kitchen (POK): a shared-use commercial kitchen with dry and cold storage available for kitchen members at the lower level.
- A cafe space available for rent to community members for events and by Open Kitchen members for pop-up events
- Little Loaf Bakeshop who operates the retail space in the cafe Thursday - Saturday, 8am -1pm.

- Second Floor

- PUF (Poughkeepsie Underwear Factory) Studios: Flexible artist studio spaces available for artists and artisans on a monthly basis and printmaking open studios and art classes for the public.

- Third Floor

- The Art Affect: Sparks Media Project and Mill Street Loft, two of the Hudson Valley's leading arts organizations have merged and now utilize space in the factory for youth arts programming.
- Fifteen Loft Apartments: A variety of studios and one bedroom apartments for individuals and families to work and live. Every unit, on all three floors, is ADA accessible.

== See also ==
- Northwestern Knitting Company Factory building: underwear factory on the NRHP
- Richmond Underwear Company Building: underwear factory on the NRHP
