= Carver County Sheriff's Office =

Law enforcement agency

- Shoulder patch
- Abbreviation: CCSO
- Motto: "To serve everyone with respect and dignity and to do so with honor, integrity and pride".

Agency overview
- Formed: March 5, 1855
- Employees: 200+ (with volunteers)

Jurisdictional structure
- Operations jurisdiction: Carver County, Minnesota, Minnesota, USA
- Map of Carver County Sheriff's Office's jurisdiction
- Area: 376 square miles (970 km^{2})
- Population: 106,922 (2020)
- General nature: Local civilian police

Operational structure
- Headquarters: Chaska, Minnesota

Website
- Carver County Sheriff's Office

The Carver County Sheriff's Office (CCSO) is the sheriff's office for Carver County in the U.S. state of Minnesota. The CCSO's main offices are at the Carver County Government Center in the county seat of Chaska, Minnesota.

== History ==
The Carver County Sheriff's Office was founded on March 5, 1855 in Minnesota Territory following the establishment of the newly created Carver County on February 20, 1855. The county's temporary seat was originally located in San Francisco Township and operated court cases out of Hennepin County. The first person to hold the office of Sheriff of Carver County was Levi Griffin (1822-1902) who was appointed by Territorial Governor Willis A. Gorman. Following Griffin's appointment all sheriffs thereafter were elected. To date a total of 19 citizens of the county have served as sheriff, the most recent being Jason Kamerud who was elected in 2018 with 51% of the majority vote. Kamerud was previously the office's Chief deputy.

In the history of the CCSO, a total of only three deputies of the CCSO have been killed in the line of duty, two were simultaneously hit by a train at the Zemble Street crossing in Chaska and one suffered a heart attack attempting to stop a speeding vehicle between Hamburg and Gotha.

== Notable incidents ==
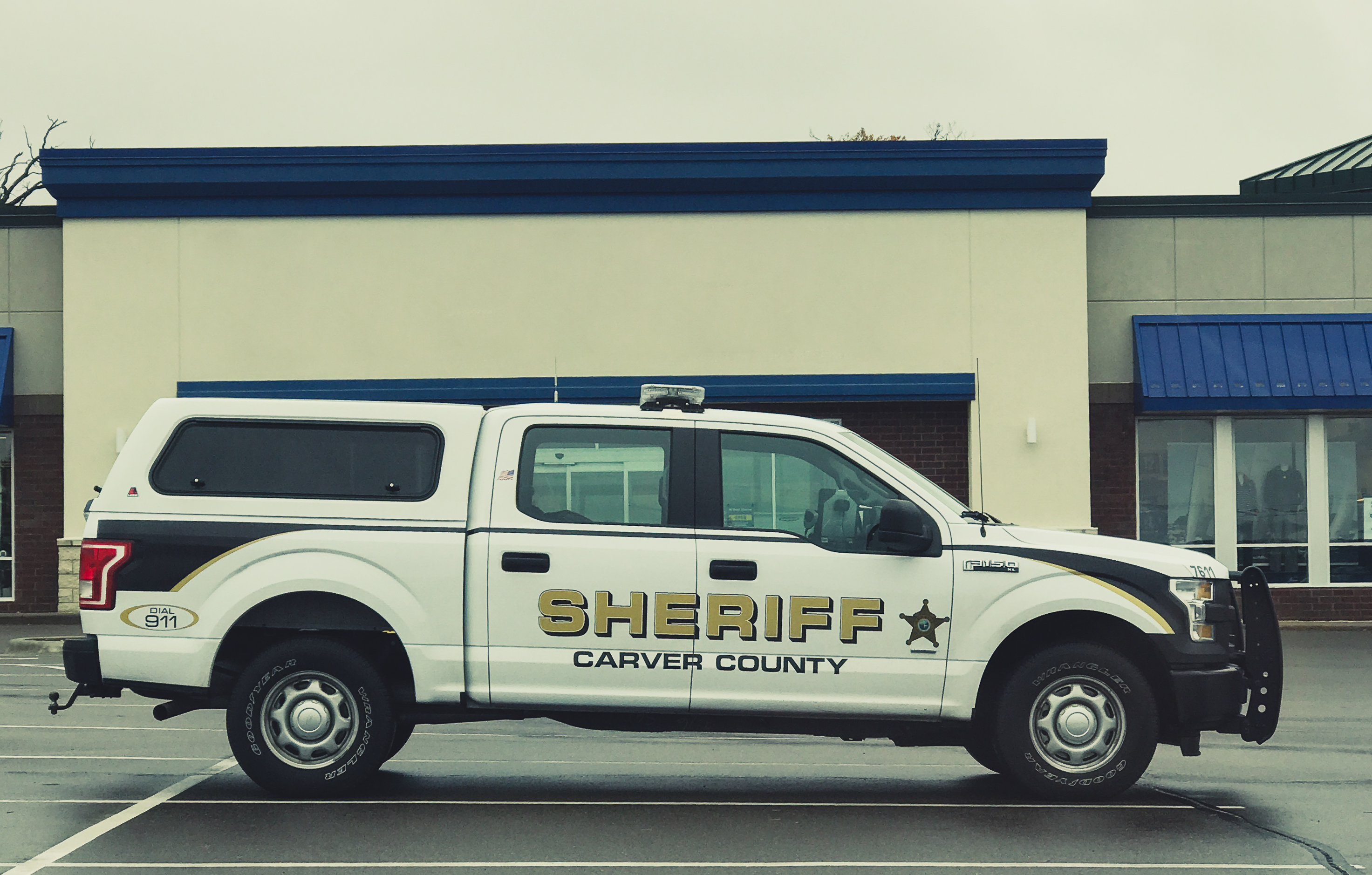
A CCSO Ford F-150

CCSO deputies were the first to respond to the fentanyl drug overdose of Prince at his private residence at Paisley Park in Chanhassen, Minnesota on April 21, 2016.

On August 7, 2021 a single engine Mooney M20M plane crashed into a yard and struck one house in Victoria, Minnesota, the CCSO was one of the initial responders to the incident.

On May 4, 2024 two CCSO deputies were involved in a use-of-force incident which resulted in the shooting of a knife-wielding man when responding to a report of a domestic violence dispute. Following the shooting both deputies were placed on critical incident leave.

CCSO deputies assisted the Sibley County Sheriff's Office, Minnesota State Patrol, and the Federal Bureau of Investigation in the manhunt for Vance Luther Boelter in Green Isle, Minnesota following the 2025 shootings of Minnesota legislators. Boelter fled to Green Isle following the assassination of Melissa Hortman and the attempted assassination of John Hoffman and his wife in Champlin, Minnesota. The manhunt is noted as the largest in state history.

In January 2026 the CCSO announced that it would not participate in an agreement with the United States Immigration and Customs Enforcement (ICE) to house immigrant detainees at the Carver County Jail due to the building's limited occupancy.

== Sheriffs of Carver County ==
- 1855-1856 Levi Griffin - appointed

Elected:

- 1856-1862 Ezekiel Ellsworth
- 1862-1864 Frederick Greiner
- 1864-1865 Frederick Hecklin
- 1865-1868 Ezekiel Ellsworth
- 1868-1872 Frederick Hecklin
- 1872-1874 Frederick Greiner
- 1874-1895 Frederick E. DuToit
- 1895-1902 August Johnson
- 1903-1922 Gustave "Gus" Gatz
- 1922-1938 Frank Trende
- 1938-1946 George Thul
- 1947-1973 Lester Melchert
- 1974-1983 William Schalow
- 1983-1986 Jack Hendrickson
- 1987-1998 Allen Wallin
- 1999-2011 Byron "Bud" Olson
- 2011-2018 Jim Olson
- 2019-2026 Jason Kamerud
