= Richmond Underwear Company Building =

- U.S. National Register of Historic Places
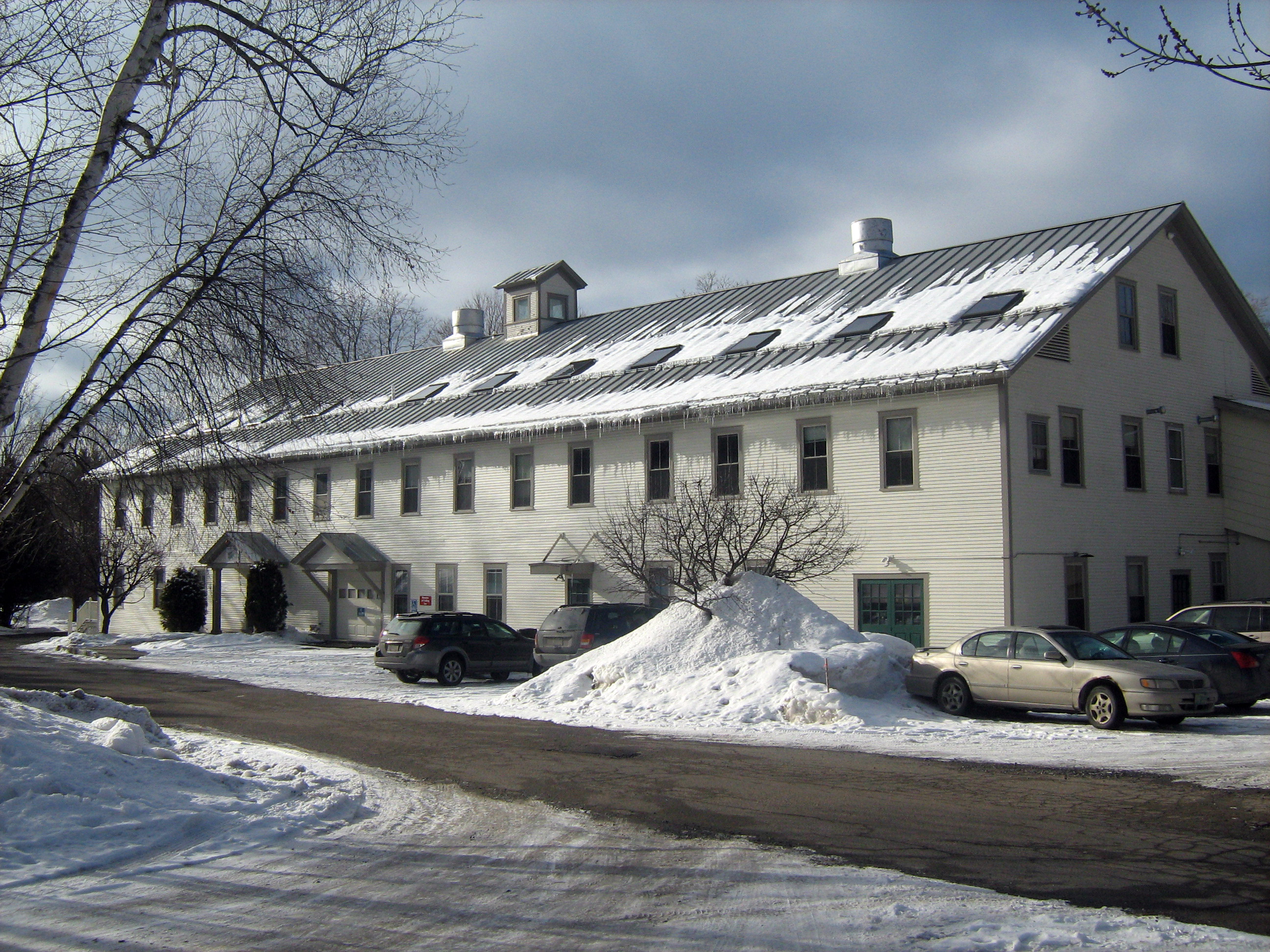

- Location within Vermont Location within the United States
- Location: 65 Millet St., Richmond, Vermont
- Coordinates: 44°24′25″N 72°59′38″W
- Area: 1.6 acres (0.65 ha)
- Built: 1900
- NRHP reference No.: 92000465
- Added to NRHP: May 7, 1992

The Richmond Underwear Company Building is a historic industrial facility at 65 Millet Road in Richmond, Vermont. Built in 1900, it was the town's first major industrial facility, bringing an economic boom to the town. The factory was used for the manufacture of underwear until 1946, and has seen a variety of industrial and commercial uses since then. It was listed on the National Register of Historic Places in 1992.

== Description and history ==
The Richmond Underwear Company Building stands in the village of Richmond, on the west side of Millet Street, an otherwise residential street off West Main Street (United States Route 2). It is a two-story wood-frame structure, sixteen bays long and seven deep, with a gabled roof topped by a central square gable-roofed cupola. The long street-facing facade has regularly spaced windows on the second level, and a series of irregularly arranged pedestrian entrances, windows, and equipment bays on the first floor.

The Richmond Underwear Company was formed in 1900, in response to a drive by the people of Richmond to attract a business to the town by means of financial inducement. The factory was built in a former apple orchard in seven months of 1900, and became one of Vermont's largest manufacturers of underwear, employing 300 people. This resulted in an influx of workers, and a building boom in the town that rapidly reshaped its character. It was the first building in the town to be fitted with steam heat and electrical power. In 1946 the building was sold to the Cellucord Corporation, a maker of rope from paper products. The building has seen a variety of uses since, and has also had significant periods of vacancy and decay. It presently houses offices.

== See also ==
- National Register of Historic Places listings in Chittenden County, Vermont
- Northwestern Knitting Company Factory building: underwear factory on the NRHP
- Poughkeepsie Underwear Factory: underwear factory on the NRHP
