= Chaska brick =

Brick produced in Chaska, Minnesota, USA

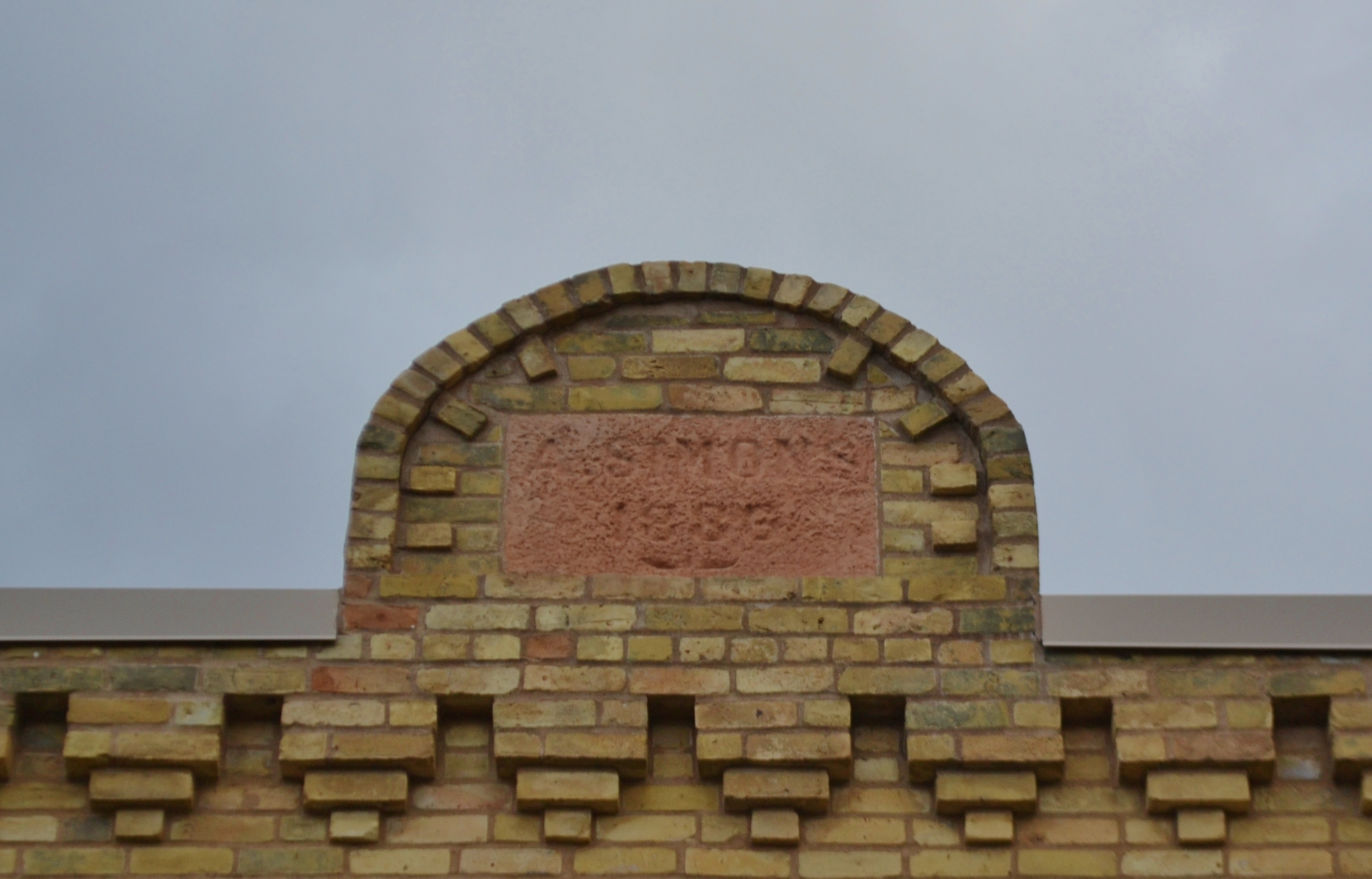
Detail view of Chaska brick in the Simons Building and Livery Barn in downtown Chaska

Chaska brick is a distinctive brick known for its unique cream color, high clay content, and quality, originating in Chaska, Minnesota, United States. The Chaska brick industry flourished from 1857 until 1950. First called "Chaska brick" in an 1894 Chaska Herald article, this product remains closely tied to the history of the city from which it came.

== Background ==
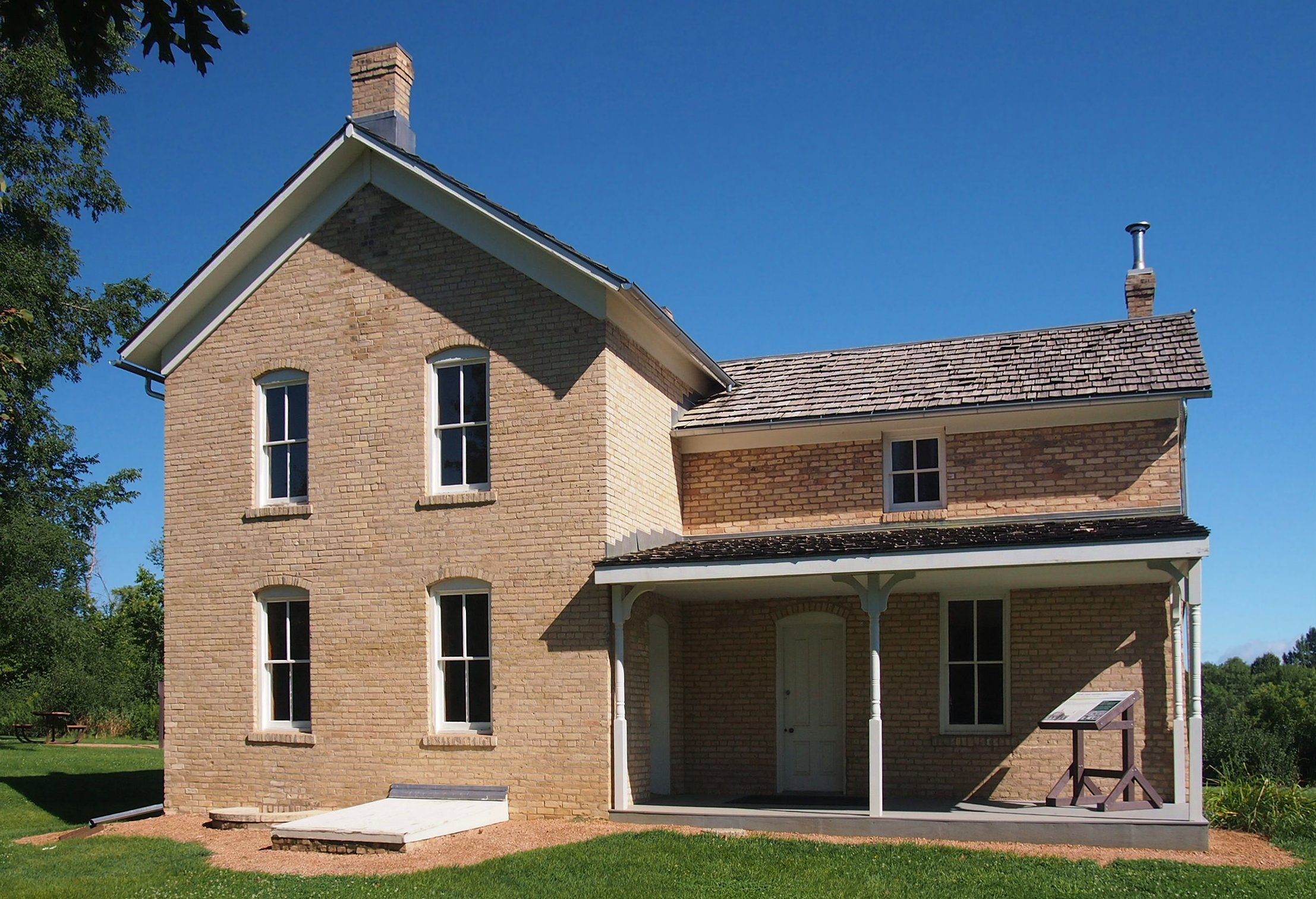
The Wendelin Grimm Farmhouse, an example of Chaska brick construction in Carver County

Three key factors led to the success and popularity of Chaska brick. First, the brick is made from clay found in deep, rich, alluvial clay deposits, with a distinctive layer of yellow clay over blue. Both clays are rich in sand and finely ground silica, giving the bricks a slight sparkle. Early use of wood to fire the brick versus later gas oven firing also caused sparkling. Early brick makers in the 19th century thought the deposit to be limitless, but it turned out to be about 20 to 45 feet (6.1 to 13.7 m) deep.

The existence of nearby rich wood sources to heat the brick-making kilns was another reason for the Chaska brick industry's success. Chaska and Carver County are located in what was once the Big Woods of western Wisconsin and south-central Minnesota. This large forest of oak, maple, basswood, elm, ash and white birch provided tons of wood to heat the kilns. Many farmers clearing land traded firewood for brick, and off-season brick workers cut firewood for their employers.

Third, Chaska was settled by German and Scandinavian immigrants, who came from areas where brick was the favored building material. These immigrants were skilled bricklayers, and provided experienced labor for the brickyards. Chaska brick also weighed less than other brick, making it cheaper to transport. Brick making and firing techniques improved over time as well.

== History ==
By the 1860s, four main brickyards existed in Chaska, employing about 100 people overall, in a town of only 1,255 people. By the 1880s, the number of employees had risen to nearly 400. By 1900, daily production reached a prodigious three and a half million bricks. Six brickyards employed around 600 men, 20% of the city population, making Chaska brick the leading source of jobs and money for the town. By the beginning of the 20th century, 30% of all brick used in Minnesota was made in Chaska.

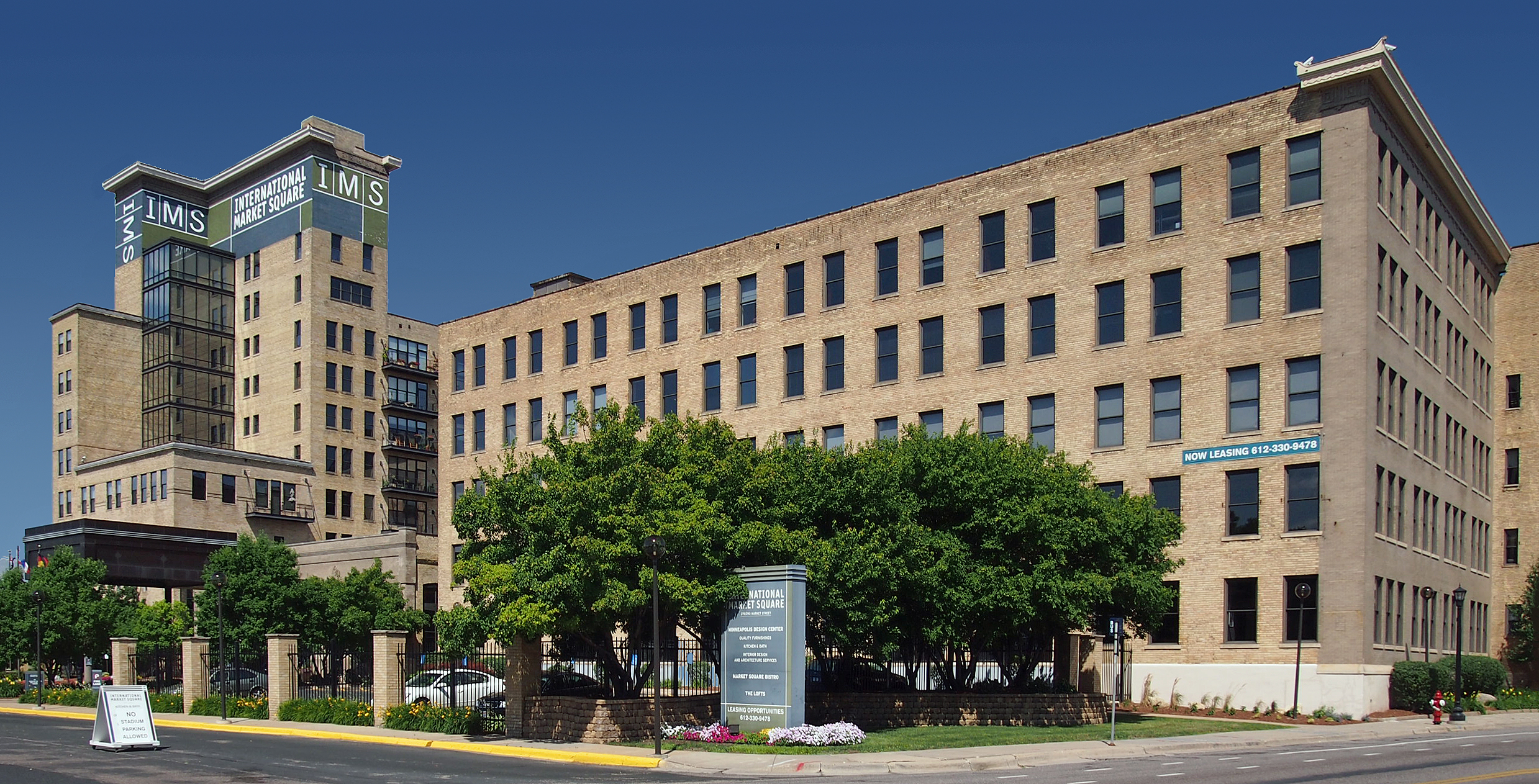
International Market Square, formerly the Northwestern Knitting Company Factory, is constructed from Chaska brick

Many important buildings in Minnesota are constructed of Chaska brick. For example, in Minneapolis, it can be seen in the Orpheum Theatre, Renaissance Square, International Market Square, Wesbrook Hall on the University of Minnesota Minneapolis Campus, the Minneapolis Grain Exchange, and the Minneapolis Auditorium. In Saint Paul, the Minnesota State Capitol—where over two million bricks built the basement—and the prison at Fort Snelling are made with Chaska brick. It was used to line the sewers of Minneapolis and Saint Paul. Chaska brick was used in many types of buildings, such as schools, city buildings, factories, mills, hotels, barns, houses, outhouses, stables, saloons, restaurants, banks, and churches.

Over the first half of the 20th century, the Chaska brick industry stalled. New building materials like structural clay tiles and concrete blocks were preferred. The new types of materials, and the financial crisis of the Great Depression, led to the industry's decline. There was not enough demand for the supply. In the late 1960s, building fashion changed, and olive green or harvest gold bricks were preferred. Over time, brickyard owner Charles Klein bought out the other brickyards, or they shut down from lack of sales. Trouble between labor and management in the 1960s lowered Chaska brick's market price, interrupting the supply produced. Klein's brickyard, the last to produce Chaska brick, finally shut its doors in 1971.

== Legacy ==
After production of Chaska brick ended, its historic significance was recognized. Many buildings made of Chaska brick were placed on the National Register of Historic Places. Examples of these buildings in Carver County include the Frederick E. DuToit House, the Wendelin Grimm Farmstead, the Herald Block, the Simons Building and Livery Barn, and the Paul Mohrbacher House. In the 21st century, efforts to protect Chaska brick buildings continue through historic preservation.
