= List of county roads in Sibley County, Minnesota =

Highway names
- County State-Aid Highways: County State-Aid Highway X (CSAH X)
- County Roads: County Road X (CR X)

System links
- County roads of Minnesota; Sibley County

The following is a list of county-maintained roads in Sibley County, Minnesota, United States. Some of the routes included in this list are also county-state-aid-highways (CSAH).

== Route list ==
Number	Length (mi)	Length (km)	Southern or western terminus	Northern or eastern terminus	Local names	Formed	Removed	Notes
CSAH 1	—	—	MN 19 in Winthrop	County 4 in Alfsborg Township		—	—	
CSAH 2	—	—	Nicollet County line	Renville County line (County 20)		—	—	
CSAH 3	—	—	Nicollet County line	McLeod County line		—	—	
CSAH 4	—	—	Nicollet County line	McLeod County line		—	—	
CSAH 5	—	—	Scott County line (County 1)	County 61 in Washington Lake Township		—	—	
CSAH 6	—	—	MN 19 in Henderson	MN 25 in Faxon Township		—	—	
CSAH 7	—	—	County 10 in Grafton Township	County 2 in Grafton Township		—	—	
CSAH 8	—	—	County 22 in Severance Township	US 169 and MN 93 in Henderson Township		—	—	
CSAH 9	—	—	Nicollet County line	McLeod County line		—	—	
CSAH 10	—	—	200th Street in Grafton Township	MN 22 in Gaylord		—	—	
CSAH 11	—	—	County 12 in Arlington Township	McLeod and Carver County lines		—	—	
CSAH 12	—	—	MN 22 in Dryden Township	County 9 in Arlington Township		—	—	Western Segment
CSAH 12	—	—	MN 5 in Arlington	County 6 in Jessenland Township		—	—	Eastern Segment
CSAH 13	—	—	County 8 in Sibley Township	McLeod County line		—	—	
CSAH 14	—	—	MN 25 in Faxon Township	Carver County line		—	—	
CSAH 15	—	—	McLeod County line	MN 5 in Green Isle Township		—	—	
CSAH 16	—	—	County 27 in Jessenland Township	Carver County line		—	—	
CSAH 17	—	—	County 8 in Kelso Township	MN 5 in Arlington		—	—	
CSAH 18	—	—	County 17 in Kelso Township	County 8 in Henderson Township		—	—	
CSAH 20	—	—	Nicollet County line	County 8 in Henderson Township		—	—	
CSAH 21	—	—	MN 22 in Gaylord	County 12 in Dryden Township		—	—	
CSAH 22	—	—	Nicollet County line	Renville County line		—	—	
CSAH 23	—	—	County 8 in Alfsborg Township	MN 19 in Transit Township		—	—	
CSAH 24	—	—	Nicollet County line	County 8 in Cornish Township		—	—	
CSAH 25	—	—	County 22 in Severance Township	MN 15 in Cornish Township		—	—	
CSAH 26	—	—	County 10 in Transit Township	MN 22 in Dryden Township		—	—	
CSAH 27	—	—	County 12 in Jessenland Township	County 5 in Faxon Township		—	—	
CSAH 28	—	—	County 11 in Green Isle	MN 25 in Green Isle		—	—	
CSAH 29	—	—	County 15 in New Auburn	MN 22 in New Auburn		—	—	
CSAH 32	—	—	County 33 in Winthrop	MN 19 in Winthrop		—	—	
CSAH 33	—	—	MN 15 in Winthrop	MN 19 in Winthrop		—	—	
CSAH 34	—	—	County 9 in Arlington	County 17 in Arlington		—	—	
CR 52	—	—	671st Avenue in Grafton Township	County 2 in Grafton Township		—	—	
CR 53	—	—	County 8 in Cornish Township	MN 15 in Bismarck Township		—	—	
CR 56	—	—	520th Street in Severance Township	County 22 in Severance Township		—	—	
CR 57	—	—	County 8 in Alfsborg Township	County 1 in Alfsborg Township		—	—	Southern Segment
CR 57	—	—	MN 19 in Winthrop	County 58 in Transit Township		—	—	Northern Segment
CR 58	—	—	MN 15 in Transit Township	MN 22 in Dryden Township		—	—	
CR 59	—	—	County 13 in New Auburn Township	County 11 in Green Isle Township		—	—	
CSAH 60	—	—	County 6 in Faxon Township	MN 25 in Faxon Township		—	—	
CR 61	—	—	MN 5 and MN 25 in Green Isle	County 5 in Washington Lake Township		—	—	
CR 62	—	—	MN 22 in Sibley Township	MN 19 in Henderson Township		—	—	
CR 63	—	—	Nicollet County line	County 8 in Sibley Township		—	—	
CR 64	—	—	County 12 in Jessenland Township	County 119 in Jessenland Township		—	—	
CR 65	—	—	MN 19 in Arlington Township	MN 19 in Jessenland Township		—	—	
CR 67	—	—	481st Avenue in Sibley Township	280th Street in Dryden Township		—	—	
CR 107	—	—	County 2 in Grafton Township	McLeod County line		—	—	
CR 108	—	—	520th Street in Severance Township	County 22 in Severance Township		—	—	
CR 117	—	—	MN 5 in Arlington	Highland Lane in Arlington Township		—	—	
CR 119	—	—	County 27 in Jessenland Township	County 6 in Jessenland Township		—	—	
CR 154	—	—	Renville County line	County 2 in Moltke Township		—	—	
CR 155	—	—	County 8 in Severance Township	County 2 in Severance Township		—	—	
CR 160	—	—	MN 25 in Faxon Township	Carver County line		—	—	
CR 164	—	—	County 11 in Washington Lake Township	County 27 in Jessenland Township		—	—	
CR 166	—	—	County 17 in Arlington	387th Avenue in Arlington Township		—	—	
