= Lake Washington (disambiguation) =

Lake Washington is a lake bordering Seattle.

Lake Washington or Washington Lake may also refer to:

== Lakes in the United States ==
- Washington Lake (California), Sacramento, California
- Lake Washington (Florida), a lake at Melbourne, Florida
- Washington Lake (Idaho), a lake in the White Cloud Mountains
- Lake Washington (Le Sueur and Blue Earth counties, Minnesota)
- Lake Washington (Meeker County, Minnesota)
- Washington Lake (Sibley County, Minnesota)
- Lake Washington (Mississippi), a lake in Washington County
- Lake Washington (New York), main reservoir for the city of Newburgh, New York
- Lake Washington (Providence County, Rhode Island), lake in Glocester, Rhode Island

== Other places ==
- Washington Lake, a freshwater lake of Teraina (also known as Washington Island), Kiribati
- Washington Lake Township, Sibley County, Minnesota, a township

== See also ==
- Lake Washington Boulevard, a scenic route in Seattle that hugs Lake Washington
- Lake Washington Technical College
- Lake Washington Floating Bridge (disambiguation)
