= New Rome, Minnesota =

New Rome
- Unincorporated community
- Location within Minnesota Location within the United States
- Coordinates: 44°32′36″N 94°05′33″W
- Country: United States
- State: Minnesota
- County: Sibley
- Township: Arlington Township and Kelso Township
- Elevation: 994 ft (303 m)
- Time zone: UTC-6 (Central (CST))
  - Summer (DST): UTC-5 (CDT)
- ZIP code: 55307
- Area code: 507
- GNIS feature ID: 648519

New Rome is an unincorporated community in Sibley County, Minnesota, United States, near Arlington. The community is located along Sibley County Road 9 (411th Avenue) near 280th Street. New Rome is located within Arlington Township and Kelso Township. State Highway 19 (MN 19) is nearby.
