= August B. Mueller =

American politician (1905–1996)

August B. Muller (June 8, 1905 – August 18, 1996) was an American farmer and politician.

Mueller was born on a farm in Arlington Township, Sibley County, Minnesota and went to Arlington High School. Mueller also went to St. Olaf College in Northfield, Minnesota. He lived in Arlington, Minnesota and was a farmer who raised beef cattle. Mueller served on the Sibley County Fair Board and also served as the Arlington Township clerk. He served in the Minnesota House of Representatives from 1941 to 1974 and was a Republican. Mueller died at the Community Hospital in Arlington, Minnesota.
