= Anna A. Maley =

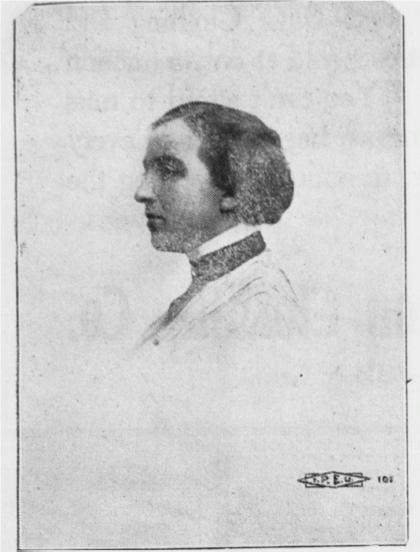
- Anna Agnes Maley, circa 1911
- Born: Anna Agnes Maley; January 6, 1872; Faxon, Minnesota, U.S.
- Died: November 28, 1918 (aged 46); Minneapolis, Minnesota, U.S.
- Resting place: St. Mary's cemetery, Minneapolis, Minnesota
- Known for: Political activist and journalist

Anna Agnes Maley (January 6, 1872 – November 28, 1918) was an American school teacher, journalist, newspaper editor, and political activist. One of a small number of top female leaders of the Socialist Party of America during the years prior to World War I, Maley is best remembered as the first woman to run for governor of Washington state in 1912.

== Biography ==
=== Early years ===
Anna A. Maley was born January 6, 1872, in Faxon, Sibley County, Minnesota, the daughter of Irish immigrants. After completing her secondary education, Maley worked first as a stenographer before taking a position as a schoolteacher. She taught for six years in the public schools of Minnesota before entering the University of Minnesota, where she studied literature.

During her time at the University of Minnesota, Maley was introduced to socialist ideas and became a committed adherent. She joined the Socialist Labor Party of America and was the recording secretary of Section Minneapolis of that organization in 1899 when it cast its support with a dissident faction that attempted to depose powerful party leader Daniel DeLeon and his associates from the National Executive Committee.

Maley was elected the first Secretary of Local Minneapolis of the Socialist Party of America at the time of its formation late in the summer of 1901.

=== Political career ===
In 1903, Maley was made part of the staff of Julius Wayland's seminal Socialist weekly, the Appeal to Reason, based in the small Southeastern Kansas town of Girard. After a few years at the Appeal, Maley moved to New York City to continue her career in Socialist journalism, taking a position on the staff of The Worker, weekly forerunner of the daily New York Call. Maley continued on at the Call at the time of its launch in 1908.

At the urging of the highly esteemed Social Democratic Party of Germany, the Second International passed a resolution in August 1907 calling upon the Socialist parties of the world to launch their own women's sections to agitate for the right to vote and to better target socialist propaganda to a female audience. The governing National Executive Committee of the Socialist Party of America was quick to follow this international guidance, approving a national lecturer for the organization of independent women in January 1908 and moving the question of women's relationship to the socialist movement onto the agenda for the May 1908 National Convention of the party, held in Chicago.

Cover of the December 1, 1911, Everett, Washington, socialist weekly edited by Maley, The Commonwealth. A front-page editorial expounds on the plight of systematically underpaid working women.

Further motivated by a May 12, 1908, gathering of the non-party Socialist Women's League of Chicago — held simultaneously with the party conclave — the 1908 SPA National Convention formally approved the previous appointment of a national lecturer for women and recommended the establishment of a five-member Woman's National Committee to coordinate the party's female-oriented activities. Although not one of the five original members of the National Woman's Committee, Maley was named to the committee in 1909, when she succeeded Akron attorney Marguerite Prevey as chairwoman.

Maley was regarded by her peers as a talented and effective public speaker and she spent extensive time in Los Angeles in 1911 speaking on behalf of the mayoral campaign of Job Harriman in that year.

In September 1911, Maley made her way to the Pacific Northwestern region of the United States to take over as editor of the Socialist newspaper The Commonwealth, based in the mill town of Everett, Washington. During the time she headed the financially struggling paper, Maley earned her primary income as a public lecturer, drawing very little income from the paper's coffers. Maley remained on the staff until the end of May 1912, when she left wage a campaign running for Governor of Washington.

Maley's candidacy marked the first time that a woman had run for the highest office in Washington state. Although she won more than 12% of the vote in the 1912 Washington gubernatorial race, finishing fourth, Maley's vote totals ran slightly behind those generated by Presidential candidate Eugene V. Debs. Despite this, the number of ballots cast for Maley exceeded those cast for any other Socialist Party nominee for governor, before or since.

Maley was a supporter of the moderate faction of the Socialist Party of Washington headed by Seattle dentist Edwin J. Brown and Walter Thomas Mills and was essentially squeezed out of the state party during the bitter factional war of 1913. She ended her tenure as editor of The Commonwealth in February of that year. Leaving the West, Maley was active in a free speech fight in the Eastern mining state of West Virginia in the summer of 1913.

A return to New York City followed, with Maley taking a job as an instructor at the Socialist Party's Rand School of Social Science. Maley wrote a short works during this period, a textbook for students of socialism at the Rand School called Elements of Socialism: Twelve Lessons.

Maley was elected to the governing National Executive Committee of the Socialist Party in 1916, becoming just the third woman to serve in that capacity from the time of the party's formation in 1901 until the coming of World War I.

=== Later years, death, and legacy ===
At the age of 41, Maley married Warren M. Ringsdorf, on December 22, 1914, in Chicago, Illinois. A few months after they wed, Ringsdorf fell ill from tuberculosis. Maley nursed Ringsdorf through his protracted illness, which ultimately killed him.

Returning to Socialist Party work after her husband's death, Maley hit the road as a touring lecturer on behalf of the organization. This continued until she contracted malaria while in Arkansas, a condition complicated by the onset of Bright's disease. Maley remained in ill health for the rest of her life, returning to Minnesota to be cared for by her family.

Back home in Minneapolis, Maley returned to work again as an assistant to Thomas Van Lear, the Socialist mayor of the city. She remained in this position for the last two years of her life, eventually succumbing to her chronic illness.

Anna Maley died on November 28, 1918, in Minneapolis, at the age of 46. Her body was interred at St. Mary's Cemetery in Minneapolis.

== Works ==
- Elements of Socialism: Twelve Lessons. New York: Rand School of Social Science, 1914.
- Our National Kitchen: The Substance of a Speech on Socialism. Minneapolis, MN: People's Press, 1916.
- The Workers' Herald Campaign Leaflet. Minneapolis, MN: Hennepin County Central Committee for the Candidates of the Socialist Party, Committee on Information, 1918.
