= Rush River =

Rush River is the name of several communities in the United States:

- Rush River, Minnesota
- Rush River Township in North Dakota
- Rush River, Wisconsin

Rush River is the name of several rivers in the United States:

- Rush River (Minnesota)
- Rush River (North Dakota) in North Dakota
- Rush River (Virginia) in Virginia
- Rush River (Wisconsin)
