= Rush River, Minnesota =

Rush River
- Unincorporated community
- Location within Minnesota Location within the United States
- Coordinates: 44°28′02″N 94°03′03″W
- Country: United States
- State: Minnesota
- County: Sibley
- Township: Kelso Township
- Elevation: 948 ft (289 m)
- Time zone: UTC-6 (Central (CST))
  - Summer (DST): UTC-5 (CDT)
- ZIP code: 56058
- Area code: 507
- GNIS feature ID: 654919

Rush River is an unincorporated community in Kelso Township, Sibley County, Minnesota, United States, near Le Sueur.

The community is located along Sibley County Road 8 near Sibley County Road 17 (391st Avenue). The South Branch of the Rush River flows through the community.
