= Dryden Township =

Dryden Township may refer to one of the following townships in the United States:

- Dryden Township, Michigan
- Dryden Township, Minnesota
