= Arlington Township =

Arlington Township may refer to:

- Arlington Township, Michigan
- Arlington Township, Sibley County, Minnesota
