= Thomas O. Streissguth =

American judge

Justice Streissguth

Thomas O. Streissguth (February 27, 1889 – December 21, 1950) was an American lawyer and jurist.

Born in Arlington, Minnesota, Streissguth received his law degree from the University of Minnesota Law School in 1914. He practiced law in Redwood Falls, Minnesota in 1914 and 1915 and Gaylord, Minnesota from 1915 to 1923. In 1923, he moved to New Ulm, Minnesota where he lived for the rest of his life. Streissguth served as district attorney for Brown County, Minnesota from 1924 to 1942. Streissguth then served on the Minnesota Supreme Court briefly for three months in 1942 and again for one year in 1944. Streissguth died of a heart attack in New Ulm, Minnesota.
