= Cornish Township, Minnesota =

Cornish Township is the name of some places in the U.S. state of Minnesota:

- Cornish Township, Aitkin County, Minnesota
- Cornish Township, Sibley County, Minnesota
