= Assumption, Minnesota =

Unincorporated community in Minnesota, US

Assumption
- Unincorporated community
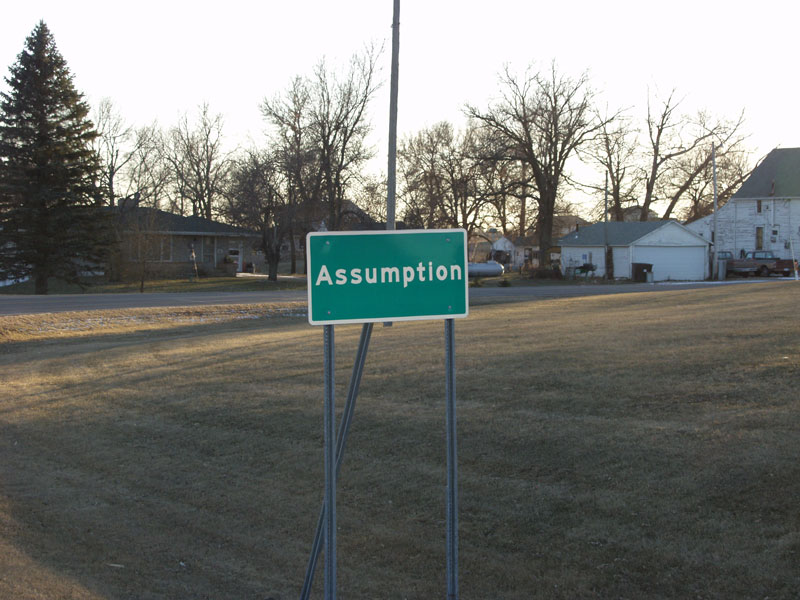
- Signpost for Assumption

- Location within Minnesota Location within the United States
- Coordinates: 44°41′17″N 93°53′20″W
- Country: United States
- State: Minnesota
- Counties: Carver and Sibley
- Township: Hancock Township and Washington Lake Township
- Elevation: 1,010 ft (310 m)
- Time zone: UTC-6 (Central (CST))
  - Summer (DST): UTC-5 (CDT)
- ZIP code: 55338 and 55368
- Area codes: 507 and 952
- GNIS feature ID: 639488

Assumption is an unincorporated community in Carver and Sibley Counties, Minnesota, United States.

The community is located eight miles east-northeast of Green Isle. Nearby places also include Hamburg, Norwood Young America, Bongards, Cologne, and Belle Plaine. The community is home to the Assumption State Wildlife Management Area.

Assumption is located within Hancock Township in Carver County; and also located within Washington Lake Township in Sibley County.

== History ==
A post office previously operated in Assumption from 1881 to 1906. Assumption took its name from a Roman Catholic church of the same name.
