= Sibley East High School =

Coordinates: 44.60833°N 94.08056°W

Location
- 202 3rd Ave NW; Arlington, Minnesota 55307; United States

Information
- Type: Public
- Established: 1951
- Principal: Jeremy Wagner
- Staff: 17.09 (FTE)
- Grades: 9-12
- Enrollment: 349 (2023–2024)
- Student to teacher ratio: 20.42
- Mascot: Wolverine
- Colors: Black and Gold
- Website: sibleyeast.org

Sibley East High School is a four-year public high school with students from three towns, Gaylord, Green Isle, and Arlington. It is between the Twin Cities and Mankato, Minnesota, about 10 miles off State Highway 169. It is associated with the Minnesota State High School League. Sibley East has about 1,200 students.

== History ==
Sibley East has been through multiple consolidations and cooperative programs. It first arose in 1986, as a cooperative program between the Arlington–Green Isle and Henderson school districts in eastern Sibley County. This program consolidated the Henderson Tigers and Arlington-Green Isle Indians into the joint Sibley East Bengals varsity team. This program ended in 1989, shortly before Henderson consolidated with Le Sueur as the Le Sueur-Henderson school district, but in 1991, Sibley East became the name of the high school and school district, as the Arlington-Green Isle school district merged with the Gaylord school district. With the full consolidation of Gaylord, the varsity team name was changed to the Sibley East Wolverines.

== Football ==
Sibley East won its first state football championship in 1972, and won again in 1974, 1976, and 1980. In 2012, the team played in the state playoffs for the first time since the 1980s.
