= Kirby Lake (Minnesota) =

Lake in the state of Minnesota, United States

- Location within Minnesota
- Location: Sibley County, Minnesota
- Coordinates: 44°37′35″N 94°11′19″W
- Type: lake

Kirby Lake is a lake in Sibley County, in the U.S. state of Minnesota.

Kirby Lake was named for James Patterson Kirby, an Irish settler.

== See also ==
- List of lakes in Minnesota
