= Le Sueur-Henderson Secondary School =

Location
- 901 E Ferry St; Le Sueur MN 56058; 44.4577°N 93.9023°W

Information
- Type: Public
- Established: 1885
- School district: Le Sueur-Henderson School District
- Superintendent: Darren Kern
- Principal: Cynthia Schmidt
- Grades: 6–12
- Colors: Royal Blue and Gold
- Athletics conference: South Central Conference
- Mascot: The Jolly Green Giant
- Website: isd2397.org

Le Sueur-Henderson Secondary School is a public school located in Le Sueur, Minnesota. The school serves both communities of Le Sueur and Henderson, Minnesota for grades 6–12. This adds up to a student body of 537 students, 234 enrolled in middle school (grades 6–8), and 303 in high school (grades 9–12).

== School system ==
The Le Sueur-Henderson School System consists of Park Elementary School and Le Sueur-Henderson Secondary School in Le Sueur and Hilltop Elementary School in Henderson. Each of these schools service their own division of the system from (Kindergarten-12th grade). Park Elementary School serves Kindergarten-5th grade; Hilltop currently serves as an Alternative Learning Center since 2023-24 school year after previously serving as a 4th–5th grade elementary school; Le Sueur-Henderson Secondary School serves 6th–12th grade. Opening for the 2024- 2025 school year will be a new elementary school called Le Sueur- Henderson Elementary School. The school will be located next to the high school but will not be connected.

== History ==
The establishment that is now Le Sueur-Henderson Secondary School was founded in 1885. However, before its merger, the current establishment was simply named Le Sueur Secondary School. Henderson High School had fully existed as an independent high school until 1986 when it had merged its athletics, Henderson Tigers, with nearby Arlington-Green Isle, Sibley East Bengals. This had marked the beginning of Henderson's loss of independence as in 1990 they had joined to form Le Sueur-Henderson School District and finally, in 1992, Henderson High School closed and consolidated with Le Sueur Secondary School forming the current Le Sueur-Henderson Secondary School.

== Athletics ==
State Champions:

Le Sueur: 1982 Girls Golf, 1983 Girls Golf, 1986 Boys Basketball, 1989 Boys Golf, 2021 Softball

Henderson: 1983 Girls Basketball

Conference Affiliation:

Minnesota River Conference 1959-2024

South Central Conference 2024–Present
