= 1912 Washington gubernatorial election =

- November 5, 1912
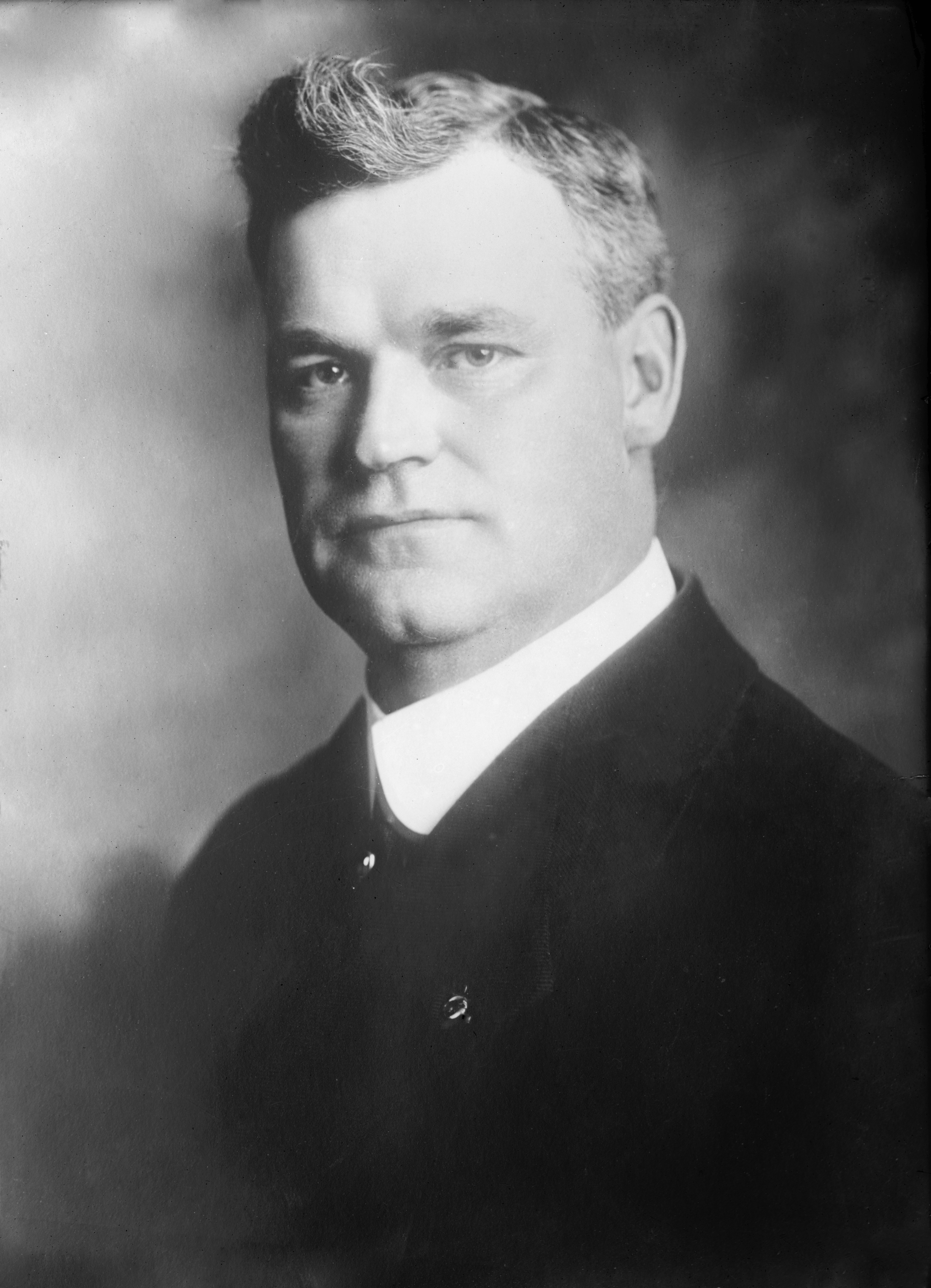

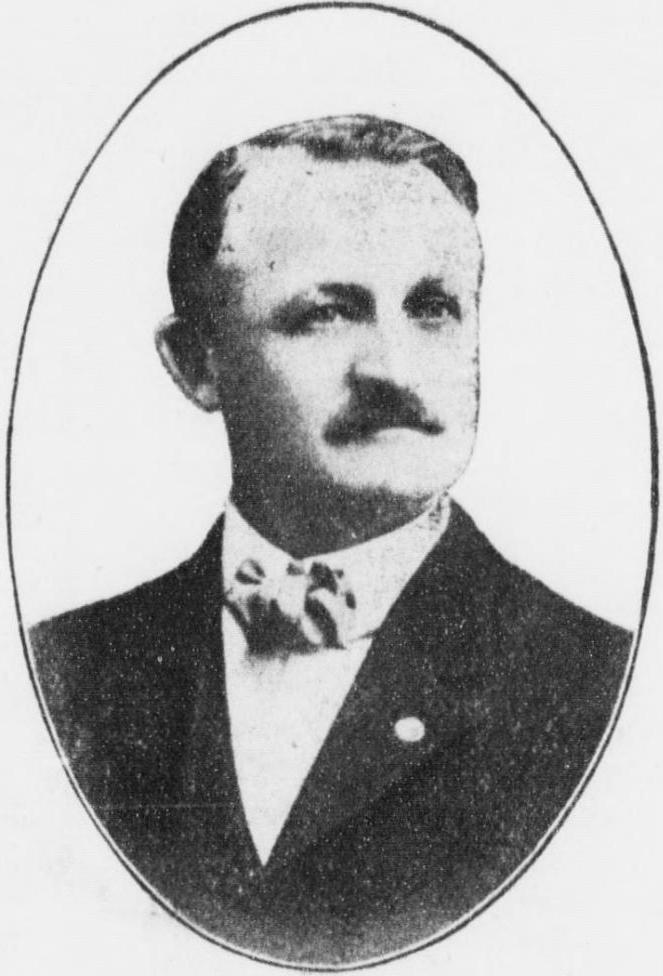

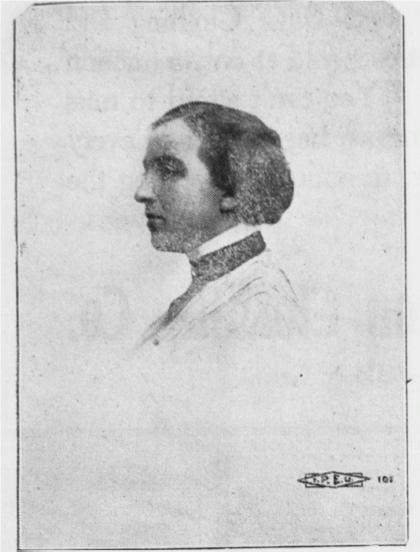
Nominee	Ernest Lister	Marion E. Hay
Party	Democratic	Republican
Popular vote	97,251	96,629
Percentage	30.55%	30.35%
Nominee	Robert T. Hodge	Anna A. Maley
Party	Progressive	Socialist
Popular vote	77,792	37,155
Percentage	24.44%	11.67%
- County results Lister: 30–40% 40–50% Hay: 20–30% 30–40% 40–50% Hodge: 30–40%
Governor before election
Marion E. Hay
Republican
Elected Governor
Ernest Lister
Democratic

The 1912 Washington gubernatorial election was held on November 5, 1912. Democratic nominee Ernest Lister defeated Republican incumbent Marion E. Hay with 30.55% of the vote. Lister was voted in with the smallest percentage of the vote in a gubernatorial election in the 1900s. This was the first election in Washington in which women had the right to vote.

== Primary election ==
Primary elections were held on September 10, 1912.

=== Republican party ===
==== Candidates ====
- Marion E. Hay, incumbent Governor
- Orville Billings

==== Results ====
Republican primary results
Party	Candidate	Votes	%
Republican	Marion E. Hay (incumbent)	69,005	76.93%
Republican	Orville Billings	20,689	23.07%
Total votes		89,694	100.00%

=== Democratic party ===
==== Candidates ====
- W. W. Black
- Ernest Lister, former member of the Tacoma City Council
- Hugh C. Todd
- E. C. Million
- M. M. Godman
- William Henry Dunphy
- L. F. Chester

==== Results ====
Democratic primary results, first choice
Party	Candidate	Votes	%
Democratic	W. W. Black	4,451	20.01%
Democratic	Ernest Lister	4,420	19.87%
Democratic	Hugh C. Todd	3,448	15.50%
Democratic	William Henry Dunphy	2,966	13.33%
Democratic	E. C. Million	2,788	12.53%
Democratic	M. M. Godman	2,649	11.91%
Democratic	L. F. Chester	1,521	6.84%
Total votes		22,243	100.00%

Since no candidate received more than 40% of the first choice votes, the second choice votes were counted. W. W. Black was disqualified for being a sitting judge, so the second-placed Ernest Lister was ultimately the Democratic nominee.

Democratic primary results, combined (Note: These are the stated combined totals; for all candidates the sum of first and second choice votes does not equal the stated combined total)
Party	Candidate	Votes	%
Democratic	W. W. Black	8,166	18.68%
Democratic	Ernest Lister	7,629	17.45%
Democratic	Hugh C. Todd	7,322	16.75%
Democratic	E. C. Million	5,739	13.13%
Democratic	M. M. Godman	5,517	12.62%
Democratic	William Henry Dunphy	5,357	12.26%
Democratic	L. F. Chester	3,980	9.11%
Total votes		43,710	100.00%

== General election ==
=== Candidates ===
Major party candidates

- Ernest Lister, Democratic
- Marion E. Hay, Republican

Other candidates

- Robert T. Hodge, Progressive
- Anna A. Maley, Socialist
- George F. Stivers, Prohibition
- Abraham Lincoln Brearcliff, Socialist Labor

=== Results ===
1912 Washington gubernatorial election
Party	Candidate	Votes	%	±%
Democratic	Ernest Lister	97,251	30.55%	−2.45%
Republican	Marion E. Hay (incumbent)	96,629	30.35%	−32.21%
Progressive	Robert T. Hodge	77,792	24.44%	
Socialist	Anna A. Maley	37,155	11.67%	+9.23%
Prohibition	George F. Stivers	8,163	2.56%	+0.57%
Socialist Labor	Abraham Lincoln Brearcliff	1,369	0.43%	
Majority		622	0.20%	
Total votes		318,359	100.00%	
Democratic gain from Republican		Swing	+29.75%	

=== Results by county ===
County	Ernest Lister Democratic		Marion E. Hay Republican		Robert T. Hodge Progressive		Anna A. Maley Socialist		George F. Stivers Prohibition		Abraham L. Brearcliff Socialist Labor		Margin		Total votes cast
County	#	%	#	%	#	%	#	%	#	%	#	%	#	%	Total votes cast
Adams	970	42.34%	847	36.97%	286	12.48%	138	6.02%	43	1.88%	7	0.31%	123	5.37%	2,291
Asotin	501	25.47%	802	45.57%	250	14.20%	127	7.22%	76	4.32%	4	0.23%	-301	-17.10%	1,760
Benton	1,199	32.34%	1,486	40.06%	623	16.81%	320	8.63%	58	1.56%	21	0.57%	-287	-7.74%	3,707
Chehalis	1,907	21.69%	3,644	41.44%	1,336	15.19%	1,735	19.73%	141	1.60%	31	0.35%	-1,737	-19.75%	8,794
Chelan	1,037	20.28%	1,802	35.24%	1,480	28.94%	634	12.40%	140	2.74%	21	0.41%	-322 (Note: Hay's margin over Hodge)	-6.30%	5,114
Clallam	422	16.78%	781	31.05%	670	26.64%	617	24.53%	17	0.68%	8	0.32%	-111	-4.41%	2,515
Clark	2,434	31.48%	2,532	32.74%	1,326	17.15%	951	12.30%	466	6.03%	24	0.31%	-98	-1.27%	7,733
Columbia	986	39.05%	830	32.87%	513	20.32%	148	5.86%	46	1.82%	2	0.08%	156	6.18%	2,525
Cowlitz	803	21.04%	1,352	35.42%	1,103	28.90%	501	13.13%	53	1.39%	5	0.13%	-249	-6.52%	3,817
Douglas	1,352	43.66%	837	27.03%	550	17.76%	290	9.36%	61	1.97%	7	0.23%	515	16.63%	3,097
Ferry	538	32.20%	577	34.53%	251	15.02%	269	16.10%	10	0.60%	26	1.56%	-39	-2.33%	1,671
Franklin	508	29.18%	717	41.18%	206	11.83%	270	15.51%	32	1.84%	8	0.46%	-209	-12.00%	1,741
Garfield	473	30.92%	369	24.12%	585	38.24%	71	4.64%	31	2.03%	1	0.07%	-112 (Note: Hodge's margin over Lister)	-7.32%	1,530
Grant	720	27.94%	906	35.16%	533	20.68%	372	14.44%	38	1.47%	8	0.31%	-186	-7.22%	2,577
Island	272	17.63%	443	28.71%	435	28.19%	326	21.13%	66	4.28%	1	0.06%	-8	-0.52%	1,543
Jefferson	602	26.57%	893	39.41%	485	21.40%	273	12.05%	6	0.26%	7	0.31%	-291	-12.84%	2,266
King	26,243	37.07%	18,927	26.74%	18,727	26.45%	5,594	7.90%	825	1.17%	476	0.67%	7,316	10.33%	70,792
Kitsap	1,031	17.39%	1,820	30.70%	1,572	26.51%	1,391	23.46%	76	1.28%	39	0.66%	-248	-4.19%	5,929
Kittitas	1,580	31.29%	1,422	28.16%	1,505	29.80%	411	8.14%	114	2.26%	18	0.36%	75 (Note: Lister's margin over Hodge)	1.49%	5,050
Klickitat	917	27.49%	1,565	46.91%	424	12.71%	334	10.01%	85	2.55%	11	0.33%	-648	-19.42%	3,336
Lewis	2,879	29.69%	3,127	32.25%	1,683	17.36%	1,667	17.19%	317	3.27%	24	0.25%	-248	-2.56%	9,697
Lincoln	1,733	36.72%	1,704	36.10%	963	20.40%	229	4.85%	77	1.63%	14	0.30%	29	0.61%	4,720
Mason	570	31.77%	483	26.92%	349	19.45%	374	20.85%	13	0.72%	5	0.28%	87	4.85%	1,794
Okanogan	1,196	28.42%	1,577	37.48%	516	12.26%	874	20.77%	28	0.67%	17	0.40%	-381	-9.05%	4,208
Pacific	904	22.56%	1,755	43.80%	916	22.86%	347	8.66%	78	1.95%	7	0.17%	-839	-20.94%	4,007
Pend Oreille	641	31.48%	778	38.21%	286	14.05%	302	14.83%	26	1.28%	3	0.15%	-137	-6.73%	2,036
Pierce	10,724	34.00%	6,972	22.10%	9,514	30.16%	3,506	11.11%	711	2.25%	118	0.37%	1,210	3.84%	31,545
San Juan	269	22.32%	414	34.36%	285	23.65%	217	18.01%	15	1.24%	5	0.41%	-129	-10.71%	1,205
Skagit	2.090	22.91%	2,579	28.27%	2,389	26.19%	1,642	18.00%	369	4.05%	53	0.58%	-190	-2.08%	9,122
Skamania	230	28.29%	343	42.19%	147	18.08%	83	10.21%	7	0.86%	3	0.37%	-113	-13.90%	813
Snohomish	3,597	19.09%	3,677	19.52%	6,930	36.79%	3,847	20.42%	700	3.72%	88	0.47%	-3,083 (Note: Hodge's margin over Maley; Maley ran ahead of both Lister and Hay in this county)	-16.37%	18,839
Spokane	10,576	30.54%	11,792	34.05%	9,387	27.11%	2,047	5.91%	704	2.03%	122	0.35%	-1,216	-3.51%	34,628
Stevens	1,873	31.82%	1,547	26.28%	1,227	20.85%	971	16.50%	245	4.16%	23	0.39%	326	5.54%	5,886
Thurston	1,634	25.88%	1,974	31.26%	1,397	22.13%	1,138	18.02%	160	2.53%	11	0.17%	-340	-5.38%	6,314
Wahkiakum	134	15.65%	374	43.69%	228	26.64%	107	12.50%	10	1.17%	3	0.35%	-146	-17.05%	856
Walla Walla	3,386	45.21%	2,355	31.44%	1,309	17.48%	313	4.18%	115	1.54%	12	0.16%	1,031	13.77%	7,490
Whatcom	2,785	18.83%	4,576	30.93%	4,014	27.13%	2,924	19.76%	420	2.84%	75	0.51%	-562	-3.80%	14,794
Whitman	3,519	36.19%	3,481	35.80%	1,034	10.63%	574	5.90%	1,099	11.30%	16	0.16%	38	0.39%	9,723
Yakima	4,016	31.29%	4,569	35.60%	2,297	17.90%	1,221	9.51%	685	5.34%	45	0.35%	-553	-4.31%	12,833
Totals	97,251	30.55%	96,629	30.35%	77,792 (Note: The county figures add up to 77,731)	24.44%	37,155	11.67%	8,163	2.56%	1,369	0.43%	622	0.20%	318,359

==== Counties that flipped from Republican to Democratic ====
- Adams
- Columbia
- Douglas
- King
- Kittitas
- Lincoln
- Mason
- Pierce
- Stevens
- Walla Walla
- Whitman

==== Counties that flipped from Republican to Progressive ====
- Garfield
- Snohomish
