= Bevens Creek =

Stream in Carver and Sibley County, Minnesota, U.S.

Coordinates: 44°41′28″N 93°40′42″W

- Native name: Ip̣a Hmihma Wakpa (Dakota)

Physical characteristics
- Source: A swamp near Cologne
- Mouth: Minnesota River
- Length: thirty-nine miles (63 km)
- Basin size: 61,000 acres

Bevens Creek is a stream in Carver and Sibley counties, in the U.S. state of Minnesota. It has a tributary, Silver Creek.

Bevens Creek was named for an early settler. Its older Dakota language name is Ip̣a Hmihma Wakpa, which can be translated as "Round Point River" - a reference to a bluff in San Francisco Township near the mouth of the creek that was known as Ip̣a Hmihma or Round Point.

A dam used to exist along the creek, built in the 1950s. In 2014, the dam broke due to record rainfall. In 2022, the remains of the dam were demolished.

== See also ==
- List of rivers of Minnesota
