= Hahn Lake =

Lake in the state of Minnesota, United States

- Location within Minnesota
- Location: Sibley County, Minnesota
- Coordinates: 44°38′21″N 94°13′54″W
- Type: lake

Hahn Lake is a lake in Sibley County, in the U.S. state of Minnesota.

Hahn Lake was named for William Hahn, a pioneer who settled near the lake in 1879.
