= Browns Pond =

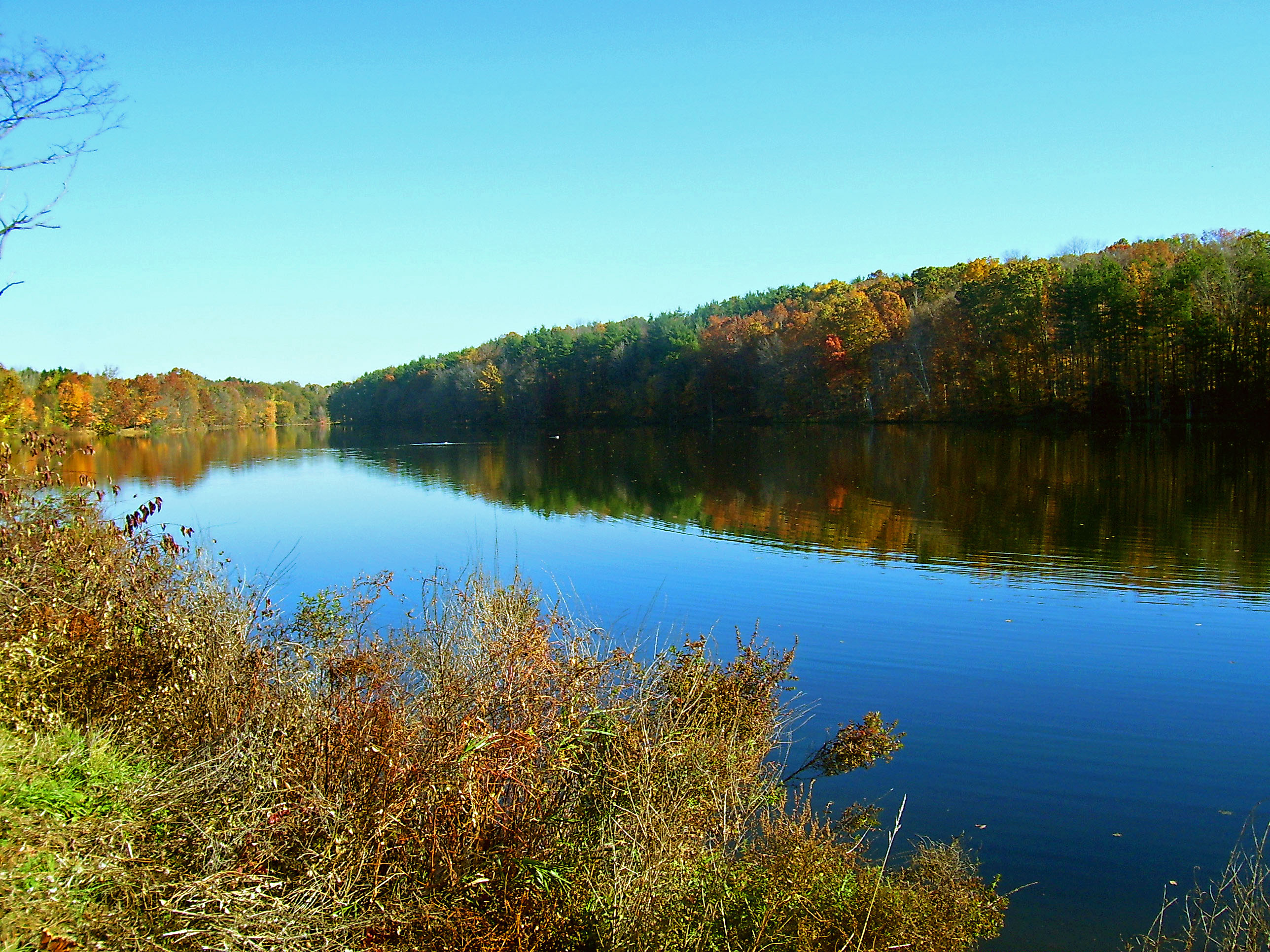
- on a fall morning

- Location within New York Location within the United States
- Location: Orange County, New York
- Coordinates: 41°28′34″N 74°05′24″W
- Type: reservoir
- Basin countries: United States
- Surface area: 0.3 mi^{2} (78 ha)

Browns Pond, in the Town of New Windsor in Orange County, New York, United States, is the smaller of two reservoirs for the nearby City of Newburgh. The 0.3 square miles (78 ha) pond is hook-shaped, with the circuitous Mount Airy Road running past both ends.

Its outlet streams ultimately feed Silver Stream, which is a tributary of the Moodna Creek. The Catskill Aqueduct, which the city uses as a supplementary supply, runs between the two.

Unlike Lake Washington, there are no recreational facilities on the reservoir.

== See also ==
- List of reservoirs and dams in New York
