= Lafayette, Minnesota =

City in Minnesota, United States

Lafayette
- City
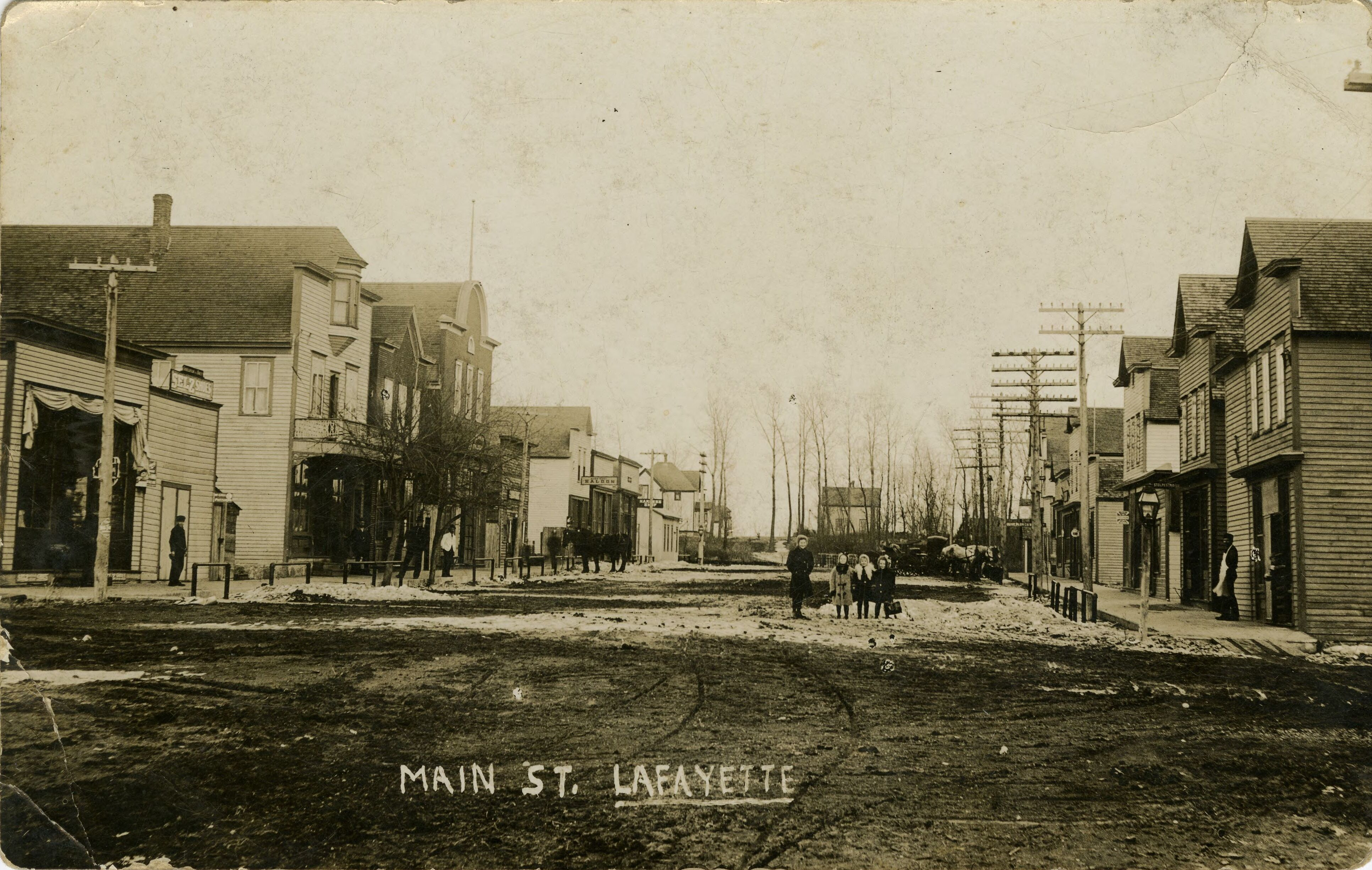
- Business district, circa 1906

- Location of Lafayette, Minnesota
- Coordinates: 44°26′50″N 94°23′34″W
- Country: United States
- State: Minnesota
- County: Nicollet

Government
  - Type: Mayor - Council
  - Mayor: Darren Saffert

Area
  - Total: 1.26 sq mi (3.26 km^{2})
  - Land: 1.26 sq mi (3.26 km^{2})
  - Water: 0 sq mi (0.00 km^{2})
- Elevation: 1,020 ft (310 m)

Population (2020)
  - Total: 492
  - Density: 391.2/sq mi (151.05/km^{2})
- Time zone: UTC-6 (Central (CST))
  - Summer (DST): UTC-5 (CDT)
- ZIP code: 56054
- Area code: 507
- FIPS code: 27-33920
- GNIS feature ID: 2395584
- Website: https://lafayettemn.com/

Lafayette is a city in Nicollet County, Minnesota, United States. The population was 492 at the 2020 census. It is a farming community just outside the larger town of New Ulm.

Lafayette is part of the Mankato-North Mankato Metropolitan Statistical Area.

== History ==
Lafayette was platted in 1897, and named for Gilbert du Motier, Marquis de Lafayette (1757–1834), a French and American Revolutionary War general.

== Geography ==
According to the U.S. Census Bureau, the city has a total area of 1.15 square miles (2.98 km^{2}), all land. The South Branch Rush River starts near Lafayette.

Minnesota State Highway 15 serves as a main route in the community.

== Demographics ==
Historical population
Census	Pop.	Note	%±
1910	195		—
1920	309		58.5%
1930	389		25.9%
1940	400		2.8%
1950	438		9.5%
1960	516		17.8%
1970	498		−3.5%
1980	507		1.8%
1990	462		−8.9%
2000	529		14.5%
2010	504		−4.7%
2020	492		−2.4%
U.S. Decennial Census; 2020 Census

As of 2000 the median income for a household in the city was $36,719, and the median income for a family was $43,611. Males had a median income of $31,250 versus $21,563 for females. The per capita income for the city was $15,347. About 3.1% of families and 2.9% of the population were below the poverty line, including 2.8% of those under age 18 and 7.0% of those age 95 or over.

=== 2010 census ===
As of the census of 2010, there were 504 people, 218 households, and 131 families residing in the city. The population density was 438.3 inhabitants per square mile (169.2/km^{2}). There were 244 housing units at an average density of 212.2 per square mile (81.9/km^{2}). The racial makeup of the city was 97.8% White, 0.2% Native American, 0.2% Asian, 1.2% from other races, and 0.6% from two or more races. Hispanic or Latino of any race were 2.4% of the population.

There were 218 households, of which 33.0% had children under the age of 18 living with them, 47.2% were married couples living together, 4.6% had a female householder with no husband present, 8.3% had a male householder with no wife present, and 39.9% were non-families. 36.2% of all households were made up of individuals, and 20.6% had someone living alone who was 65 years of age or older. The average household size was 2.31 and the average family size was 2.95.

The median age in the city was 36.9 years. 27% of residents were under the age of 18; 6.2% were between the ages of 18 and 24; 25.6% were from 25 to 44; 26.3% were from 45 to 64; and 14.7% were 65 years of age or older. The gender makeup of the city was 49.4% male and 50.6% female.

== Notable person ==
Lafayette was the childhood home of actress Tippi Hedren. In her book Cats of Shambala, she wrote that she was born in New Ulm as Lafayette did not have a hospital.
