= Lake Washington County Park =

- Location within Minnesota
- Location: Le Sueur County, Minnesota - near Kasota.
- Coordinates: 44°16′03″N 93°54′00″W
- Area: 164 acres (0.66 km^{2})
- Established: 1971
- Governing body: Le Sueur County, Minnesota
- Website: Lake Washington County Park

Successfully de-orphaned! Wikiproject Orphanage: You can help!

Lake Washington County Park is a 164-acre (66 ha) park in Le Sueur County in the U.S. state of Minnesota. The park is located on the northwest shore of Lake Washington, about 10 miles northeast of Mankato. The lake is named after President George Washington. The park was established in 1971 by the Le Sueur County Government. There are hiking trails, 31-site campground, and a Community Building among other public amenities.
