= Rush River (Minnesota) =

Waterway in Minnesota, U.S.

Coordinates: 44.5002°N 93.8980°W

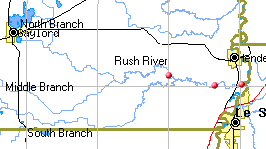
Map of Rush River, and parts of its tributaries. The mostly vertical squiggly green line is both the Sibley-Le Sueur county line, and the course of the Minnesota River.

The Rush River, in the U.S. state of Minnesota, is a 19.8-mile-long (31.9 km) waterway located entirely in Sibley County, although its watershed also includes parts of Nicollet and McLeod counties. It is a tributary of the Minnesota River.

The Rush River begins at the junction of its Middle and North Branches, at approximately 94.1W longitude, and 44.5N latitude. It then flows generally to the east, with the South Branch joining it at approximately 94.0W and 44.5N. It continues east until it joins the Minnesota River 2.5 miles (4.0 km) north-northeast of Le Sueur, Minnesota, which then proceeds generally north and east until it joins the Mississippi River.

== North Branch Rush River ==
The North Branch Rush River drains from Titlow Lake east of Gaylord, Minnesota, and flows 11.3 miles (18.2 km) southeast, joining the Middle Branch Rush River to form the Rush River.

== Middle Branch Rush River ==
The Middle Branch Rush River starts northwest of Gibbon, Minnesota and flows 36.0 miles (57.9 km) east until it joins the North Branch and forms the Rush River.

== South Branch Rush River ==
The South Branch Rush River starts between Winthrop and Lafayette, 10 miles (16 km) west-southwest of Gaylord near the Sibley-Nicollet county line, and flows 34.1 miles (54.9 km) east until it joins the Rush River.

== See also ==
- List of rivers of Minnesota
