= Alfsborg Township, Sibley County, Minnesota =

Township in Minnesota, United States

Alfsborg Township, Minnesota
- Township
- Location within the state of Minnesota Alfsborg Township, Minnesota (the United States)
- Coordinates: 44°29′29″N 94°19′26″W
- Country: United States
- State: Minnesota
- County: Sibley

Area
  - Total: 35.1 sq mi (90.9 km^{2})
  - Land: 35.1 sq mi (90.8 km^{2})
  - Water: 0.077 sq mi (0.2 km^{2})
- Elevation: 1,001 ft (305 m)

Population (2000)
  - Total: 356
  - Density: 10/sq mi (3.9/km^{2})
- Time zone: UTC-6 (Central (CST))
  - Summer (DST): UTC-5 (CDT)
- FIPS code: 27-00982
- GNIS feature ID: 0663414

Alfsborg Township is a township in Sibley County, Minnesota, United States. The population was 356 at the 2000 census.

== History ==
Alfsborg Township was organized on January 26, 1869, and named after Älvsborg County in Sweden.

== Geography ==
According to the United States Census Bureau, the township has a total area of 35.1 square miles (91 km^{2}), of which 35.0 square miles (91 km^{2}) is land and 0.1 square miles (0.26 km^{2}) (0.17%) is water.

== Demographics ==
As of the census of 2000, there were 356 people, 126 households, and 108 families residing in the township. The population density was 10.2 people per square mile (3.9/km^{2}). There were 134 housing units at an average density of 3.8/sq mi (1.5/km^{2}). The racial makeup of the township was 98.88% White, 0.28% Asian, 0.84% from other races. Hispanic or Latino of any race were 0.56% of the population.

There were 126 households, out of which 40.5% had children under the age of 18 living with them, 77.0% were married couples living together, 4.8% had a female householder with no husband present, and 13.5% were non-families. 10.3% of all households were made up of individuals, and 0.8% had someone living alone who was 65 years of age or older. The average household size was 2.83 and the average family size was 3.02.

In the township the population was spread out, with 29.2% under the age of 18, 4.2% from 18 to 24, 27.5% from 25 to 44, 23.6% from 45 to 64, and 15.4% who were 65 years of age or older. The median age was 38 years. For every 100 females, there were 113.2 males. For every 100 females age 18 and over, there were 115.4 males.

The median income for a household in the township was $42,250, and the median income for a family was $40,000. Males had a median income of $30,865 versus $21,786 for females. The per capita income for the township was $16,517. About 6.9% of families and 12.2% of the population were below the poverty line, including 23.1% of those under age 18 and none of those age 65 or over.
