= Lake Washington (Meeker County, Minnesota) =

Lake in the state of Minnesota, United States

Coordinates: 45.0690°N 94.3740°W

- Location within Minnesota Location within the United States
- Location: Meeker County, Minnesota
- Type: Natural freshwater lake
- Basin countries: United States
- Max. length: 3.21 mi (5.17 km)
- Max. width: 1.67 mi (2.69 km)
- Surface area: 2,639 acres (1,068 ha)
- Max. depth: 17 ft (5.2 m)
- Surface elevation: 1,066 ft (325 m)

Lake Washington is a lake located between Dassel and Darwin in Meeker County, in the U.S. state of Minnesota.

Lake Washington was named for George Washington, first President of the United States. The maximum depth of Lake Washington is 17 feet deep and is known for its walleye and bass fishery. Eurasian Watermilfoil was discovered in the lake in 1999 and Zebra Mussels were found in 2015 and have recently increased in numbers. Lake Washington is connected to Lake Stella by a navigable channel on the west side of the lake.

== See also ==
- List of lakes in Minnesota
