= Washington Lake (Sibley County, Minnesota) =

Lake in the state of Minnesota, United States

- Location within Minnesota
- Location: Sibley County, Minnesota
- Coordinates: 44°40′25″N 93°56′23″W
- Type: lake

Washington Lake is a lake in Sibley County, in the U.S. state of Minnesota. The first pioneers to settle at the lake being natives of Washington, D.C., caused the name to be selected.

== See also ==
- List of lakes in Minnesota
