= Moltke Township, Sibley County, Minnesota =

Moltke Township, Minnesota
- Township
- Location within the state of Minnesota Moltke Township, Minnesota (the United States)
- Coordinates: 44°34′44″N 94°32′59″W
- Country: United States
- State: Minnesota
- County: Sibley

Area
  - Total: 39.0 sq mi (101.1 km^{2})
  - Land: 39.0 sq mi (101.1 km^{2})
  - Water: 0 sq mi (0.0 km^{2})
- Elevation: 1,053 ft (321 m)

Population (2000)
  - Total: 337
  - Density: 8.5/sq mi (3.3/km^{2})
- Time zone: UTC-6 (Central (CST))
  - Summer (DST): UTC-5 (CDT)
- FIPS code: 27-43612
- GNIS feature ID: 0665007

Moltke Township is a township in Sibley County, Minnesota, United States. The population was 337 at the 2000 census.

== History ==
Moltke Township was organized in 1878, and named for Helmuth von Moltke the Elder (1800–1891), Chief of the Prussian, and then German, General Staff.

== Geography ==
According to the United States Census Bureau, the township has a total area of 39.0 square miles (101.1 km^{2}), all land.

== Demographics ==
As of the census of 2000, there were 337 people, 119 households, and 96 families residing in the township. The population density was 8.6 people per square mile (3.3/km^{2}). There were 127 housing units at an average density of 3.3/sq mi (1.3/km^{2}). The racial makeup of the township was 98.22% White, 0.59% African American, 0.59% Asian, and 0.59% from two or more races. Hispanic or Latino of any race were 1.48% of the population.

There were 119 households, out of which 39.5% had children under the age of 18 living with them, 73.9% were married couples living together, 3.4% had a female householder with no husband present, and 19.3% were non-families. 18.5% of all households were made up of individuals, and 7.6% had someone living alone who was 65 years of age or older. The average household size was 2.83 and the average family size was 3.22.

In the township the population was spread out, with 30.6% under the age of 18, 6.8% from 18 to 24, 27.6% from 25 to 44, 21.7% from 45 to 64, and 13.4% who were 65 years of age or older. The median age was 38 years. For every 100 females, there were 123.2 males. For every 100 females age 18 and over, there were 112.7 males.

The median income for a household in the township was $45,234, and the median income for a family was $46,058. Males had a median income of $26,875 versus $18,000 for females. The per capita income for the township was $16,737. About 4.2% of families and 5.0% of the population were below the poverty line, including 6.1% of those under age 18 and none of those age 65 or over.
