= Lake Washington (Providence County, Rhode Island) =

Lake in Rhode Island, United States

- Location within Rhode Island Location within the United States
- Location: Providence County, Rhode Island, United States
- Coordinates: 41.91621°N 71.757014°W
- Basin countries: United States
- Surface elevation: 184 metres (604 ft)

Lake Washington is a lake in the town of Glocester, Providence County, Rhode Island.
