= New Auburn Township, Sibley County, Minnesota =

New Auburn Township, Minnesota
- Township
- Location within the state of Minnesota New Auburn Township, Minnesota (the United States)
- Coordinates: 44°40′33″N 94°11′16″W
- Country: United States
- State: Minnesota
- County: Sibley

Area
  - Total: 35.8 sq mi (92.7 km^{2})
  - Land: 32.0 sq mi (82.8 km^{2})
  - Water: 3.8 sq mi (9.9 km^{2})
- Elevation: 1,010 ft (308 m)

Population (2000)
  - Total: 464
  - Density: 15/sq mi (5.6/km^{2})
- Time zone: UTC-6 (Central (CST))
  - Summer (DST): UTC-5 (CDT)
- ZIP code: 55366
- Area code: 320
- FIPS code: 27-45394
- GNIS feature ID: 0665088

New Auburn Township is a township in Sibley County, Minnesota, United States. The population was 464 at the 2000 census.

New Auburn Township was organized in 1858, and named after Auburn, New York.

== Geography ==
According to the United States Census Bureau, the township has a total area of 35.8 square miles (92.7 km^{2}), of which 32.0 square miles (82.8 km^{2}) is land and 3.8 square miles (9.9 km^{2}) (10.67%) is water.

== Demographics ==
As of the census of 2000, there were 464 people, 164 households, and 130 families residing in the township. The population density was 14.5 people per square mile (5.6/km^{2}). There were 167 housing units at an average density of 5.2/sq mi (2.0/km^{2}). The racial makeup of the township was 98.06% White, 0.65% Native American, 0.65% from other races, and 0.65% from two or more races. Hispanic or Latino of any race were 0.65% of the population.

There were 164 households, out of which 34.8% had children under the age of 18 living with them, 71.3% were married couples living together, 3.7% had a female householder with no husband present, and 20.7% were non-families. 15.2% of all households were made up of individuals, and 7.9% had someone living alone who was 65 years of age or older. The average household size was 2.83 and the average family size was 3.19.

In the township the population was spread out, with 27.2% under the age of 18, 7.3% from 18 to 24, 24.1% from 25 to 44, 25.9% from 45 to 64, and 15.5% who were 65 years of age or older. The median age was 40 years. For every 100 females, there were 106.2 males. For every 100 females age 18 and over, there were 115.3 males.

The median income for a household in the township was $48,750, and the median income for a family was $57,500. Males had a median income of $33,036 versus $22,308 for females. The per capita income for the township was $19,149. About 6.0% of families and 6.9% of the population were below the poverty line, including 9.4% of those under age 18 and 11.9% of those age 65 or over.
