= Severance Township, Sibley County, Minnesota =

Severance Township, Minnesota
- Township
- Location within the state of Minnesota Severance Township, Minnesota (the United States)
- Coordinates: 44°29′27″N 94°33′42″W
- Country: United States
- State: Minnesota
- County: Sibley

Area
  - Total: 38.1 sq mi (98.6 km^{2})
  - Land: 36.5 sq mi (94.5 km^{2})
  - Water: 1.6 sq mi (4.1 km^{2})
- Elevation: 1,040 ft (317 m)

Population (2000)
  - Total: 343
  - Density: 9.3/sq mi (3.6/km^{2})
- Time zone: UTC-6 (Central (CST))
  - Summer (DST): UTC-5 (CDT)
- FIPS code: 27-59242
- GNIS feature ID: 0665577

Severance Township is a township in Sibley County, Minnesota, United States. The population was 343 at the 2000 census.

== History ==
Severance Township was originally called Clear Lake Township, and under the latter name was organized in 1870. The name was later changed, to Severance, after Martin Juan Severance, a state legislator.

== Geography ==
According to the United States Census Bureau, the township has a total area of 38.1 square miles (98.6 km^{2}), of which 36.5 square miles (94.5 km^{2}) is land and 1.6 square miles (4.1 km^{2}) (4.15%) is water.

== Demographics ==
As of the census of 2000, there were 343 people, 119 households, and 96 families residing in the township. The population density was 9.4 people per square mile (3.6/km^{2}). There were 123 housing units at an average density of 3.4/sq mi (1.3/km^{2}). The racial makeup of the township was 97.38% White, 0.29% African American, 0.29% Asian, 0.87% from other races, and 1.17% from two or more races. Hispanic or Latino of any race were 1.17% of the population.

There were 119 households, out of which 43.7% had children under the age of 18 living with them, 69.7% were married couples living together, 3.4% had a female householder with no husband present, and 19.3% were non-families. 16.8% of all households were made up of individuals, and 6.7% had someone living alone who was 65 years of age or older. The average household size was 2.88 and the average family size was 3.24.

In the township the population was spread out, with 29.2% under the age of 18, 8.5% from 18 to 24, 26.2% from 25 to 44, 23.3% from 45 to 64, and 12.8% who were 65 years of age or older. The median age was 36 years. For every 100 females, there were 117.1 males. For every 100 females age 18 and over, there were 129.2 males.

The median income for a household in the township was $39,063, and the median income for a family was $45,625. Males had a median income of $26,750 versus $27,500 for females. The per capita income for the township was $14,857. About 5.6% of families and 4.6% of the population were below the poverty line, including none of those under age 18 and 16.3% of those age 65 or over.
