= Sibley Township, Sibley County, Minnesota =

Sibley Township, Minnesota
- Township
- Location within the state of Minnesota Sibley Township, Minnesota (the United States)
- Coordinates: 44°29′52″N 94°11′26″W
- Country: United States
- State: Minnesota
- County: Sibley

Area
  - Total: 35.6 sq mi (92.3 km^{2})
  - Land: 35.6 sq mi (92.2 km^{2})
  - Water: 0.039 sq mi (0.1 km^{2})
- Elevation: 971 ft (296 m)

Population (2000)
  - Total: 353
  - Density: 9.8/sq mi (3.8/km^{2})
- Time zone: UTC-6 (Central (CST))
  - Summer (DST): UTC-5 (CDT)
- FIPS code: 27-60124
- GNIS feature ID: 0665608

Sibley Township is a township in Sibley County, Minnesota, United States. The population was 353 at the 2000 census.

Sibley Township was organized in 1864.

== Geography ==
According to the United States Census Bureau, the township has a total area of 35.7 square miles (92.3 km^{2}), of which 35.6 square miles (92.2 km^{2}) is land and 0.1 square mile (0.1 km^{2}) (0.14%) is water.

== Demographics ==
As of the census of 2000, there were 353 people, 115 households, and 90 families residing in the township. The population density was 9.9 people per square mile (3.8/km^{2}). There were 127 housing units at an average density of 3.6/sq mi (1.4/km^{2}). The racial makeup of the township was 99.43% White, 0.28% African American and 0.28% Asian.

There were 115 households, out of which 43.5% had children under the age of 18 living with them, 74.8% were married couples living together, 1.7% had a female householder with no husband present, and 21.7% were non-families. 18.3% of all households were made up of individuals, and 3.5% had someone living alone who was 65 years of age or older. The average household size was 3.07 and the average family size was 3.52.

In the township the population was spread out, with 30.9% under the age of 18, 10.5% from 18 to 24, 28.9% from 25 to 44, 21.0% from 45 to 64, and 8.8% who were 65 years of age or older. The median age was 36 years. For every 100 females, there were 122.0 males. For every 100 females age 18 and over, there were 130.2 males.

The median income for a household in the township was $39,125, and the median income for a family was $40,000. Males had a median income of $27,750 versus $20,833 for females. The per capita income for the township was $14,814. About 8.3% of families and 11.1% of the population were below the poverty line, including 10.8% of those under age 18 and 10.0% of those age 65 or over.
