= Transit Township, Sibley County, Minnesota =

Transit Township, Minnesota
- Township
- Location within the state of Minnesota Transit Township, Minnesota (the United States)
- Coordinates: 44°34′33″N 94°18′19″W
- Country: United States
- State: Minnesota
- County: Sibley

Area
  - Total: 35.6 sq mi (92.1 km^{2})
  - Land: 35.2 sq mi (91.1 km^{2})
  - Water: 0.39 sq mi (1.0 km^{2})
- Elevation: 1,024 ft (312 m)

Population (2000)
  - Total: 324
  - Density: 9.3/sq mi (3.6/km^{2})
- Time zone: UTC-6 (Central (CST))
  - Summer (DST): UTC-5 (CDT)
- FIPS code: 27-65380
- GNIS feature ID: 0665804

Transit Township is a township in Sibley County, Minnesota, United States. The population was 324 at the 2000 census.

== History ==
Transit Township was organized in 1866. According to Warren Upham, the name may come from the transit instruments used by railroad surveyors.

== Geography ==
According to the United States Census Bureau, the township has a total area of 35.6 square miles (92.1 km^{2}), of which 35.2 square miles (91.1 km^{2}) is land and 0.4 square mile (1.0 km^{2}) (1.10%) is water.

== Demographics ==
As of the census of 2000, there were 324 people, 119 households, and 91 families residing in the township. The population density was 9.2 people per square mile (3.6/km^{2}). There were 123 housing units at an average density of 3.5/sq mi (1.4/km^{2}). The racial makeup of the township was 98.46% White, 0.31% African American, 0.31% Native American, 0.31% from other races, and 0.62% from two or more races. Hispanic or Latino of any race were 0.62% of the population.

There were 119 households, out of which 26.1% had children under the age of 18 living with them, 69.7% were married couples living together, 2.5% had a female householder with no husband present, and 22.7% were non-families. 19.3% of all households were made up of individuals, and 6.7% had someone living alone who was 65 years of age or older. The average household size was 2.72 and the average family size was 3.13.

In the township the population was spread out, with 23.8% under the age of 18, 7.7% from 18 to 24, 23.8% from 25 to 44, 27.8% from 45 to 64, and 17.0% who were 65 years of age or older. The median age was 40 years. For every 100 females, there were 103.8 males. For every 100 females age 18 and over, there were 109.3 males.

The median income for a household in the township was $34,583, and the median income for a family was $35,833. Males had a median income of $28,542 versus $20,417 for females. The per capita income for the township was $23,658. About 4.3% of families and 5.3% of the population were below the poverty line, including none of those under the age of eighteen or sixty-five or over.
