= Lake Washington (Le Sueur and Blue Earth counties, Minnesota) =

Lake in Le Sueur and Blue Earth counties, Minnesota, United States of America

- Location within Minnesota
- Location: Le Sueur County, Minnesota
- Coordinates: 44°15′4″N 93°51′36″W
- Type: lake

Lake Washington is a lake in Le Sueur County, Minnesota and Blue Earth County, Minnesota, in the United States. The lake has a regional park, located on the northwest shore, which was acquired in two phases in 1971 and 1978. The park serves as a campgrounds area. The first structure on the lake was built in 1898. The lake has a summer camp for children on the lake, Camp Patterson, which hosts an average of 2,500 kids throughout the summer.

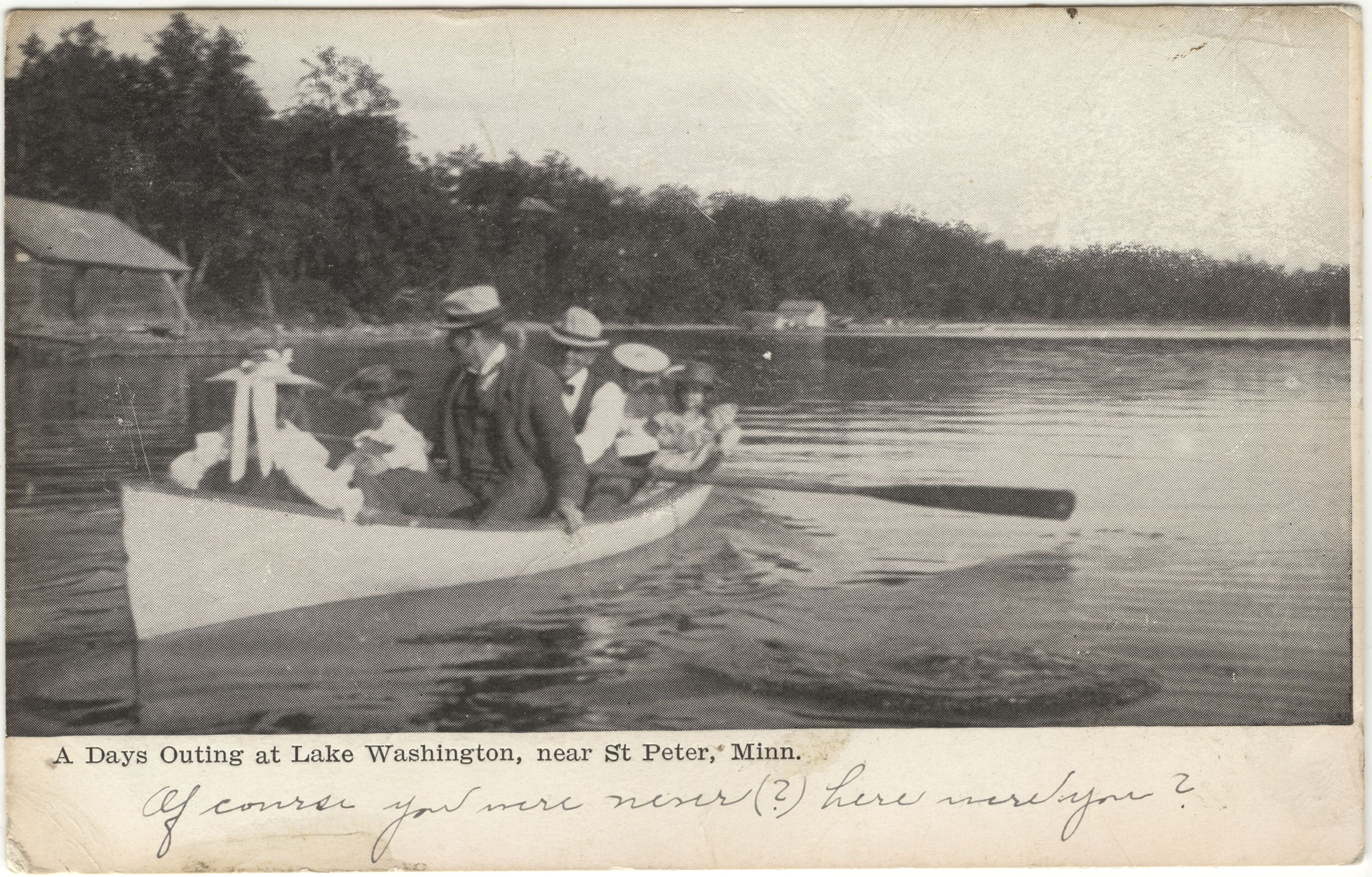
A Days Outing on Lake Washington, near St. Peter, Minnesota.

Lake Washington was named after the President George Washington and northwest of it lies the Lake Washington County Park also named after the President.

== See also ==
- List of lakes in Minnesota
