= Bismarck Township, Sibley County, Minnesota =

Bismarck Township, Minnesota
- Township
- Location within the state of Minnesota Bismarck Township, Minnesota (the United States)
- Coordinates: 44°35′25″N 94°26′35″W
- Country: United States
- State: Minnesota
- County: Sibley

Area
  - Total: 36.1 sq mi (93.5 km^{2})
  - Land: 36.0 sq mi (93.3 km^{2})
  - Water: 0.077 sq mi (0.2 km^{2})
- Elevation: 1,063 ft (324 m)

Population (2000)
  - Total: 376
  - Density: 10/sq mi (4/km^{2})
- Time zone: UTC-6 (Central (CST))
  - Summer (DST): UTC-5 (CDT)
- FIPS code: 27-06130
- GNIS feature ID: 0663603

Bismarck Township is a township in Sibley County, Minnesota, United States. The population was 376 at the 2000 census.

Bismarck Township was organized in 1874, and named after Otto von Bismarck.

== Geography ==
According to the United States Census Bureau, the township has a total area of 36.1 square miles (93 km^{2}), of which 36.0 square miles (93 km^{2}) is land and 0.1 square miles (0.26 km^{2}) (0.17%) is water.

== Demographics ==
As of the census of 2000, there were 376 people, 99 households, and 71 families residing in the township. The population density was 10.4 inhabitants per square mile (4.0/km^{2}). There were 106 housing units at an average density of 2.9 per square mile (1.1/km^{2}). The racial makeup of the township was 99.73% White, and 0.27% from two or more races.

There were 99 households, out of which 36.4% had children under the age of 18 living with them, 68.7% were married couples living together, 2.0% had a female householder with no husband present, and 27.3% were non-families. 22.2% of all households were made up of individuals, and 10.1% had someone living alone who was 65 years of age or older. The average household size was 2.73 and the average family size was 3.24.

In the township the population was spread out, with 34.8% under the age of 18, 8.2% from 18 to 24, 27.9% from 25 to 44, 16.5% from 45 to 64, and 12.5% who were 65 years of age or older. The median age was 32 years. For every 100 females, there were 113.6 males. For every 100 females age 18 and over, there were 105.9 males.

The median income for a household in the township was $29,375, and the median income for a family was $38,125. Males had a median income of $26,154 versus $21,250 for females. The per capita income for the township was $12,727. About 7.7% of families and 19.2% of the population were below the poverty line, including 12.1% of those under age 18 and 3.8% of those age 65 or over.
