= Henderson Township, Sibley County, Minnesota =

Henderson Township, Minnesota
- Township
- Location within the state of Minnesota Henderson Township, Minnesota (the United States)
- Coordinates: 44°29′40″N 93°56′11″W
- Country: United States
- State: Minnesota
- County: Sibley

Area
  - Total: 30.2 sq mi (78.1 km^{2})
  - Land: 30.0 sq mi (77.6 km^{2})
  - Water: 0.23 sq mi (0.6 km^{2})
- Elevation: 961 ft (293 m)

Population (2000)
  - Total: 700
  - Density: 23/sq mi (9/km^{2})
- Time zone: UTC-6 (Central (CST))
  - Summer (DST): UTC-5 (CDT)
- ZIP code: 56044
- Area code: 507
- FIPS code: 27-28412
- GNIS feature ID: 0664447

Henderson Township is a township in Sibley County, Minnesota, United States. The population was 700 at the 2000 census.

Henderson was Joseph R. Brown's mother's maiden name.

== Geography ==
According to the United States Census Bureau, the township has a total area of 30.2 square miles (78 km^{2}), of which 29.9 square miles (77 km^{2}) is land and 0.2 square miles (0.52 km^{2}) (0.73%) is water.

== Demographics ==
As of the census of 2000, there were 700 people, 230 households, and 167 families residing in the township. The population density was 23.4 inhabitants per square mile (9.0/km^{2}). There were 235 housing units at an average density of 7.8 per square mile (3.0/km^{2}). The racial makeup of the township was 98.86% White, 0.29% Asian, and 0.86% from two or more races. Hispanic or Latino of any race were 1.57% of the population.

There were 230 households, out of which 37.8% had children under the age of 18 living with them, 65.2% were married couples living together, 2.2% had a female householder with no husband present, and 27.0% were non-families. 24.8% of all households were made up of individuals, and 7.4% had someone living alone who was 65 years of age or older. The average household size was 2.97 and the average family size was 3.48.

In the township the population was spread out, with 34.6% under the age of 18, 6.9% from 18 to 24, 30.6% from 25 to 44, 19.1% from 45 to 64, and 8.9% who were 65 years of age or older. The median age was 33 years. For every 100 females, there were 112.1 males. For every 100 females age 18 and over, there were 119.1 males.

The median income for a household in the township was $48,167, and the median income for a family was $54,583. Males had a median income of $35,000 versus $24,779 for females. The per capita income for the township was $18,502. About 7.7% of families and 11.1% of the population were below the poverty line, including 16.7% of those under age 18 and 7.5% of those age 65 or over.
