= Lake Washington (New York) =

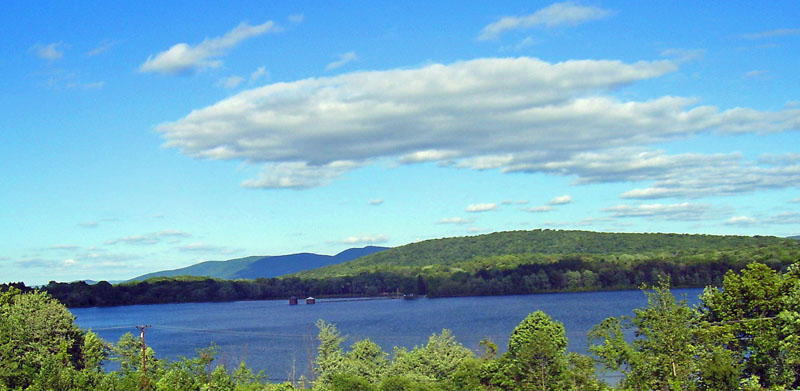

- Location within New York Location within the United States
- Location: Orange County, New York, United States
- Coordinates: 41°29′28″N 74°04′05″W
- Type: reservoir
- Primary inflows: Silver Stream
- Basin countries: United States
- Surface area: 167 acres (68 ha)
- Water volume: 1.5×10^{9} US gal (5,700,000 m^{3})
- Surface elevation: 301 ft (92 m)

Lake Washington is the primary reservoir for the city of Newburgh, New York, United States. It is located just southwest of the city, lying partially within it and the neighboring towns of Newburgh and New Windsor. It holds approximately 1.5 billion US gallons (5,700,000 m^{3}), an amount equivalent to the city's annual consumption.

Recreational facilities such as picnic grounds are accessible to the public at Masterson Park, near the reservoir's spillway along NY 207.

== History ==
Lake Washington was expanded and put into service as a reservoir in 1907, although it had been providing water to its predecessor, Monell's Pond, since 1852. The dam has been raised many times since then to increase capacity.

In 2016 the city briefly declared a water emergency and started using Browns Pond, its backup supply, when levels of perfluorooctane sulfonate (PFOS) near the federal Environmental Protection Agency guidelines of 200 parts per trillion (ppt) were found in the lake. It is not known yet where the PFOS came from; a pond on the Stewart Air Guard Base from which Silver Stream, one of Lake Washington's tributaries, rises, had levels of 5,900 ppt. If Brown's Pond runs out before the contamination can be remediated, the city would have to pay to draw from the Catskill Aqueduct, part of the New York City water supply system.

== Masterson Park ==
Resident Frank Masterson had long dreamed of a place where the disabled, senior citizens and military veterans could go to fish. After his death in 1973, his friends decided to honor his memory by establishing such a park, and it was opened the following year.

It is managed by the city's Recreation Department, and fishing is allowed from 6 a.m. to 6 p.m. Trout and pickerel, among others, can be taken. Boats can be rented for $6–14.

== See also ==
- List of reservoirs and dams in New York
