= Grafton Township, Sibley County, Minnesota =

Grafton Township, Minnesota
- Township
- Location within the state of Minnesota Grafton Township, Minnesota (the United States)
- Coordinates: 44°40′5″N 94°34′8″W
- Country: United States
- State: Minnesota
- County: Sibley

Area
  - Total: 39.2 sq mi (101.4 km^{2})
  - Land: 39.0 sq mi (101.0 km^{2})
  - Water: 0.15 sq mi (0.4 km^{2})
- Elevation: 1,070 ft (326 m)

Population (2000)
  - Total: 259
  - Density: 6.7/sq mi (2.6/km^{2})
- Time zone: UTC-6 (Central (CST))
  - Summer (DST): UTC-5 (CDT)
- FIPS code: 27-24794
- GNIS feature ID: 0664306

Grafton Township is a township in Sibley County, Minnesota, United States. The population was 259 at the 2000 census.

Grafton Township was organized in 1873.

== Geography ==
According to the United States Census Bureau, the township has a total area of 39.1 square miles (101 km^{2}), of which 39.0 square miles (101 km^{2}) is land and 0.2 square miles (0.52 km^{2}) (0.41%) is water.

== Demographics ==
At the 2000 census, there were 259 people, 89 households and 72 families residing in the township. The population density was 6.6 people per square mile (2.6/km^{2}). There were 100 housing units at an average density of 2.6/sq mi (1.0/km^{2}). The racial makeup of the township was 98.07% White, 0.77% Native American, and 1.16% from two or more races. Hispanic or Latino of any race were 1.16% of the population.

There were 89 households, of which 44.9% had children under the age of 18 living with them, 76.4% were married couples living together, 2.2% had a female householder with no husband present, and 18.0% were non-families. 15.7% of all households were made up of individuals, and 12.4% had someone living alone who was 65 years of age or older. The average household size was 2.91 and the average family size was 3.27.

Age distribution was 32.4% under the age of 18, 6.6% from 18 to 24, 28.2% from 25 to 44, 20.8% from 45 to 64, and 12.0% who were 65 years of age or older. The median age was 36 years. For every 100 females, there were 102.3 males. For every 100 females age 18 and over, there were 113.4 males.

The median household income was $45,250, and the median family income was $46,750. Males had a median income of $36,458 versus $15,833 for females. The per capita income for the township was $18,045. About 2.5% of families and 4.3% of the population were below the poverty line, including 2.2% of those under the age of eighteen and 7.1% of those 65 or over.
