= Green Isle Township, Sibley County, Minnesota =

Green Isle Township, Minnesota
- Township
- Location within the state of Minnesota Green Isle Township, Minnesota (the United States)
- Coordinates: 44°40′42″N 94°3′57″W
- Country: United States
- State: Minnesota
- County: Sibley

Area
  - Total: 36.3 sq mi (93.9 km^{2})
  - Land: 35.5 sq mi (91.9 km^{2})
  - Water: 0.77 sq mi (2.0 km^{2})
- Elevation: 994 ft (303 m)

Population (2000)
  - Total: 556
  - Density: 16/sq mi (6/km^{2})
- Time zone: UTC-6 (Central (CST))
  - Summer (DST): UTC-5 (CDT)
- ZIP code: 55338
- Area code: 507
- FIPS code: 27-25676
- GNIS feature ID: 0664341

Green Isle Township is a township in Sibley County, Minnesota, United States. The population was 556 at the 2000 census.

== History ==
Green Isle Township was organized in 1858, and given a name allusive of Ireland, the Emerald Isle, as many of its early settlers were from Ireland. One of the earliest settlers, Patrick O'Meara and his wife Margaret (née: Delaney) O'Meara, immigrated from County Galway, Ireland to the U.S. in 1840. They moved from the state of New York to the area that became Green Isle township in 1857, raising a large family and living out their remaining 50 years there. Patrick's obituary in the Green Isle Record in 1907 was titled "Sibley County Pioneer Dead", and stated that at the time of his arrival the area was "then but a wilderness".

The railroad tracks between Norwood and Morton, cutting through Green Isle Township, were originally built by the Minneapolis and St. Louis Railway (M&StL) around 1880. This enabled Green Isle Township farmers to easily transport their grain to Minneapolis mills, or vegetables to Twin Cities markets.

By the early 1900s Green Isle township was divided into hundreds of separate farms.

== Geography ==
According to the United States Census Bureau, the township has a total area of 36.3 square miles (94 km^{2}), of which 35.5 square miles (92 km^{2}) is land and 0.8 square miles (2.1 km^{2}) (2.12%) is water. It is bordered on the east by Washington Lake Township, the south by Arlington Township, the west by New Auburn Township, and the north by Glencoe Township in McLeod County.

== Demographics ==
As of the census of 2000, there were 556 people, 206 households, and 158 families residing in the township. The population density was 15.7 inhabitants per square mile (6.1/km^{2}). There were 212 housing units at an average density of 6.0 per square mile (2.3/km^{2}). The racial makeup of the township was 99.64% White, 0.18% African American and 0.18% Asian. Hispanic or Latino of any race were 0.18% of the population.

There were 206 households, out of which 35.0% had children under the age of 18 living with them, 69.9% were married couples living together, 3.9% had a female householder with no husband present, and 23.3% were non-families. 20.4% of all households were made up of individuals, and 10.2% had someone living alone who was 65 years of age or older. The average household size was 2.70 and the average family size was 3.18.

In the township the population was spread out, with 25.9% under the age of 18, 7.4% from 18 to 24, 27.3% from 25 to 44, 23.9% from 45 to 64, and 15.5% who were 65 years of age or older. The median age was 40 years. For every 100 females, there were 105.9 males. For every 100 females age 18 and over, there were 107.0 males.

The median income for a household in the township was $49,375, and the median income for a family was $52,250. Males had a median income of $30,781 versus $24,545 for females. The per capita income for the township was $18,371. About 1.2% of families and 1.7% of the population were below the poverty line, including 2.6% of those under age 18 and none of those age 65 or over.
