= Washington Lake Township, Sibley County, Minnesota =

Washington Lake Township, Minnesota
- Township
- Location within the state of Minnesota Washington Lake Township, Minnesota (the United States)
- Coordinates: 44°41′4″N 93°56′59″W
- Country: United States
- State: Minnesota
- County: Sibley

Area
  - Total: 35.4 sq mi (91.7 km^{2})
  - Land: 34.3 sq mi (88.9 km^{2})
  - Water: 1.1 sq mi (2.8 km^{2})
- Elevation: 980 ft (300 m)

Population (2000)
  - Total: 506
  - Density: 15/sq mi (5.7/km^{2})
- Time zone: UTC-6 (Central (CST))
  - Summer (DST): UTC-5 (CDT)
- FIPS code: 27-68368
- GNIS feature ID: 0665924

Washington Lake Township is a township in Sibley County, Minnesota, United States. The population was 506 at the 2000 census.

Washington Lake Township was organized in 1858, and named after Washington Lake.

== Geography ==
According to the United States Census Bureau, the township has a total area of 35.4 square miles (91.7 km^{2}), of which 34.3 square miles (88.9 km^{2}) is land and 1.1 square miles (2.8 km^{2}) (3.08%) is water.

== Demographics ==
As of the census of 2000, there were 506 people, 170 households, and 139 families residing in the township. The population density was 14.7 people per square mile (5.7/km^{2}). There were 178 housing units at an average density of 5.2/sq mi (2.0/km^{2}). The racial makeup of the township was 98.81% White, 0.20% African American, 0.20% Native American, 0.20% Asian, and 0.59% from two or more races.

There were 170 households, out of which 37.6% had children under the age of 18 living with them, 72.4% were married couples living together, 5.9% had a female householder with no husband present, and 18.2% were non-families. 12.9% of all households were made up of individuals, and 3.5% had someone living alone who was 65 years of age or older. The average household size was 2.98 and the average family size was 3.33.

In the township the population was spread out, with 28.3% under the age of 18, 8.5% from 18 to 24, 29.4% from 25 to 44, 23.3% from 45 to 64, and 10.5% who were 65 years of age or older. The median age was 37 years. For every 100 females, there were 109.1 males. For every 100 females age 18 and over, there were 107.4 males.

The median income for a household in the township was $46,528, and the median income for a family was $55,750. Males had a median income of $32,292 versus $21,944 for females. The per capita income for the township was $17,967. About 6.4% of families and 9.9% of the population were below the poverty line, including 16.9% of those under age 18 and 4.2% of those age 65 or over.
