= Faxon Township, Sibley County, Minnesota =

Faxon Township, Minnesota
- Township
- Location within the state of Minnesota Faxon Township, Minnesota (the United States)
- Coordinates: 44°39′28″N 93°48′32″W
- Country: United States
- State: Minnesota
- County: Sibley

Area
  - Total: 21.5 sq mi (55.6 km^{2})
  - Land: 21.0 sq mi (54.3 km^{2})
  - Water: 0.50 sq mi (1.3 km^{2})
- Elevation: 961 ft (293 m)

Population (2020)
  - Total: 712
  - Density: 33/sq mi (12.9/km^{2})
- Time zone: UTC-6 (Central (CST))
  - Summer (DST): UTC-5 (CDT)
- FIPS code: 27-20726
- GNIS feature ID: 0664151

Faxon Township is a township in Sibley County, Minnesota, United States. The population was 712 at the 2020 census.

Faxon Township was organized in 1858, and named for a local pioneer. In the fall of 1862, the women's column of Dakota women, children and elderly camped overnight south of Walkers landing, now Faxon, after having been attacked in Henderson. They were en route from the Lower Sioux Agency to Pike Island at Fort Snelling.

== Geography ==
According to the United States Census Bureau, the township has an area of 21.5 square miles (56 km^{2}), of which 21.0 square miles (54 km^{2}) is land and 0.5 square miles (1.3 km^{2}) (2.33%) is water.

== Demographics ==
As of the census of 2010, there were 701 people, 228 households, and 189 families residing in the township. The population density was 33.4 inhabitants per square mile (12.9/km^{2}). There were 193 housing units at an average density of 10.6 per square mile (4.1/km^{2}). The racial makeup of the township was 97.1% White, 1.6% Asian, 1.00% from other races, 0.50% from two or more races, and 0.1% Black or African American race. Hispanic or Latino of any race were 0.3% of the population.

There were 228 households, out of which 32.0% had children under the age of 18 living with them, 75.9% were married couples living together, 2.2% had a female householder with no husband present, and 17.1% were non-families. 11.4% of all households were made up of individuals living alone, and 2.2% had someone living alone who was 65 years of age or older. The average household size was 3.07 and the average family size was 3.35.

In the township the population was spread out, with 32.0% under the age of 18, 6.4% from 18 to 24, 24.3% from 25 to 44, 31.1% from 45 to 64, and 6.3% who were 65 years of age or older. The median age was 38.7 years. For every 100 females, there were 109.3 males. For every 100 females age 18 and over, there were 114.9 males.

Income information is not available from the official 2010 U.S. Census, so all the following information is from the 2010 Census. The median income for a household in the township was $59,375, and the median income for a family was $63,500. Males had a median income of $37,625 versus $30,096 for females. The per capita income for the township was $19,632. About 1.2% of families and 1.6% of the population were below the poverty line, including none of those under age 18 and 14.3% of those age 65 or over.
