= Arlington, Minnesota =

City in Minnesota, United States

Arlington
- City
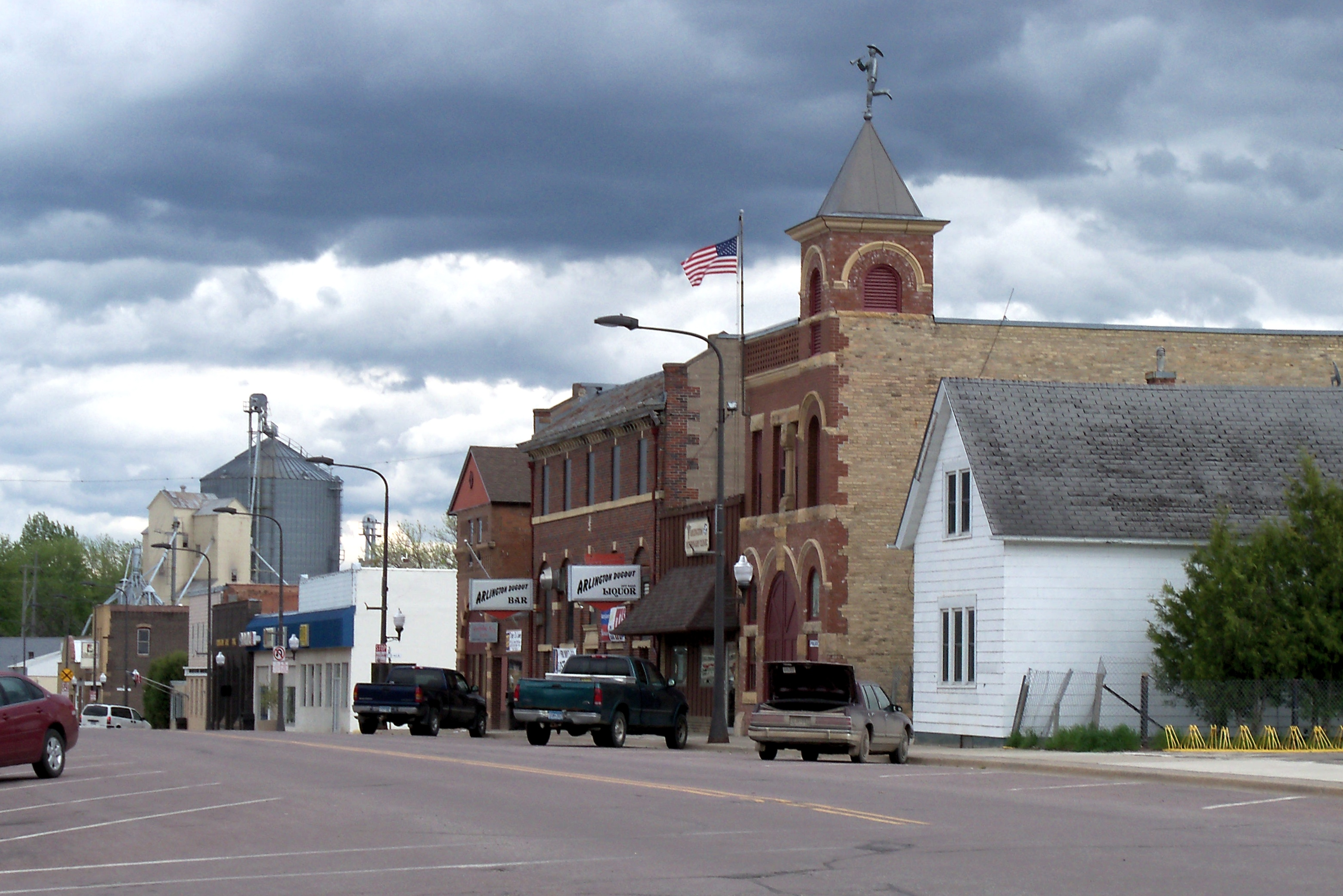
- Motto: "A Beautiful City Growing In Unity"
- Location of Arlington within Sibley County, Minnesota
- Coordinates: 44°36′30″N 94°04′37″W
- Country: United States
- State: Minnesota
- County: Sibley
- Established: 1856

Government
  - Type: Mayor – Council
  - Mayor: Matthew Scharpe

Area
  - Total: 1.61 sq mi (4.17 km^{2})
  - Land: 1.61 sq mi (4.17 km^{2})
  - Water: 0 sq mi (0.00 km^{2})
- Elevation: 997 ft (304 m)

Population (2020)
  - Total: 2,247
  - Density: 1,396.7/sq mi (539.25/km^{2})
- Time zone: UTC-6 (Central (CST))
  - Summer (DST): UTC-5 (CDT)
- ZIP code: 55307
- Area code: 507
- FIPS code: 27-02152
- GNIS feature ID: 2393985
- Website: https://www.arlingtonmn.gov/

Arlington is a city in Sibley County, Minnesota, United States. The population was 2,247 at the 2020 census.

== History ==
The community was platted in 1856, and the name was officially approved on May 11, 1858, the same day Minnesota became a state. German settlers came to the area to homestead beginning in the 1860s and 1870s. The population of Arlington continues to be of predominately German descent. In 1948, the community was incorporated as a city.

== Geography ==
According to the United States Census Bureau, the city has an area of 1.57 square miles (4.07 km^{2}), all land.

== Demographics ==
Historical population
Census	Pop.	Note	%±
1890	417		—
1900	712		70.7%
1910	733		2.9%
1920	776		5.9%
1930	915		17.9%
1940	1,122		22.6%
1950	1,313		17.0%
1960	1,601		21.9%
1970	1,823		13.9%
1980	1,779		−2.4%
1990	1,886		6.0%
2000	2,048		8.6%
2010	2,233		9.0%
2020	2,247		0.6%
U.S. Decennial Census; 2013 Estimate

=== 2020 census ===
As of the 2020 census, Arlington had a population of 2,247. The median age was 38.4 years. 25.6% of residents were under the age of 18 and 18.2% of residents were 65 years of age or older. For every 100 females there were 91.6 males, and for every 100 females age 18 and over there were 88.2 males age 18 and over.

0.0% of residents lived in urban areas, while 100.0% lived in rural areas.

There were 907 households in Arlington, of which 31.1% had children under the age of 18 living in them. Of all households, 46.7% were married-couple households, 17.9% were households with a male householder and no spouse or partner present, and 27.9% were households with a female householder and no spouse or partner present. About 32.4% of all households were made up of individuals and 17.5% had someone living alone who was 65 years of age or older.

There were 976 housing units, of which 7.1% were vacant. The homeowner vacancy rate was 0.5% and the rental vacancy rate was 3.8%.

Racial composition as of the 2020 census
Race	Number	Percent
White	1,877	83.5%
Black or African American	35	1.6%
American Indian and Alaska Native	5	0.2%
Asian	9	0.4%
Native Hawaiian and Other Pacific Islander	1	0.0%
Some other race	145	6.5%
Two or more races	175	7.8%
Hispanic or Latino (of any race)	341	15.2%

=== 2010 census ===
As of the census of 2010, there were 2,233 people, 911 households, and 549 families living in the city. The population density was 1,422.3 inhabitants per square mile (549.2/km^{2}). There were 1,018 housing units at an average density of 648.4 per square mile (250.3/km^{2}). The racial makeup of the city was 94.1% White, 0.1% African American, 0.1% Native American, 0.7% Asian, 3.6% from other races, and 1.4% from two or more races. Hispanic or Latino of any race were 9.4% of the population.

There were 911 households, of which 32.6% had children under the age of 18 living with them, 44.3% were married couples living together, 11.6% had a female householder with no husband present, 4.3% had a male householder with no wife present, and 39.7% were non-families. 34.4% of all households were made up of individuals, and 16.2% had someone living alone who was 65 years of age or older. The average household size was 2.38 and the average family size was 3.06.

The median age in the city was 35.6 years. 26.7% of residents were under the age of 18; 8% were between the ages of 18 and 24; 26.3% were from 25 to 44; 21.3% were from 45 to 64; and 17.6% were 65 years of age or older. The gender makeup of the city was 47.9% male and 52.1% female.

=== 2000 census ===
As of the census of 2000, there were 2,048 people, 828 households, and 523 families living in the city. The population density was 1,395.1 inhabitants per square mile (538.7/km^{2}). There were 859 housing units at an average density of 585.2 per square mile (225.9/km^{2}). The racial makeup of the city was 95.02% White, 0.24% African American, 0.39% Asian, 3.91% from other races, and 0.44% from two or more races. Hispanic or Latino of any race were 6.05% of the population.

There were 828 households, out of which 31.4% had children under the age of 18 living with them, 51.8% were married couples living together, 7.9% had a female householder with no husband present, and 36.8% were non-families. 33.3% of all households were made up of individuals, and 19.1% had someone living alone who was 65 years of age or older. The average household size was 2.39 and the average family size was 3.06.

In the city, the population was spread out, with 26.6% under the age of 18, 8.4% from 18 to 24, 27.1% from 25 to 44, 18.4% from 45 to 64, and 19.5% who were 65 years of age or older. The median age was 36 years. For every 100 females, there were 88.8 males. For every 100 females age 18 and over, there were 81.3 males.

The median income for a household in the city was $37,632, and the median income for a family was $49,231. Males had a median income of $31,603 versus $20,888 for females. The per capita income for the city was $18,458. About 3.7% of families and 7.5% of the population were below the poverty line, including 5.0% of those under age 18 and 10.1% of those age 65 or over.

== Education ==
Arlington is part of the Sibley East Public Schools district. The local public high school is Sibley East High School.

St. Paul's Lutheran School is a Pre-K-8 grade school of the Wisconsin Evangelical Lutheran Synod in Arlington.

== Infrastructure ==
=== Transportation ===
Minnesota State Highway 5 serves as a main route in the community.

TrailBlazer Transit serves Arlington and the surrounding area.

The Union Pacific (former Minneapolis & St. Louis, later Chicago & North Western) serves Arlington.

== Notable people ==
- John McGovern - Inducted into the College Football Hall of Fame in 1966.
- August B. Mueller- Minnesota state legislator and farmer
- Anne Panning - Co-directs the Brockport Writers Forum.
- Thomas O. Streissguth - Minnesota Supreme Court justice.
