= Dryden Township, Sibley County, Minnesota =

Dryden Township, Minnesota
- Township
- Location within the state of Minnesota Dryden Township, Minnesota (the United States)
- Coordinates: 44°35′56″N 94°12′13″W
- Country: United States
- State: Minnesota
- County: Sibley

Area
  - Total: 34.6 sq mi (89.6 km^{2})
  - Land: 32.9 sq mi (85.2 km^{2})
  - Water: 1.7 sq mi (4.3 km^{2})
- Elevation: 1,001 ft (305 m)

Population (2000)
  - Total: 280
  - Density: 8.5/sq mi (3.3/km^{2})
- Time zone: UTC-6 (Central (CST))
  - Summer (DST): UTC-5 (CDT)
- FIPS code: 27-16426
- GNIS feature ID: 0664002

Dryden Township is a township in Sibley County, Minnesota, United States. The population was 301 at the 2020 census.

== History ==
Dryden Township was originally called Williamstown Township, and under the latter name was organized in 1858. The present name is after John Dryden, an influential English poet, literary critic, translator and playwright.

== Geography ==
According to the United States Census Bureau, the township has a total area of 34.6 square miles (90 km^{2}); 32.9 square miles (85 km^{2}) is land and 1.7 square miles (4.4 km^{2}) (4.86%) is water.

== Demographics ==
At the 2000 census, there were 280 people, 107 households and 86 families residing in the township. The population density was 8.5 per square mile (3.3/km^{2}). There were 109 housing units at an average density of 3.3/sq mi (1.3/km^{2}). The racial makeup of the township was 98.57% White, 1.43% from other races. Hispanic or Latino of any race were 1.43% of the population.

There were 107 households, of which 30.8% had children under the age of 18 living with them, 72.9% were married couples living together, 3.7% had a female householder with no husband present, and 19.6% were non-families. 16.8% of all households were made up of individuals, and 11.2% had someone living alone who was 65 years of age or older. The average household size was 2.62 and the average family size was 2.95.

24.6% of the population were under the age of 18, 6.8% from 18 to 24, 27.5% from 25 to 44, 22.9% from 45 to 64, and 18.2% who were 65 years of age or older. The median age was 40 years. For every 100 females, there were 102.9 males. For every 100 females age 18 and over, there were 102.9 males.

The median household income was $43,750 and the median family income was $47,000. Males had a median income of $22,188 compared with $19,063 for females. The per capita income for the township was $17,527. About 9.2% of families and 11.8% of the population were below the poverty line, including 15.2% of those under the age of eighteen and 6.6% of those 65 or over.
