= Cornish Township, Sibley County, Minnesota =

Cornish Township, Minnesota
- Township
- Location within the state of Minnesota Cornish Township, Minnesota (the United States)
- Coordinates: 44°29′44″N 94°26′1″W
- Country: United States
- State: Minnesota
- County: Sibley

Area
  - Total: 35.5 sq mi (92.0 km^{2})
  - Land: 35.4 sq mi (91.8 km^{2})
  - Water: 0.12 sq mi (0.3 km^{2})
- Elevation: 1,020 ft (310 m)

Population (2000)
  - Total: 267
  - Density: 7.5/sq mi (2.9/km^{2})
- Time zone: UTC-6 (Central (CST))
  - Summer (DST): UTC-5 (CDT)
- FIPS code: 27-13348
- GNIS feature ID: 0663875

Cornish Township is a township in Sibley County, Minnesota, United States. The population was 267 at the 2000 census.

Cornish Township was organized in 1871, and named after Cornish, New Hampshire, the former home of an early settler.

== Geography ==
According to the United States Census Bureau, the township has a total area of 35.5 square miles (92 km^{2}), of which 35.4 square miles (92 km^{2}) is land and 0.1 square miles (0.26 km^{2}) (0.28%) is water.

== Demographics ==
As of the census of 2000, there were 267 people, 105 households, and 85 families residing in the township. The population density was 7.5 inhabitants per square mile (2.9/km^{2}). There were 108 housing units at an average density of 3.0 per square mile (1.2/km^{2}). The racial makeup of the township was 99.25% White, and 0.75% from two or more races.

There were 105 households, out of which 35.2% had children under the age of 18 living with them, 71.4% were married couples living together, 3.8% had a female householder with no husband present, and 19.0% were non-families. 18.1% of all households were made up of individuals, and 9.5% had someone living alone who was 65 years of age or older. The average household size was 2.54 and the average family size was 2.89.

In the township the population was spread out, with 25.1% under the age of 18, 4.5% from 18 to 24, 31.5% from 25 to 44, 22.5% from 45 to 64, and 16.5% who were 65 years of age or older. The median age was 41 years. For every 100 females, there were 115.3 males. For every 100 females age 18 and over, there were 108.3 males.

The median income for a household in the township was $48,036, and the median income for a family was $52,344. Males had a median income of $26,042 versus $25,000 for females. The per capita income for the township was $18,561. About 2.3% of families and 6.0% of the population were below the poverty line, including 7.4% of those under the age of eighteen and 7.5% of those 65 or over.
