= Kelso Township, Sibley County, Minnesota =

Kelso Township, Minnesota
- Township
- Location within the state of Minnesota Kelso Township, Minnesota (the United States)
- Coordinates: 44°29′49″N 94°3′36″W
- Country: United States
- State: Minnesota
- County: Sibley

Area
  - Total: 35.6 sq mi (92.2 km^{2})
  - Land: 35.6 sq mi (92.2 km^{2})
  - Water: 0 sq mi (0.0 km^{2})
- Elevation: 961 ft (293 m)

Population (2000)
  - Total: 357
  - Density: 10/sq mi (3.9/km^{2})
- Time zone: UTC-6 (Central (CST))
  - Summer (DST): UTC-5 (CDT)
- FIPS code: 27-32714
- GNIS feature ID: 0664611

Kelso Township is a township in Sibley County, Minnesota, United States. The population was 357 at the 2000 census.

Kelso Township was organized in 1858, and shares its name with Kelso, in Scotland.

== Geography ==
According to the United States Census Bureau, the township has a total area of 35.6 square miles (92 km^{2}), all land.

== Demographics ==
As of the census of 2000, there were 357 people, 124 households, and 88 families residing in the township. The population density was 10.0 inhabitants per square mile (3.9/km^{2}). There were 128 housing units at an average density of 3.6 per square mile (1.4/km^{2}). The racial makeup of the township was 96.08% White, 0.84% Asian, 2.80% from other races, and 0.28% from two or more races. Hispanic or Latino of any race were 2.24% of the population.

There were 124 households, out of which 34.7% had children under the age of 18 living with them, 65.3% were married couples living together, 3.2% had a female householder with no husband present, and 29.0% were non-families. 26.6% of all households were made up of individuals, and 8.1% had someone living alone who was 65 years of age or older. The average household size was 2.88 and the average family size was 3.56.

In the township the population was spread out, with 30.0% under the age of 18, 8.7% from 18 to 24, 25.5% from 25 to 44, 25.8% from 45 to 64, and 10.1% who were 65 years of age or older. The median age was 36 years. For every 100 females, there were 128.8 males. For every 100 females age 18 and over, there were 121.2 males.

The median income for a household in the township was $46,250, and the median income for a family was $52,000. Males had a median income of $31,518 versus $22,708 for females. The per capita income for the township was $17,818. About 2.1% of families and 6.6% of the population were below the poverty line, including 7.8% of those under age 18 and 17.6% of those age 65 or over.
