= Gaylord, Minnesota =

City in Minnesota, United States

- City
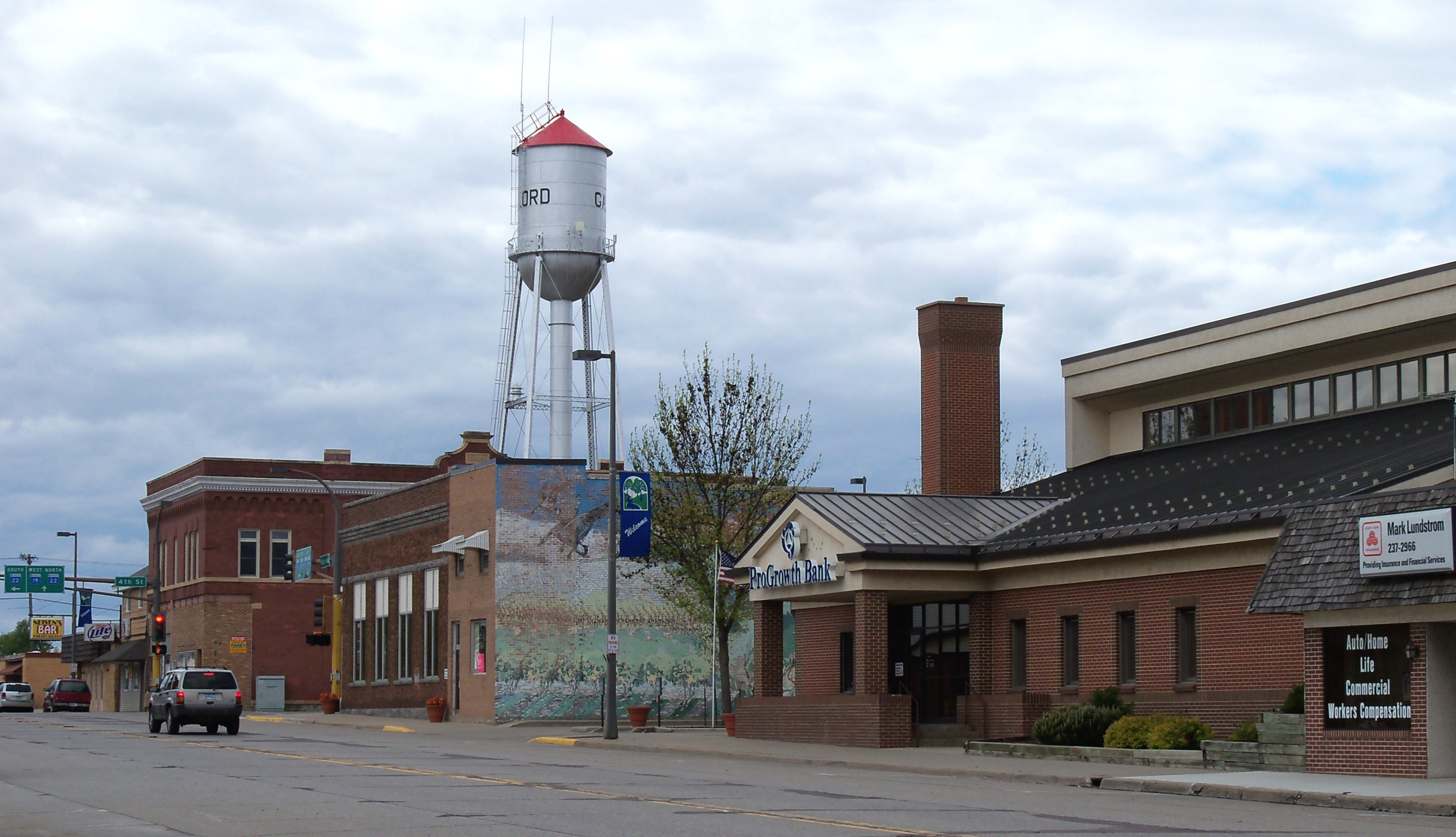
- Motto: "The Hub Of Sibley County"
- Location of Gaylord within Sibley County and state of Minnesota
- Coordinates: 44°33′21″N 94°12′48″W
- Country: United States
- State: Minnesota
- County: Sibley

Government
  - Type: Mayor – Council
  - Mayor: Dawn Kratzke Muchow

Area
  - Total: 1.86 sq mi (4.82 km^{2})
  - Land: 1.86 sq mi (4.82 km^{2})
  - Water: 0 sq mi (0.00 km^{2})
- Elevation: 988 ft (301 m)

Population (2020)
  - Total: 2,273
  - Density: 1,221.8/sq mi (471.73/km^{2})
- Time zone: UTC-6 (Central (CST))
  - Summer (DST): UTC-5 (CDT)
- ZIP code: 55334
- Area code: 507
- FIPS code: 27-23300
- GNIS feature ID: 2394868
- Website: Exploregaylord.org

Gaylord (/ˈɡeɪlərd/ GAY-lərd) is a city and the county seat of Sibley County, Minnesota, United States, along the shore of Titlow Lake. It is about 65 miles (105 km) west-southwest of Minneapolis-St. Paul. The population was 2,273 at the 2020 census.

== History ==
A commonly used trail to the Dakota Territory passed through the future site of Gaylord in the 1850s.

Gaylord was platted in 1881, and named for Edward W. Gaylord, a railroad official. A post office has been in operation at Gaylord since 1881.

Gaylord's current mayor is Dawn Kratzke, while its Council President is Chad Muchow. The City Council meets on the first and third Wednesdays of each month at 6:30 p.m. at Gaylord City Hall (332 Main Avenue, Gaylord).

== Geography ==
According to the United States Census Bureau, the city has an area of 1.67 square miles (4.33 km^{2}), all land. Minnesota State Highways 5, 19, and 22 are three of the main routes through the community.

=== Climate ===
Climate data for Gaylord, Minnesota, 1991–2020 normals, extremes 1956–present
Month	Jan	Feb	Mar	Apr	May	Jun	Jul	Aug	Sep	Oct	Nov	Dec	Year
Record high °F (°C)	53 (12)	63 (17)	84 (29)	93 (34)	99 (37)	103 (39)	105 (41)	104 (40)	98 (37)	89 (32)	78 (26)	65 (18)	105 (41)
Mean maximum °F (°C)	39.2 (4.0)	44.3 (6.8)	62.4 (16.9)	79.1 (26.2)	89.1 (31.7)	93.4 (34.1)	94.0 (34.4)	91.4 (33.0)	88.5 (31.4)	80.2 (26.8)	61.2 (16.2)	44.9 (7.2)	96.2 (35.7)
Mean daily maximum °F (°C)	21.2 (−6.0)	25.6 (−3.6)	38.4 (3.6)	54.4 (12.4)	68.2 (20.1)	78.4 (25.8)	82.4 (28.0)	79.8 (26.6)	72.3 (22.4)	57.3 (14.1)	40.7 (4.8)	27.0 (−2.8)	53.8 (12.1)
Daily mean °F (°C)	13.6 (−10.2)	17.5 (−8.1)	30.3 (−0.9)	44.9 (7.2)	58.3 (14.6)	68.9 (20.5)	72.7 (22.6)	70.1 (21.2)	61.9 (16.6)	47.9 (8.8)	32.9 (0.5)	19.7 (−6.8)	44.9 (7.2)
Mean daily minimum °F (°C)	6.0 (−14.4)	9.4 (−12.6)	22.3 (−5.4)	35.4 (1.9)	48.4 (9.1)	59.4 (15.2)	63.0 (17.2)	60.4 (15.8)	51.4 (10.8)	38.4 (3.6)	25.1 (−3.8)	12.5 (−10.8)	36.0 (2.2)
Mean minimum °F (°C)	−17.0 (−27.2)	−11.5 (−24.2)	−1.3 (−18.5)	20.5 (−6.4)	34.3 (1.3)	47.1 (8.4)	53.1 (11.7)	49.8 (9.9)	36.5 (2.5)	22.7 (−5.2)	6.0 (−14.4)	−9.3 (−22.9)	−19.6 (−28.7)
Record low °F (°C)	−32 (−36)	−34 (−37)	−25 (−32)	2 (−17)	21 (−6)	38 (3)	44 (7)	39 (4)	23 (−5)	11 (−12)	−16 (−27)	−34 (−37)	−34 (−37)
Average precipitation inches (mm)	0.85 (22)	0.85 (22)	1.78 (45)	3.00 (76)	3.54 (90)	4.93 (125)	3.61 (92)	4.61 (117)	3.23 (82)	2.11 (54)	1.65 (42)	1.35 (34)	31.51 (801)
Average snowfall inches (cm)	7.8 (20)	5.7 (14)	9.3 (24)	1.4 (3.6)	0.0 (0.0)	0.0 (0.0)	0.0 (0.0)	0.0 (0.0)	0.0 (0.0)	0.1 (0.25)	5.4 (14)	8.9 (23)	38.6 (98.85)
Average precipitation days (≥ 0.01 in)	2.9	2.3	3.7	6.3	8.8	8.9	6.9	7.6	6.7	5.2	3.4	2.6	65.3
Average snowy days (≥ 0.1 in)	3.8	2.7	2.5	0.6	0.0	0.0	0.0	0.0	0.0	0.0	1.4	3.4	14.4
Source 1: NOAA (precip/precip days, snow/snow days 1981–2010)
Source 2: National Weather Service

== Demographics ==
Historical population
Census	Pop.	Note	%±
1890	387		—
1900	608		57.1%
1910	610		0.3%
1920	783		28.4%
1930	812		3.7%
1940	1,049		29.2%
1950	1,229		17.2%
1960	1,631		32.7%
1970	1,720		5.5%
1980	1,933		12.4%
1990	1,935		0.1%
2000	2,279		17.8%
2010	2,305		1.1%
2020	2,273		−1.4%
U.S. Decennial Census

=== 2020 census ===
As of the 2020 census, Gaylord had a population of 2,273. The median age was 41.1 years. 22.6% of residents were under the age of 18 and 22.3% of residents were 65 years of age or older. For every 100 females there were 97.1 males, and for every 100 females age 18 and over there were 93.4 males age 18 and over.

0.0% of residents lived in urban areas, while 100.0% lived in rural areas.

There were 935 households in Gaylord, of which 28.8% had children under the age of 18 living in them. Of all households, 42.8% were married-couple households, 23.3% were households with a male householder and no spouse or partner present, and 27.3% were households with a female householder and no spouse or partner present. About 34.9% of all households were made up of individuals and 15.2% had someone living alone who was 65 years of age or older.

There were 984 housing units, of which 5.0% were vacant. The homeowner vacancy rate was 1.0% and the rental vacancy rate was 6.2%.

Racial composition as of the 2020 census
Race	Number	Percent
White	1,769	77.8%
Black or African American	17	0.7%
American Indian and Alaska Native	5	0.2%
Asian	17	0.7%
Native Hawaiian and Other Pacific Islander	1	0.0%
Some other race	247	10.9%
Two or more races	217	9.5%
Hispanic or Latino (of any race)	569	25.0%

=== 2010 census ===
As of the census of 2010, there were 2,305 people, 929 households, and 590 families living in the city. The population density was 1,380.2 inhabitants per square mile (532.9/km^{2}). There were 996 housing units at an average density of 596.4 per square mile (230.3/km^{2}). The racial makeup of the city was 87.6% White, 0.2% African American, 0.1% Native American, 1.2% Asian, 9.6% from other races, and 1.2% from two or more races. Hispanic or Latino of any race were 23.0% of the population.

There were 929 households, of which 31.5% had children under the age of 18 living with them, 48.2% were married couples living together, 10.1% had a female householder with no husband present, 5.2% had a male householder with no wife present, and 36.5% were non-families. 32.6% of all households were made up of individuals, and 16.7% had someone living alone who was 65 years of age or older. The average household size was 2.42 and the average family size was 3.05.

The median age in the city was 37.3 years. 27% of residents were under the age of 18; 8.2% were between the ages of 18 and 24; 23.6% were from 25 to 44; 22.6% were from 45 to 64; and 18.5% were 65 years of age or older. The gender makeup of the city was 49.2% male and 50.8% female.

=== 2000 census ===
As of the census of 2000, there were 2,279 people, 897 households, and 592 families living in the city. The population density was 1,435.3 inhabitants per square mile (554.2/km^{2}). There were 930 housing units at an average density of 585.7 per square mile (226.1/km^{2}). The racial makeup of the city was 88.02% White, 0.18% African American, 0.61% Native American, 0.70% Asian, 9.78% from other races, and 0.70% from two or more races. Hispanic or Latino of any race were 17.38% of the population.

There were 897 households, out of which 29.9% had children under the age of 18 living with them, 54.0% were married couples living together, 8.7% had a female householder with no husband present, and 33.9% were non-families. 29.1% of all households were made up of individuals, and 16.5% had someone living alone who was 65 years of age or older. The average household size was 2.45 and the average family size was 3.01.

In the city, the population was spread out, with 24.7% under the age of 18, 8.4% from 18 to 24, 24.6% from 25 to 44, 21.2% from 45 to 64, and 21.0% who were 65 years of age or older. The median age was 38 years. For every 100 females, there were 97.1 males. For every 100 females age 18 and over, there were 86.8 males.

The median income for a household in the city was $39,053, and the median income for a family was $45,750. Males had a median income of $29,167 versus $22,406 for females. The per capita income for the city was $17,048. About 9.4% of families and 13.6% of the population were below the poverty line, including 21.5% of those under age 18 and 8.5% of those age 65 or over.

== Employment ==
Michael Foods is Gaylord's largest employer, situated at the confluence of Highways 5 and 19 on the east edge of the town. The second-largest is Sibley County, of which Gaylord is the county seat.

== Education ==
Green Isle is in the Sibley East School District. The district's comprehensive high school is Sibley East High School.
