= Arlington Township, Sibley County, Minnesota =

Arlington Township, Minnesota
- Township
- Location within the state of Minnesota Arlington Township, Minnesota (the United States)
- Coordinates: 44°35′15″N 94°4′17″W
- Country: United States
- State: Minnesota
- County: Sibley

Area
  - Total: 34.7 sq mi (89.8 km^{2})
  - Land: 34.7 sq mi (89.8 km^{2})
  - Water: 0 sq mi (0.0 km^{2})
- Elevation: 981 ft (299 m)

Population (2020)
  - Total: 475
  - Density: 14/sq mi (5.3/km^{2})
- Time zone: UTC-6 (Central (CST))
  - Summer (DST): UTC-5 (CDT)
- ZIP code: 55307
- Area code: 507
- FIPS code: 27-02170
- GNIS feature ID: 0663457

Arlington Township is a township in Sibley County, Minnesota, United States. The population was 475 at the 2020 census.

== History ==
Arlington Township was organized in 1858.

== Geography ==
According to the United States Census Bureau, the township has a total area of 34.7 square miles (90 km^{2}), all land.

== Demographics ==
As of the census of 2020, there were 475 people, 183 households, and 135 families residing in the township. The population density was 13.7 inhabitants per square mile (5.3/km^{2}). There were 199 housing units at an average density of 5.7 per square mile (2.2/km^{2}). The racial makeup of the township was 96.8% White, with 460 of 475 residents identifying as White alone.

There were 183 households, out of which 30% had children under the age of 18 living with them, 71.5% were married couples living together, 0.5% had a female householder with no husband present, and 20% were non-families. 20.8% of all households were made up of individuals, and 13.1% had someone living alone who was 65 years of age or older. The average household size was 2.35 and the average family size was 2.76.

In the township, the population is aging, with 13.3% under the age of 18, 9.5% from 18 to 24, 15% from 25 to 44, 40.3% from 45 to 64, and 22% who were 65 years of age or older. The median age was 54.5 years. For every 100 females, there were 104.8 males.

The median income for a household in the township was $95,625, and the median income for a family was $114.583. Males had a median income of $63,250 versus $43,750 for females. About 1.5% of families and 6.3% of the population were below the poverty line, including 5.3% of those age 65 or over.
