= Sibley County, Minnesota =

County in Minnesota, United States

- County
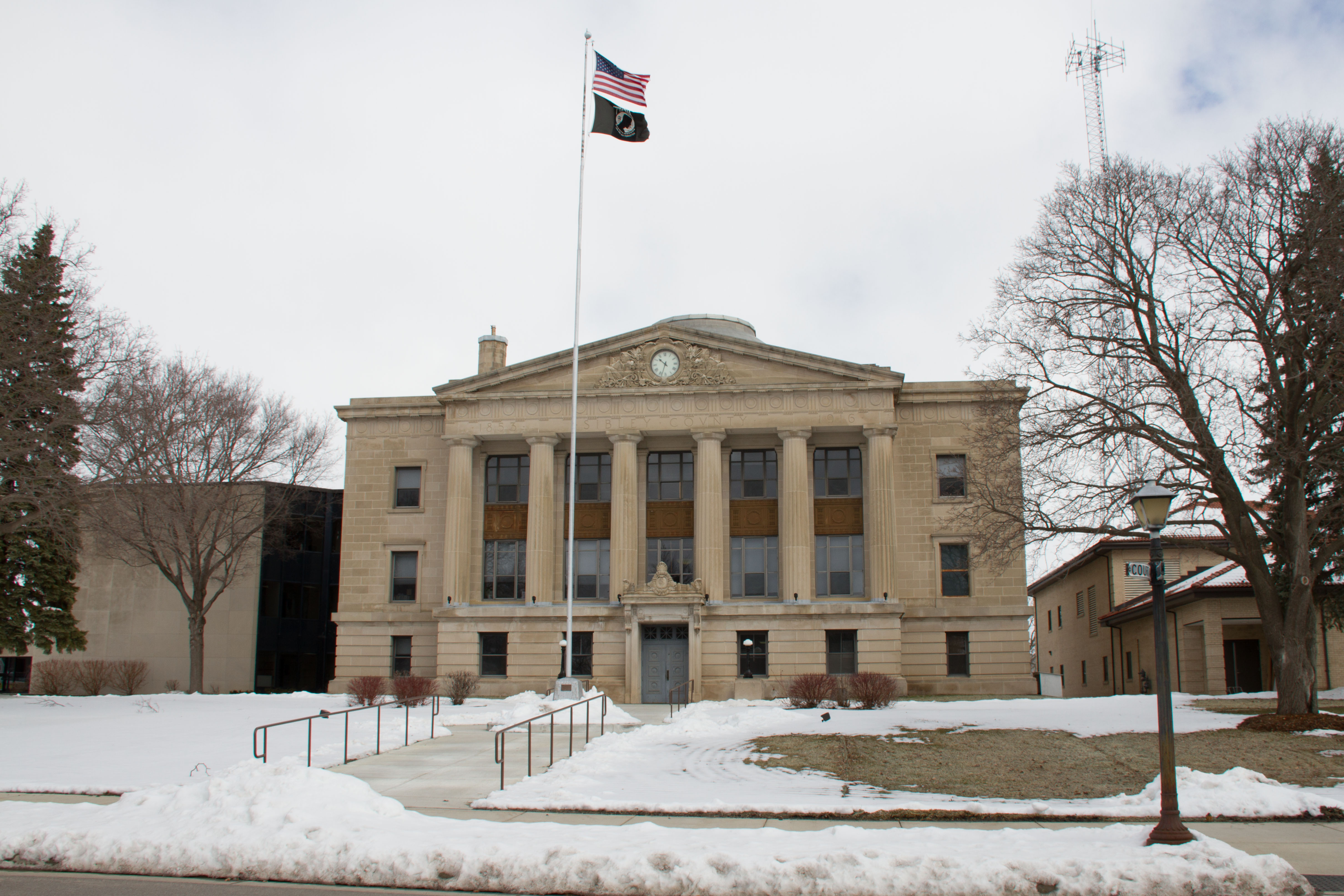
- Sibley County Courthouse

- Location within the U.S. state of Minnesota
- Coordinates: 44°35′N 94°14′W
- Country: United States
- State: Minnesota
- Founded: March 5, 1853
- Named for: Henry Hastings Sibley
- Seat: Gaylord
- Largest city: Gaylord

Area
  - Total: 601 sq mi (1,560 km^{2})
  - Land: 589 sq mi (1,530 km^{2})
  - Water: 12 sq mi (31 km^{2}) 2.0%

Population (2020)
  - Total: 14,836
  - Estimate (2025): 15,356 ▲
  - Density: 26.1/sq mi (10.1/km^{2})
- Time zone: UTC−6 (Central)
  - Summer (DST): UTC−5 (CDT)
- Congressional district: 7th
- Website: www.sibleycounty.gov

Sibley County is a county in the South Central part of the U.S. state of Minnesota. As of the 2020 census, the population was 14,836. Its county seat is Gaylord.

== History ==
The county was created on March 5, 1853. It was named for Henry Hastings Sibley.

The county seat was first established at Henderson. A courthouse was built there and placed into service in 1879. It was used in that capacity until 1915, when the county seat was moved to Gaylord (after Gaylord residents presented a petition to county supervisors). Now the Henderson Community Building, the original courthouse presently houses Henderson City offices.

== Geography ==
The Minnesota River flows northeastward along Sibley County's eastern border. It is fed by the Rush River, whose three branches drain the lower part of the county before merging and then meeting the Minnesota below Henderson. Bevens Creek drains the upper part of the county, flowing northeastward into Carver County. The county terrain consists of rolling hills etched with drainages and dotted with lakes and ponds, with the area devoted to agriculture. The terrain slopes to the east and north, with its highest point near its northwest corner at 1,083 ft (330 m) ASL. The county has an area of 601 square miles (1,560 km^{2}), of which 589 square miles (1,530 km^{2}) is land and 12 square miles (31 km^{2}) (2.0%) is water. Most of the Rush River's watershed is in Sibley County.

Soils of Sibley County

=== Major highways ===
- U.S. Highway 169
- Minnesota State Highway 5
- Minnesota State Highway 15
- Minnesota State Highway 19
- Minnesota State Highway 22
- Minnesota State Highway 25
- Minnesota State Highway 93

=== Adjacent counties ===
- McLeod County - north
- Carver County - northeast
- Scott County - east
- Le Sueur County - southeast
- Nicollet County - south
- Renville County - west

=== Lakes ===
- Altnow Lake: in Dryden Township
- Beatty Lake: in Dryden Township
- Clear Lake: northern half is in Severance Township; southern half is in Nicollet County
- Curran Lake: in Green Isle Township
- Erin Lake
- Hahn Lake: in New Auburn Township
- High Island Lake: in New Auburn Township
- Indian Lake: in Transit Township
- Kerry Lake: in Faxon Township
- Kirby Lake
- Mud Lake: in Dryden Township
- Mud Lake: there is another Mud Lake in New Auburn Township northwest of Hahn Lake
- Mud Lake: there is a third Mud Lake in New Auburn Township southeast of Hahn Lake
- Mud Lake: there is a fourth Mud Lake in Severance Township
- Mud Lakes: three lakes in Washington Lake Township
- Round Grove Lake
- Sand Lake: western two thirds is in Cornish Township; the eastern third is in Alfsborg Township
- Schauer Lake: in Green Isle Township
- Schilling Lake: in New Auburn Township
- Severance Lake: in Green Isle Township
- Silver Lake: in Jessenland Township
- Swan Lake: in Severance Township
- Titlow Lake: in Dryden Township: the North Branch Rush River starts at this lake.
- Ward Lake (part)
- Washington Lake: in Washington Lake Township

=== Protected areas ===
- Altnow Marsh State Wildlife Management Area
- Indian Lake State Wildlife Management Area
- Minnesota Valley National Wildlife Refuge (part)
- Revanche Wildlife Management Area
- Rush River County Park

== Demographics ==
Historical population
Census	Pop.	Note	%±
1860	3,609		—
1870	6,725		86.3%
1880	10,637		58.2%
1890	15,199		42.9%
1900	16,862		10.9%
1910	15,540		−7.8%
1920	15,635		0.6%
1930	15,865		1.5%
1940	16,625		4.8%
1950	15,816		−4.9%
1960	16,228		2.6%
1970	15,845		−2.4%
1980	15,448		−2.5%
1990	14,366		−7.0%
2000	15,356		6.9%
2010	15,226		−0.8%
2020	14,836		−2.6%
2025 (est.)	15,356	▲	3.5%
U.S. Decennial Census:

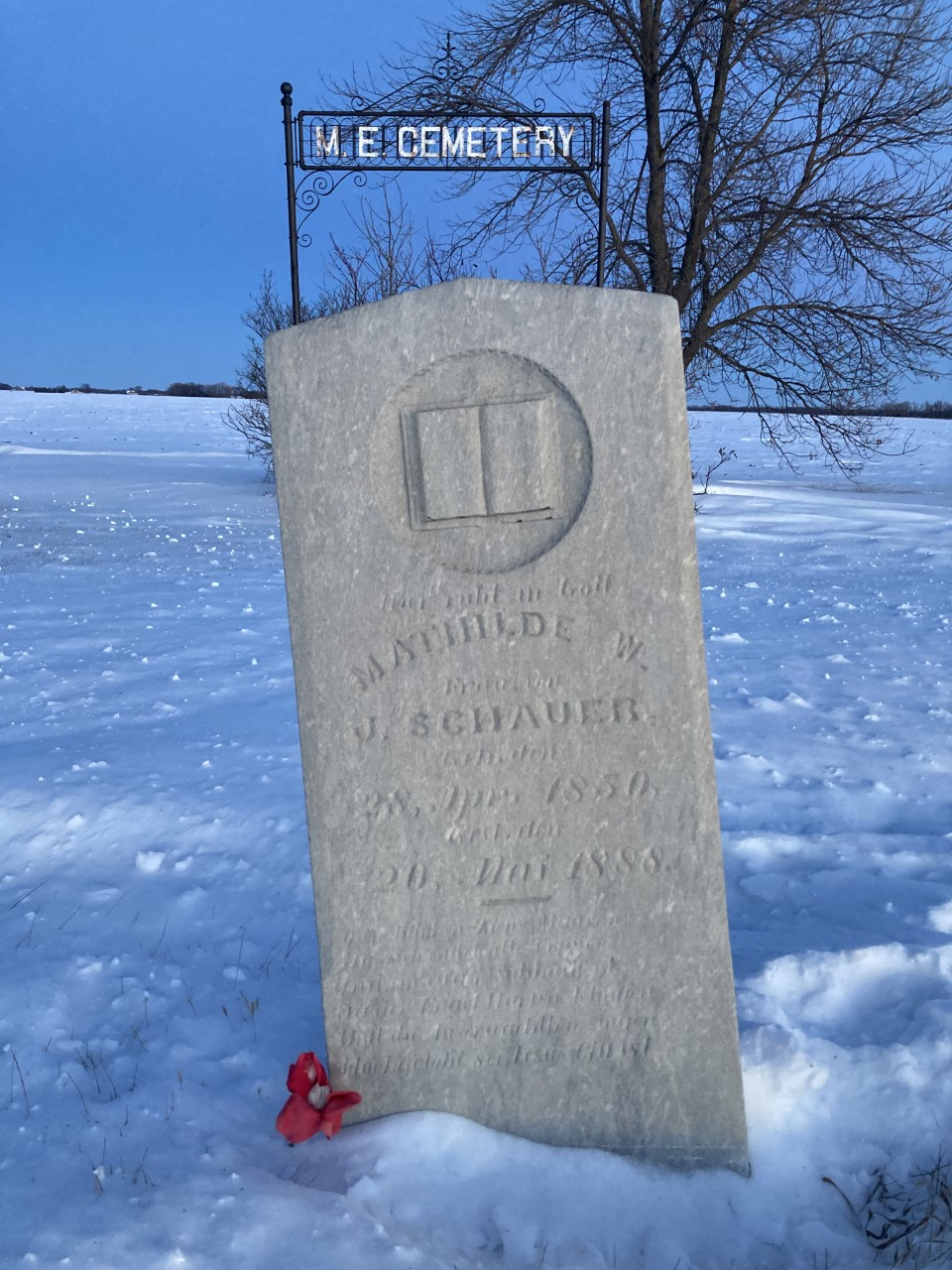
German graves in ME Cemetery, evidence of German settlers

=== Racial and ethnic composition ===
Sibley County, Minnesota – Racial and ethnic composition Note: the US Census treats Hispanic/Latino as an ethnic category. This table excludes Latinos from the racial categories and assigns them to a separate category. Hispanics/Latinos may be of any race.
Race / Ethnicity (NH = Non-Hispanic)	Pop 1980	Pop 1990	Pop 2000	Pop 2010	Pop 2020	% 1980	% 1990	% 2000	% 2010	% 2020
White alone (NH)	15,304	14,187	14,337	13,835	12,942	99.07%	98.75%	93.36%	90.86%	87.23%
Black or African American alone (NH)	3	5	15	41	81	0.02%	0.03%	0.10%	0.27%	0.55%
Native American or Alaska Native alone (NH)	22	15	33	22	30	0.14%	0.10%	0.21%	0.14%	0.20%
Asian alone (NH)	25	32	50	80	72	0.16%	0.22%	0.33%	0.53%	0.49%
Native Hawaiian or Pacific Islander alone (NH)	x	x	0	2	10	x	x	0.00%	0.01%	0.07%
Other race alone (NH)	5	0	14	10	25	0.03%	0.00%	0.09%	0.07%	0.17%
Mixed race or Multiracial (NH)	x	x	73	138	361	x	x	0.48%	0.91%	2.43%
Hispanic or Latino (any race)	89	127	834	1,098	1,315	0.58%	0.88%	5.43%	7.21%	8.86%
Total	15,448	14,366	15,356	15,226	14,836	100.00%	100.00%	100.00%	100.00%	100.00%

=== 2020 census ===
As of the 2020 census, the county had a population of 14,836. The median age was 42.3 years. 23.1% of residents were under the age of 18 and 19.1% of residents were 65 years of age or older. For every 100 females there were 103.1 males, and for every 100 females age 18 and over there were 102.1 males age 18 and over.

The racial makeup of the county was 89.7% White, 0.6% Black or African American, 0.3% American Indian and Alaska Native, 0.5% Asian, 0.1% Native Hawaiian and Pacific Islander, 3.7% from some other race, and 5.1% from two or more races. Hispanic or Latino residents of any race comprised 8.9% of the population.

<0.1% of residents lived in urban areas, while 100.0% lived in rural areas.

There were 5,989 households in the county, of which 28.2% had children under the age of 18 living in them. Of all households, 53.5% were married-couple households, 19.9% were households with a male householder and no spouse or partner present, and 19.4% were households with a female householder and no spouse or partner present. About 28.3% of all households were made up of individuals and 13.0% had someone living alone who was 65 years of age or older.

There were 6,454 housing units, of which 7.2% were vacant. Among occupied housing units, 79.7% were owner-occupied and 20.3% were renter-occupied. The homeowner vacancy rate was 1.3% and the rental vacancy rate was 5.6%.

=== 2000 census ===
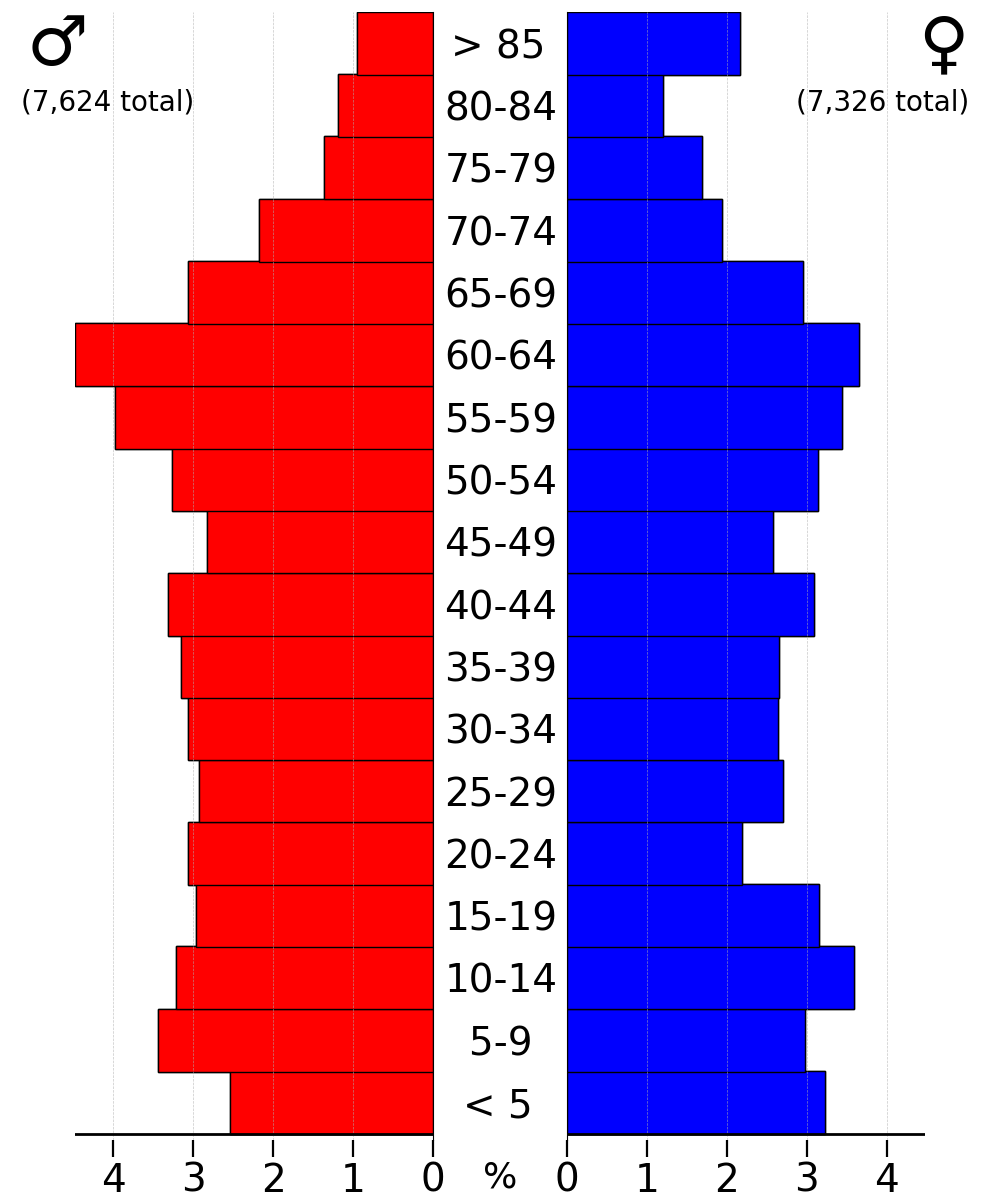
2022 US Census population pyramid for Sibley County, from ACS 5-year estimates

As of the census of 2000, there were 15,356 people, 5,772 households, and 4,086 families in the county. The population density was 26.1 per square mile (10.1/km^{2}). There were 6,024 housing units at an average density of 10.2 per square mile (3.9/km^{2}). The racial makeup of the county was 95.57% White, 0.12% Black or African American, 0.26% Native American, 0.33% Asian, 3.09% from other races, and 0.62% from two or more races. 5.43% of the population were Hispanic or Latino of any race. 65.7% were of German and 6.3% Norwegian ancestry.

There were 5,772 households, of which 33.6% had children under 18 living with them, 61.1% were married couples living together, 5.8% had a female householder with no husband present, and 29.2% were non-families. 25.4% of all households were made up of individuals, and 13.0% had someone living alone who was 65 or older. The average household size was 2.60 and the average family size was 3.14.

The county population was 27.7% under 18, 7.5% from 18 to 24, 27.1% from 25 to 44, 21.3% from 45 to 64, and 16.4% 65 or older. The median age was 37. For every 100 females there were 102.9 males. For every 100 females 18 and over, there were 99.9 males.

The median income for a household in the county was $41,458, and the median income for a family was $48,923. Males had a median income of $31,002 versus $22,527 for females. The per capita income was $18,004. About 5.1% of families and 8.1% of the population were below the poverty line, including 9.8% of those under 18 and 7.8% of those 65 or over.

== Communities ==
=== Cities ===
- Arlington
- Gaylord (county seat)
- Gibbon
- Green Isle
- Henderson
- Le Sueur (mostly in Le Sueur County)
- New Auburn
- Winthrop

=== Unincorporated communities ===
- Assumption (partial)
- New Rome
- Rush River

=== Townships ===
- Alfsborg Township
- Arlington Township
- Bismarck Township
- Cornish Township
- Dryden Township
- Faxon Township
- Grafton Township
- Green Isle Township
- Henderson Township
- Jessenland Township
- Kelso Township
- Moltke Township
- New Auburn Township
- Severance Township
- Sibley Township
- Transit Township
- Washington Lake Township

== Politics ==
Historically, during the Third Party System, Sibley was a strongly Democratic county due to its German and Irish Catholic populace's opposition to the Republican Party's pietism. It voted Democratic in every presidential election until William Jennings Bryan's populist-backed Free Silver campaign drove its voters to William McKinley. Except when voting for Robert La Follette in 1924 and Franklin D. Roosevelt during his two 1930s landslides, Sibley County has been firmly Republican since 1896. It was one of only four Minnesota counties to vote for Barry Goldwater over incumbent Democratic President Lyndon Johnson in 1964, and in no presidential election since 1936 has the Democratic nominee won a majority. In 1992, Sibley was Ross Perot's strongest county in Minnesota, losing by only 14 votes to Bill Clinton, whose pluralities in this and the 1996 election are the only Democratic victories in Sibley County since 1940.

United States presidential election results for Sibley County, Minnesota
Year	Republican		Democratic		Third party(ies)	
Year	No.	%	No.	%	No.	%
1892	950	37.79%	1,191	47.37%	373	14.84%
1896	1,826	57.97%	1,251	39.71%	73	2.32%
1900	1,736	56.24%	1,272	41.21%	79	2.56%
1904	1,628	69.22%	662	28.15%	62	2.64%
1908	1,623	57.92%	1,110	39.61%	69	2.46%
1912	383	15.14%	890	35.19%	1,256	49.66%
1916	1,737	62.37%	973	34.94%	75	2.69%
1920	4,198	85.94%	502	10.28%	185	3.79%
1924	1,749	34.57%	341	6.74%	2,970	58.70%
1928	3,301	55.94%	2,553	43.26%	47	0.80%
1932	1,398	22.42%	4,756	76.27%	82	1.31%
1936	2,184	32.43%	4,140	61.47%	411	6.10%
1940	5,564	73.32%	1,986	26.17%	39	0.51%
1944	4,311	71.56%	1,683	27.94%	30	0.50%
1948	3,260	52.95%	2,818	45.77%	79	1.28%
1952	5,323	73.79%	1,871	25.94%	20	0.28%
1956	4,737	69.23%	2,099	30.68%	6	0.09%
1960	4,987	66.12%	2,541	33.69%	14	0.19%
1964	3,854	51.83%	3,577	48.10%	5	0.07%
1968	4,250	59.41%	2,540	35.50%	364	5.09%
1972	4,543	64.17%	2,433	34.36%	104	1.47%
1976	3,871	49.25%	3,752	47.74%	237	3.02%
1980	4,460	58.36%	2,521	32.99%	661	8.65%
1984	4,638	62.10%	2,761	36.97%	69	0.92%
1988	3,655	52.67%	3,154	45.45%	130	1.87%
1992	2,315	32.22%	2,421	33.70%	2,449	34.08%
1996	2,590	38.96%	2,769	41.66%	1,288	19.38%
2000	4,087	55.72%	2,687	36.63%	561	7.65%
2004	4,669	58.74%	3,109	39.11%	171	2.15%
2008	4,492	58.12%	2,998	38.79%	239	3.09%
2012	4,693	60.05%	2,916	37.31%	206	2.64%
2016	5,193	66.80%	1,954	25.14%	627	8.07%
2020	5,864	69.38%	2,417	28.60%	171	2.02%
2024	6,014	70.45%	2,351	27.54%	172	2.01%

== Education ==
School districts include:

- Belle Plaine Public School District
- Buffalo Lake-Hector-Stewart Public Schools
- Central Public School District
- Glencoe-Silver Lake School District
- GFW Schools
- Le Sueur-Henderson School District
- Sibley East School District

== See also ==
- National Register of Historic Places listings in Sibley County, Minnesota
