= Political violence in the United States =

In the context of the history of the United States, political violence is defined as violence which the state or a non-state actor perpetrates in order to achieve political goals. Political violence has occurred throughout American history—from the assassinations of four presidents to civil unrest and terrorist attacks. Experts report that incidents have increased significantly since 2016, reaching levels not seen since the 1970s. 21st-century data indicates that the highest incidence of deadly political violence in the United States has come from right-wing extremists, with left-wing extremists and Islamists being the other main ideological categories. Contributing factors toward political violence include dehumanizing political rhetoric and partisan division, authoritarian personality traits, hostile sexist beliefs, online radicalization, and a sense of threat or increased fear.

Although widely discussed, realized acts of political violence in the United States are rare and constitute about 1% of all hate crimes.

== Definition ==
Reuters defined political violence thusly: "Incidents linked to an election or a partisan political dispute, or premeditated acts driven by an identifiable ideology. Random hate crimes and violence involving police such as officer-involved killings or aggressive crowd-control tactics at protests were not included." The violence-prevention organization Over Zero defines it thusly: "Physical harm or intimidation that affects who benefits from or can participate fully in political, economic, or sociocultural life."

== Chronology ==
=== 18th century ===
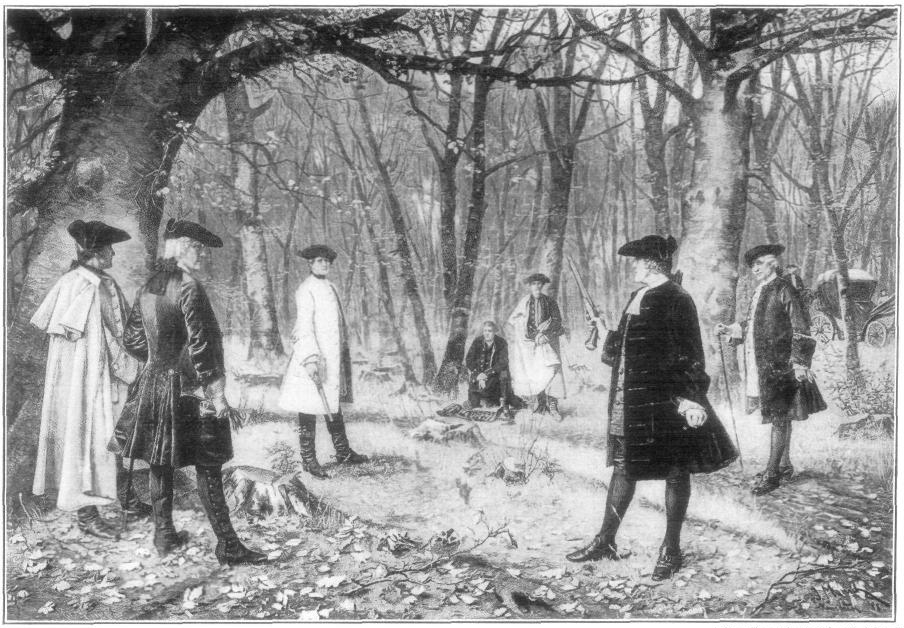
A 1902 illustration of the Burr–Hamilton duel

Politically motivated violence was common during the American Revolution. In the late 1760s, Sons of Liberty militants would often attack suspected British loyalists, tarring and feathering them, a practice brought from Europe which resulted in lacerations and scarring. Hangings, raids, and executions became more frequent in the 1770s.

Henry Brockholst Livingston, who had survived an assassination attempt in 1785, killed a man in a 1798 gun duel. Livingston's reputation was unharmed by the incident and he later became a Supreme Court justice. Another duel took place between former Georgia governor and Declaration of Independence signatory Button Gwinnett and his opponent Lachlan McIntosh in 1777; Gwinnett died after the shooting. A number of other pistol duels took place in the 18th century.

=== 19th century ===
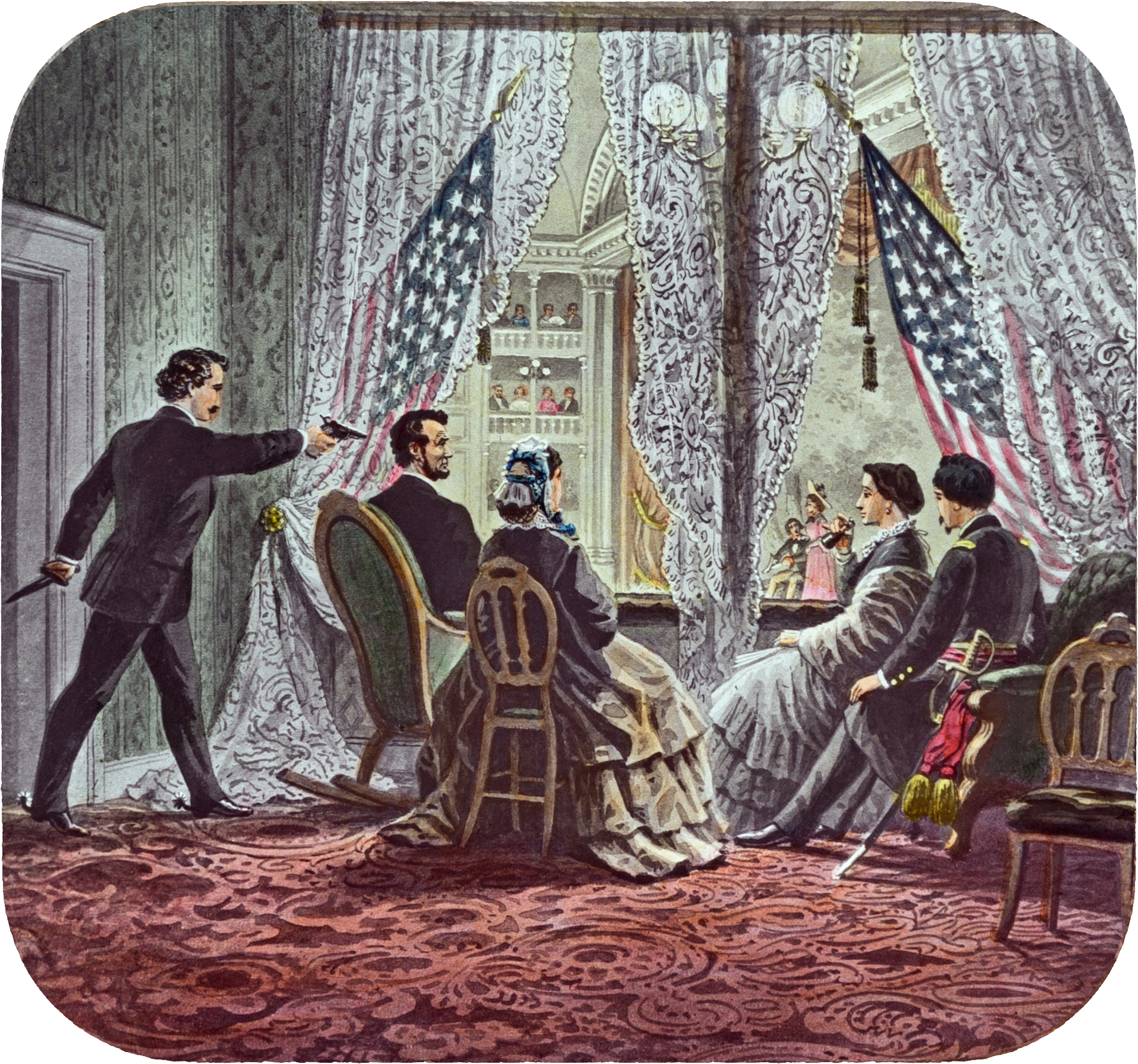
A depiction of Lincoln's assassination

Violence continued after the Revolution. In 1804, vice president Aaron Burr killed Founding Father Alexander Hamilton in a gun duel. The Know Nothing party was responsible for a number of attacks against Catholics and immigrants in the early 1800s. In 1844, Joseph Smith, the founder of Mormonism and the Latter-Day Saint movement, announced his candidacy for the presidency of the United States. He became the first assassinated presidential candidate in U.S. history when he was shot and killed by a mob on June 27.

The topic of slavery also ignited several episodes of violence near Kansas during the 1850s. The lead-up to the American Civil War saw regional violence like the conflict over the expansion of slavery known as Bleeding Kansas and local protests against the Fugitive Slave Law including the Christiana Riot and the assemblies organized by the Boston Vigilance Committee, as well as incidents at the U.S. Capitol such as the caning of Charles Sumner and the 1858 Congressional brawl.

In 1856, abolitionist John Brown with like-minded settlers killed five pro-slavery settlers north of Pottawatomie Creek in Franklin County, Kansas. In 1859, Brown led a raid on the United States arsenal at Harpers Ferry, Virginia in an effort to initiate a slave revolt in Southern states. It has been called the "dress rehearsal" for the American Civil War.

President Abraham Lincoln was assassinated in 1865, and he had suffered two assassination attempts before that. The first president to be assassinated, Lincoln was shot by John Wilkes Booth while watching a theatre production. One motive attributed to his killing was his support for Black rights. The Reconstruction era was also a period of considerable violence, including multiple Freedmen massacres and assassinations of federal appointees and locally elected officials. In 1881, president James A. Garfield was killed six months after taking office.

=== 20th century ===
==== 1900–1920 ====
President William McKinley was assassinated in 1901 by anarchist activist Leon Czolgosz, who was opposed to "the Republican form of government". Eleven years later, former president Theodore Roosevelt survived a gunshot in 1912 while campaigning to return to office. President-elect Franklin D. Roosevelt survived a shooting during a rally in 1933, but Chicago mayor Anton Cermak was killed.

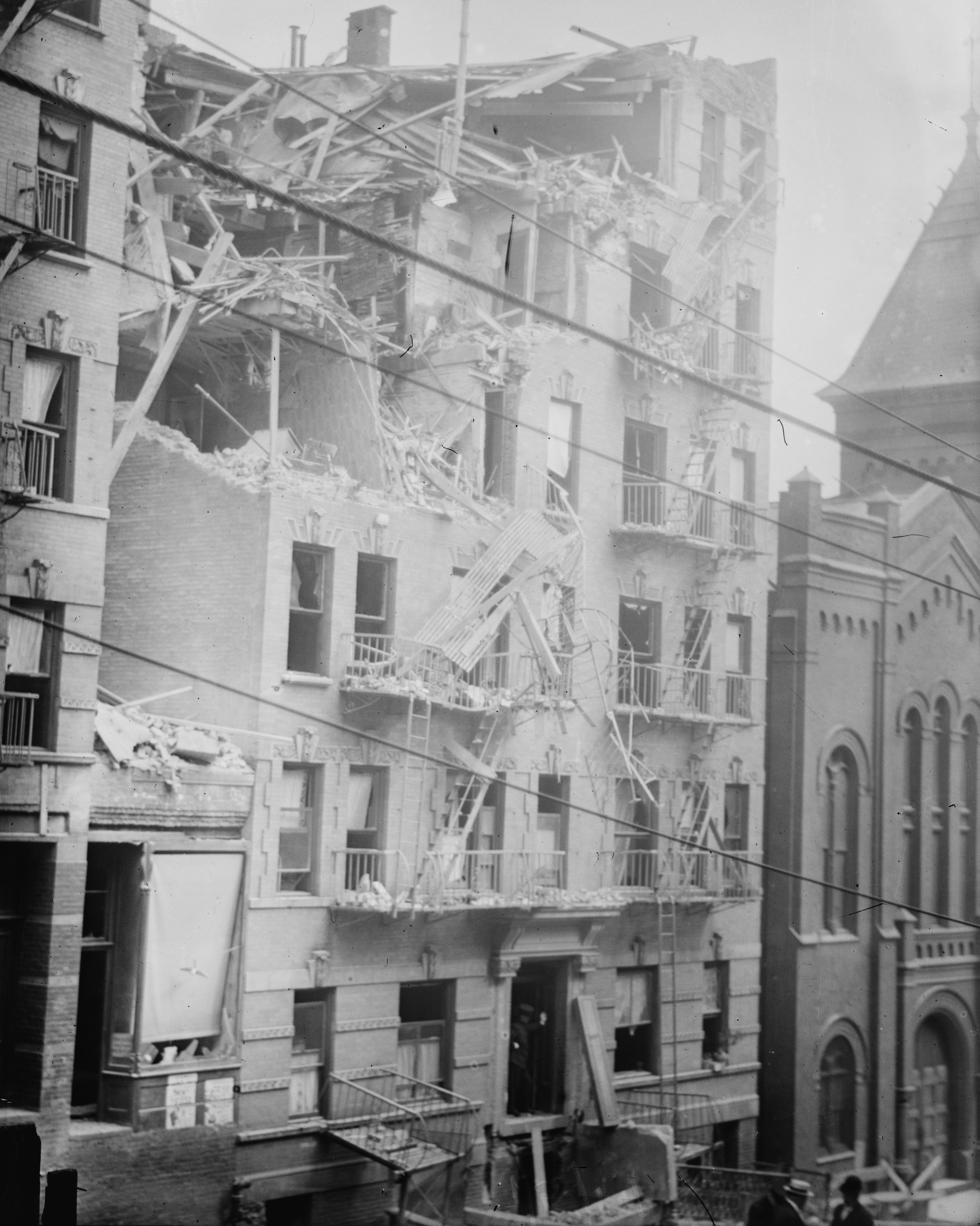
The building where the bomb intended for Rockefeller exploded, 1914

Bomb attacks were relatively common in the early 20th century. A terrorist bomb exploded prematurely inside an apartment of the Anarchist Black Cross in 1914. The bomb was intended to kill business magnate John D. Rockefeller, who had been blamed for the Ludlow Massacre. Another bomb set up by labor leaders exploded in San Francisco during a Preparedness Day parade in 1916, killing 10 people. The Sacramento Governor's Mansion was bombed in 1917 during an attempt to assassinate governor William Stephens. About 30 bombs were sent to political leaders in the country, including U.S. attorney general A. Mitchell Palmer, in 1919.

Tensions over housing and labor following World War I led to the Red Summer of 1919, which involved racial terrorism and riots across the United States. The death of a Black child at a segregated swimming area, combined with labor tensions between White and Black workers, led to riots that killed thirty-eight people. Black workers negotiating for better pay in Elaine, Arkansas, led to one of the most violent riots in U.S. history.

==== 1920–1940 ====
Political radicals detonated a bomb in Wall Street in 1920, killing 38 people. In 1921, the Black community of Tulsa, Oklahoma, known for their wealth and prosperity, was destroyed by a violent White mob. In 1932, the Bonus Army was cleared. In 1935, former Louisiana Governor and senator Huey Long was assassinated during a legislative session. Long had been considering a presidential bid at the time. In 1937, the Ponce massacre was perpetrated.

==== 1940–1960 ====
Following World War II, Black veterans were attacked by White Americans who now had more competition for jobs and housing. President Harry S. Truman was the target of an assassination attempt in 1950. He escaped uninjured, but two White House police officers were killed, in addition to one of the assailants. In 1951, civil rights activists Harry and Harriette Moore were murdered. On March 1, 1954, four Puerto Rican nationalists perpetrated the 1954 United States Capitol shooting, seeking to promote Puerto Rican independence from the United States. Five members of Congress were injured.

==== 1960–1980 ====
The 1960s have been called a "time of great upheaval and discord and division", which saw several major assassinations. Civil rights leader Medgar Evers was killed in 1963, hours after John F. Kennedy gave a televised civil rights address. Rushed to a hospital, he was initially refused entry due to being Black. Later that year, President Kennedy was assassinated by Lee Harvey Oswald; Oswald was killed two days later while being transported. Activist Malcolm X was assassinated in 1965 by Thomas Hagan. Civil rights activist Martin Luther King Jr. and Senator Robert F. Kennedy were both assassinated in 1968. King's assassination led to riots in more than 100 cities, and historian Mark K. Updegrove stated that his death hindered the civil rights movement since King was such an effective leader. Robert F. Kennedy was seeking the presidential nomination of the Democratic Party when he was killed, and had recently won the California primary. A large-scale riot at the Democratic National Convention in Chicago in 1968 involved 10,000 protesters against the war in Vietnam and 3,000 police officers, and was broadcast on live television. In 1968, protesters were shot in the Orangeburg Massacre. Two years later, protesters were shot in the Kent State shootings.

In 1969, Black Panther Party deputy chairman Fred Hampton was drugged, then shot and killed in his bed during a predawn raid at his Chicago apartment by a tactical unit of the Cook County State's Attorney's Office, who received aid from the Chicago Police Department and the FBI leading up to the attack. Law enforcement sprayed more than 100 gunshots throughout the apartment; the occupants fired once. During the raid, Panther Mark Clark was also killed and several others were seriously wounded. Presidential candidate George Wallace was shot at a campaign stop in Maryland, in 1972 while seeking the Democratic presidential nomination, which left him paraplegic. President Gerald Ford was the target of two assassination attempts within a matter of weeks in 1975, and escaped both incidents uninjured. In 1976, Orlando Letelier was assassinated.

During the 1960s and 1970s, many extremists joined left-wing groups, often spurred by the civil rights movement or the Vietnam War. "Underground movement" radicals associated with groups like the Weather Underground, the New World Liberation Front, Chicano Liberation Front, and the Symbionese Liberation Army claimed responsibility for hundreds of small-scale bombings in the 1970s. In an eighteen-month period between 1971 and 1972, the FBI recorded 2,500 bombings in the U.S.—nearly five per day. They were usually detonated with prior warning or at night, resulting in few casualties and limited public outcry. The bombings were usually intended to destroy property such as government buildings, with the goal of affecting decision-making rather than taking lives. The deadliest such attack in the 1970s, targeting a Wall Street restaurant in 1975, killed just four people. Public acceptance of the bombings was so pervasive that when a small bomb was detonated in a Bronx cinema, the audience refused to leave so they could keep watching the film.

==== 1980–2000 ====
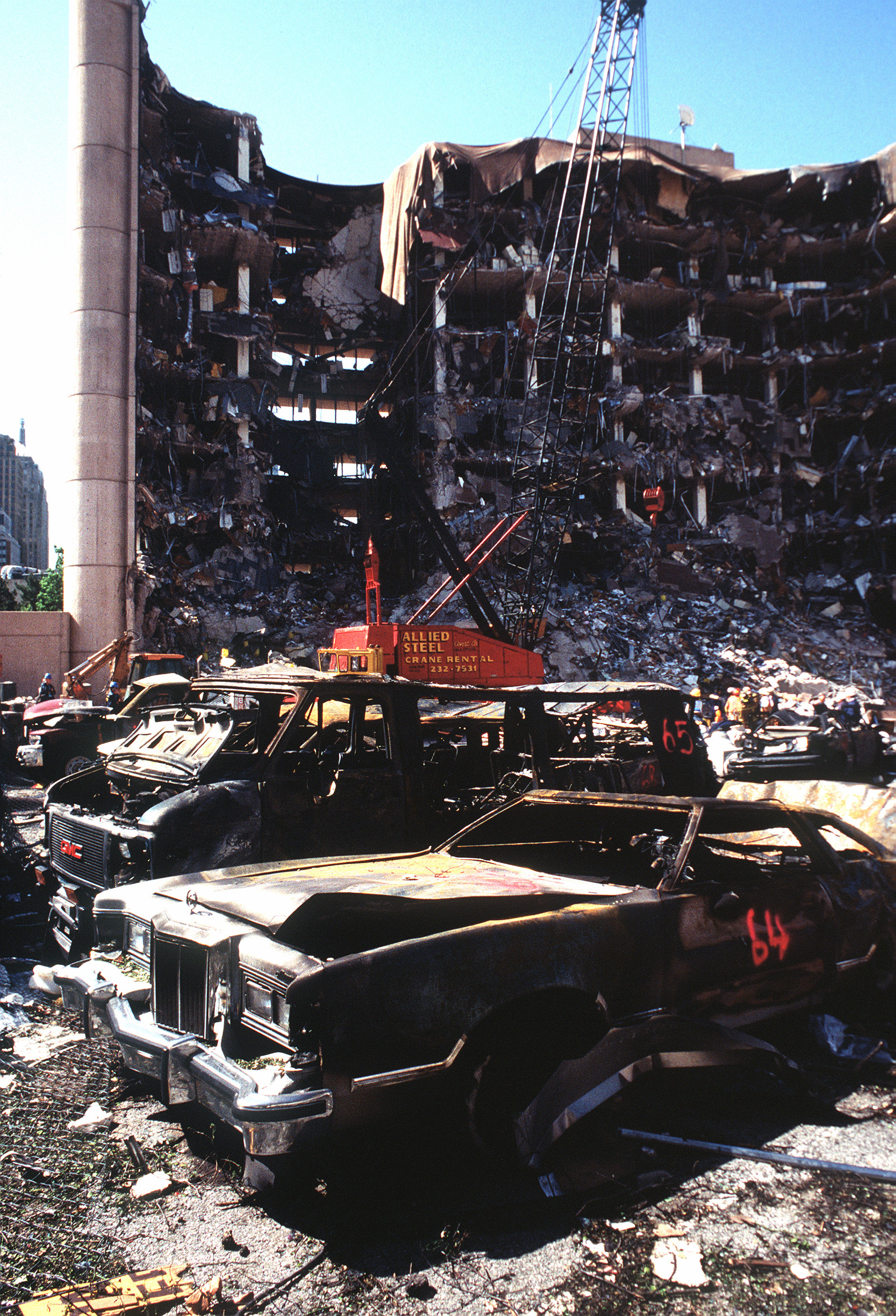
Aftermath of the bombing in Oklahoma, 1995

A 1986 Central Missouri State University comparative analysis between left-wing and right-wing extremist groups commissioned by the Department of Justice found that both left-wing and right-wing extremist groups pose dangers to the U.S., but right-wing groups were assessed as having greater potential impact due to their alignment with traditional American values. By the 1990s, more extremists were joining right-wing organizations, including militias and white supremacist groups.

President Ronald Reagan was shot in 1981 after giving a speech in Washington, D.C. His press secretary, James Brady, was shot in the attack, leaving him paralyzed. An assassination attempt of President Bill Clinton was carried out in 1994, which involved gunfire towards the White House; the perpetrator was sentenced to 40 years in prison. In 1984, writer and journalist Henry Liu was assassinated. Another example of political violence was 1985 MOVE bombing by the Philadelphia Police Department during an armed battle with MOVE, a Black liberation organization. A bomb in Oklahoma City killed 168 individuals in 1995, which the FBI described as the country's worst act of domestic terrorism. The bomb was set up by Timothy McVeigh, who held antigovernment views. Tennessee Democratic state senator Tommy Burks was assassinated by a Republican rival in 1998, when he was running for reelection.

=== 21st century ===
==== 2000–2020 ====
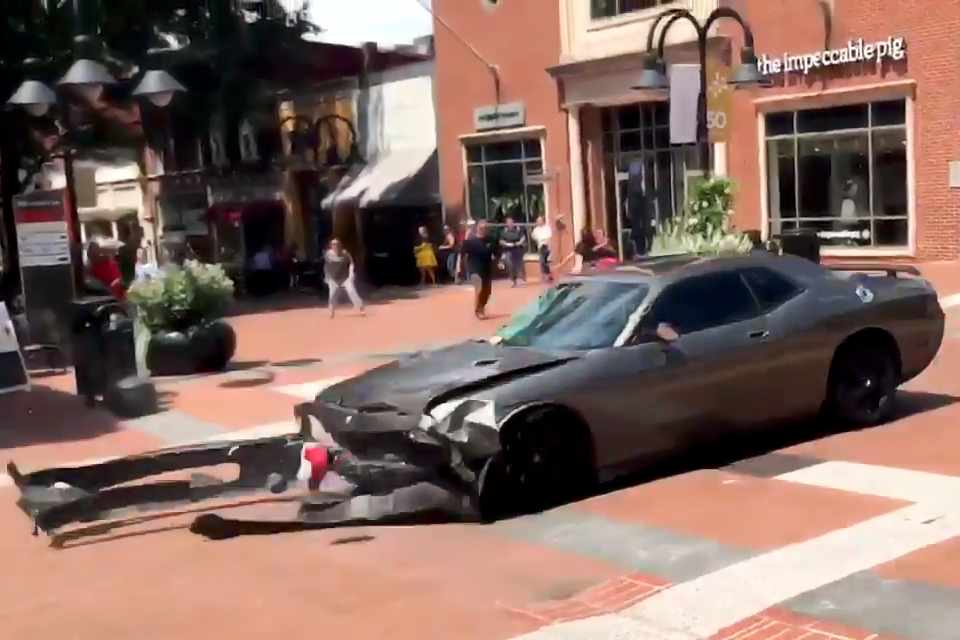
Aftermath of the 2017 Charlottesville car attack

President Barack Obama was the target of multiple failed assassination plots during his presidency. In 2009, physician George Tiller was murdered. In 2011, Congressional representative Gabby Giffords was shot in the head in an attempted assassination. The number of threats against members of Congress increased tenfold in the five years after 2016, falling again after 2020. Several Republican Congressmen were targets of a mass shooting during a practice session for the annual Congressional Baseball Game in Alexandria, Virginia, in June 2017, with then House Majority Whip Steve Scalise being critically injured. In 2016, Micah Xavier Johnson shot police. A car attack during a Charlottesville protest in 2017 killed one person and injured 35 in August 2017. Pipe bombs were planted near the homes of Barack Obama and Hillary Clinton in 2018. A paper by the Center for Strategic and International Studies, published in 2023, reported that three times more violent political acts and plots had been carried out since 2016 than in the last 25 years.

==== 2020–present ====
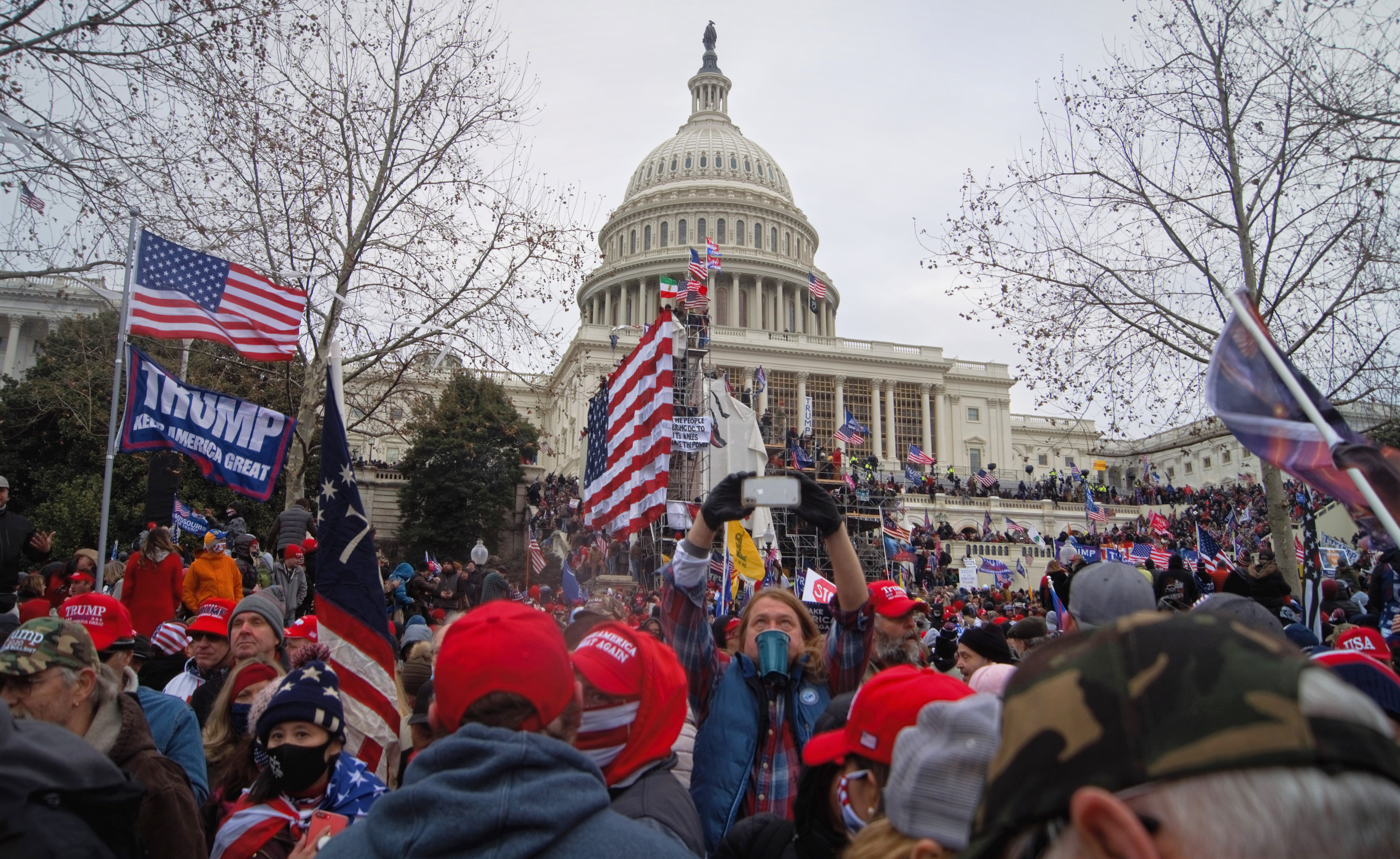
Supporters of then-President Donald Trump attempted to stop the counting of electoral votes on January 6, 2021, during the January 6 Capitol attack.

There were about 300 acts of political violence in the United States, from the January 6 attack to the 2024 election. According to the research, that was the largest surge since the 1970s. Political violence during the 2024 election was also at its highest since the 1970s, and most recent violence came from right-wing assailants.

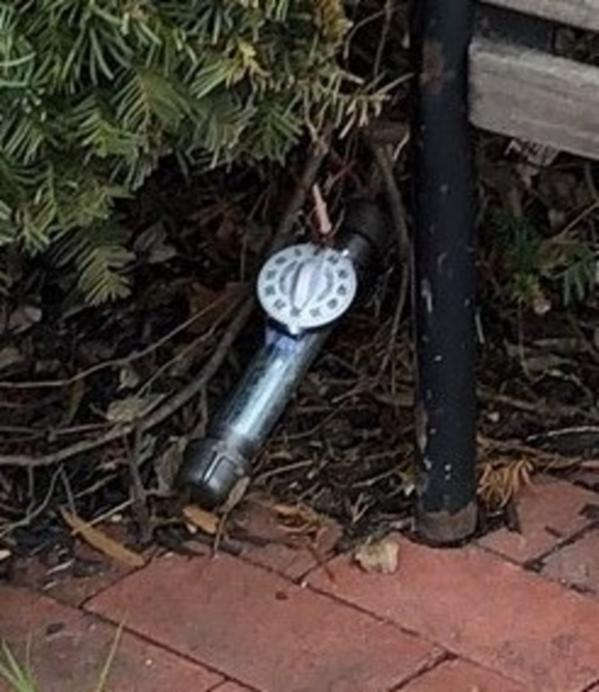
A pipe bomb was placed near the DNC building during the January 6 attacks. Vice President Kamala Harris was driven 20 feet near one of them.

As of 2023, political violence comes "overwhelmingly from the right", according to the Global Terrorism Database, FBI statistics, and other research. The Anti-Defamation League found that all of the 61 political killings in the U.S. from 2022 through 2024 were committed by right-wing extremists. A Princeton University study reported that the number of cases involving harassment and threats against local public officials had increased 74% in 2024 compared with 2022, totaling 600 cases. Serious threats against federal judges doubled from 2021 to 2023, according to the U.S. Marshals Service.

In one notable event, then Republican presumptive nominee and former president Donald Trump was shot during a rally in Butler, Pennsylvania, in July 2024. The bullet narrowly missed his temple, hitting his ear before killing an audience member behind Trump and injuring two others. Later that year, there was a second attempt on Trump's life in Florida.

The early 2020s saw protesters cleared in D.C., a plot to kidnap the Democratic governor of Michigan, Gretchen Whitmer, in October 2020, the January 6 Capitol attack in 2021, the hammer attack on Democratic Representative Nancy Pelosi's husband Paul Pelosi in 2022, and the attempted assassination of conservative Supreme Court justice Brett Kavanaugh in 2022 due to his position on the overturning of Roe v. Wade. In December 2024, UnitedHealthcare CEO Brian Thompson was killed in an allegedly politically motivated attack. In 2024, a pro-Israeli group attacked protesters at UCLA. In January 2025, several Minnesota legislators and their families were killed or had attempts on their lives. In September 2025, right-wing political activist Charlie Kirk was assassinated during a public debate in Orem, Utah. Following this, historian Mark K. Updegrove warned that political violence and rhetoric in the 2020s mirrored that of the 1960s.

In April 2026, a Kimberly-Clark warehouse was set on fire. The arson was reportedly committed over labor grievances and pay grievances, in reportedly an anti-capitalist sentiment. No deaths or injuries have been documented, but the property damage is estimated at $600 million, and the warehouse was considered a total loss.

==== Threats against local officials ====
Several U.S. cities reported increased threats against local officials in 2024 and 2025, often connected to municipal policy decisions. In Utah, the mayor of Salt Lake City received repeated violent threats related to the adoption of new city flag designs and other policy positions. A Farmington man was arrested after police said he attempted to enter the Salt Lake City–County Building and posted messages online encouraging violence toward the mayor and her family. He later pleaded guilty to misdemeanor stalking in December 2025 and was subsequently sentenced to jail.

In 2025, there was an arson attack on Democratic Pennsylvania governor Josh Shapiro's residence in April, a fatal shooting of two Israeli embassy staffers in Washington, D.C. in May, and in June, a anti-Zionist fire attack in Colorado and shootings of two Democratic Minnesota legislators and their spouses. Solomon Peña was convicted of hiring men to shoot at various Democratic politicians in response to his loss in the 2022 New Mexico House of Representatives election. Mike Jensen of the University of Maryland, which has tracked political violence since the 1970s, said that 2025 experienced 150 politically motivated attacks in the first six months, almost twice as many as there were at the same point in 2024.

== Contemporary landscape ==
Data shows that political violence had "skyrocketed" in the years prior to 2021, with threats against election administrators reaching unprecedented levels in 2020. Speaking to Reuters in 2023, University of Maryland criminologist Gary LaFree said political violence was at the worst level since the 1970s. Although widely discussed, realized acts of political violence in the United States are rare and constitute about 1% of all hate crimes.

The primary trend is the "ungrouping" of political violence as people self-radicalize via the Internet, with most political violence committed by people who do not belong to any formal organization. Journalist Stefan Grobe writes that extremist ideologies spread on social media, where "a crude language of memes, slang and jokes blurs the line between posturing and provoking violence, normalising radical ideologies and activities". Since 2016, there has been a large increase in attacks on politicians and government employees. In April 2024, the Global Project Against Hate and Extremism reported that several far-right extremist accounts had gained substantial numbers of followers on mainstream social media platforms between June 2023 and March 2024. START researcher Michael Jensen recorded 150 politically motivated attacks in the first half of 2025, almost twice the number in the same period in 2024.

Studies of political violence in the United States have typically listed right-wing extremist, left-wing extremist and Islamist as the main ideological categories. There is no federal database of political violence in the United States, and studies have produced varied tallies depending on how violence and ideology is defined. Perpetrators of political violence, who may be mentally ill, often defy a clear ideological classification.

=== Right-wing extremism ===
According to a September 2025 Cato Institute review, when the September 11 attacks are excluded, 63% of politically motivated extremist killings in the U.S. since 1975 have been caused by right-wing perpetrators, with Islamists causing 23% and left-wing perpetrators 10%. When September 11 is included, Islamists account for 87% of killings (not shown in chart).

According to a 2021 Criminology, Criminal Justice, Law & Society study, between 1990–2020, victims of far-right ideologically motivated homicides in the U.S. substantially outnumbered victims of far-left perpetrators. Far-right homicides have also occurred more often than jihadi violence inspired by Islamic extremism (not shown in chart).

Multiple studies from 1975 onward have found greater rates of right-wing political violence in the United States, as well as causing more deaths, compared to that of other ideological groups. Bruce Hoffman stated this is partially due to the prevalence of militia organizations, and that the extreme left were more likely to target property rather than people. Perpetrators of far-right planned violence are older and more established than typical domestic terrorists—they frequently have jobs, are married, or have children. Political violence has been greatest "in suburbs where Asian American and Hispanic American immigration has been growing fastest, particularly in heavily Democratic metropoles surrounded by Republican-dominated rural areas."

As of 2021, the right-wing subgroups most prone to violence included white evangelical Christians, who believe in the QAnon conspiracy alleging widespread pedophilia among Democratic politicians and celebrities; and Republicans who "feel threatened by either women or minorities".

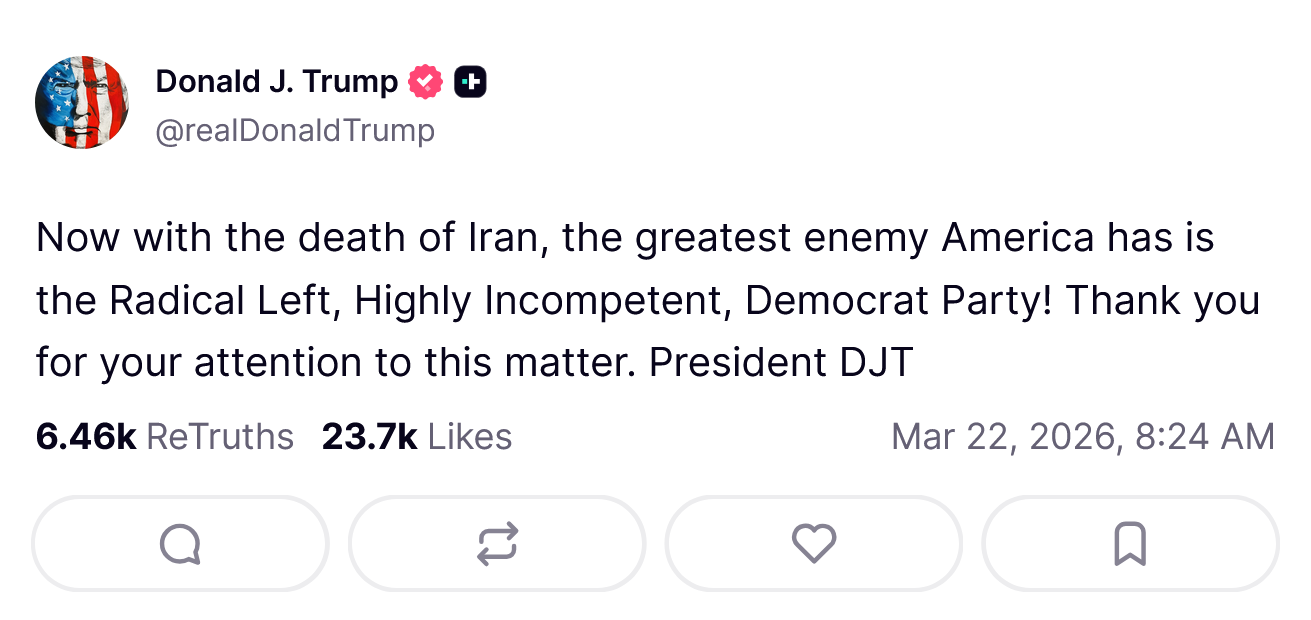
Trump regularly uses social media to criticize his political opponents. Democratic officials have criticized the posts as encouraging political violence.

President Trump has been identified as a key figure in increasing political violence in the U.S. Reuters reported that political violence increased greatly following the election of Trump in 2016, noting his use of "incendiary rhetoric", which has been described as a form of stochastic terrorism. For instance, in November 2025, Trump made multiple social media posts calling Democrats traitors who should be charged with sedition, punishable by death, and shared a social media post calling for Democrats to be hanged.

According to the Anti-Defamation League, all 61 political killings between 2022 and 2024 were committed by right-wing extremists. Counterterrorism experts described Trump's previous pardon of the January 6 attackers as having created a permission structure for them to commit political violence. A week after the assassination of Charlie Kirk in September 2025, the U.S. Department of Justice removed a 2024 study, titled "What NIJ Research Tells Us About Domestic Terrorism", which showed that white supremacist and far-right violence "continues to outpace all other types of terrorism and domestic violent extremism" in the United States, in contrast to statements made by the Trump administration. Right-wing political violence in the United States sharply declined in the months after the second election of Trump.

=== Left-wing extremism ===
In modern United States history, a minority of acts of political violence have been committed by left-wing extremists. Left-wing political violence has increased since 2016 when Donald Trump was elected president, and according to one study which was conducted by the Center for Strategic and International Studies, by September 2025, it eclipsed right-wing political violence for the first time in more than 30 years. The report noted five left-wing terrorist attacks in the first half of 2025 compared to one act of right-wing terrorism, and described left-wing violence as having risen from "very low levels". A 2021 Criminology, Criminal Justice, Law & Society study covering 1990–2020 also found a "gradual linear increase" in far-left homicide incidents, with 40.5% of those studied occurring during Donald Trump's first term of 2016–2020 (compared to 11.0% of far-right incidents), and 2017 being the only year where far-left homicide incidents outnumbered far-right ones. Left-wing terrorism was most prominent in the United States in the 1960s and 1970s with groups such as the Weather Underground and Symbionese Liberation Army, before declining in the 1980s and 1990s as right-wing and jihadist terrorism rose.

Left-wing political violence in the United States is typically directed at specific individuals rather than groups, and it has most commonly occurred at government or law enforcement facilities. A 2025 Terrorism and Political Violence study found that self-proclaimed antifa supporters are more likely to support violence toward outgroups compared to people who did not support a fringe group, similar to QAnon supporters on the right. Antifa supporters in the United States have primarily committed violence in the context of ideological clashes at protests.

=== Islamist extremism ===
According to the Center for Strategic and International Studies, between 1994 and 2024, 140 violent attacks were either conducted or planned by Islamist extremists (jihadists) in the United States. Since 2001, the number of attacks by jihadists has peaked twice: during the first years of Barack Obama's presidency (2009–2013) and during the peak of the rule of the Islamic State (2014–2019). The number of Islamist terrorist attacks declined significantly after the Islamic State's defeat and loss of territory in 2019, but individual incidents continue to occur. Most acts of jihadist violence in the United States have been perpetrated by U.S. citizens, and foreign nationals have also committed some notable attacks. The 2001 September 11 attacks—by far the deadliest single instance of politically motivated terrorism in modern United States history—has been attributed to Islamist extremism.

=== Contributing factors ===
The strongest predictors of whether someone justifies or commits political violence include aggressive or authoritarian personality traits, poor self-control, and hostile sexist beliefs. Political and social enablers of political violence include dehumanizing and denigrating rhetoric from political leaders and their normalization of violence. Also contributing to political violence is a sense of threat or increased fear (caused by things like pandemics or rises in crime). A 2021 analysis found that, across party lines, the people most likely to support political violence were those who held hostility towards women.

Another risk factor for election violence is partisan division based on identity. Americans have shifted from mixed, cross-cutting identities to aligned partisan packages where multiple identities (urban/rural, race, religion, gender) tend to be highly correlated with one's political party. This makes political attacks feel personal—threatening one's entire identity rather than just policy preferences—intensifying political disputes. The 2020s' patterns of political violence resemble the 19th century, where one's race, ethnicity, religion, and immigration status is associated with their partisan identity. Despite efforts to reduce affective polarization—how much members of the opposing party like each other—there is little evidence that it contributes to political violence.

=== Support for political violence ===
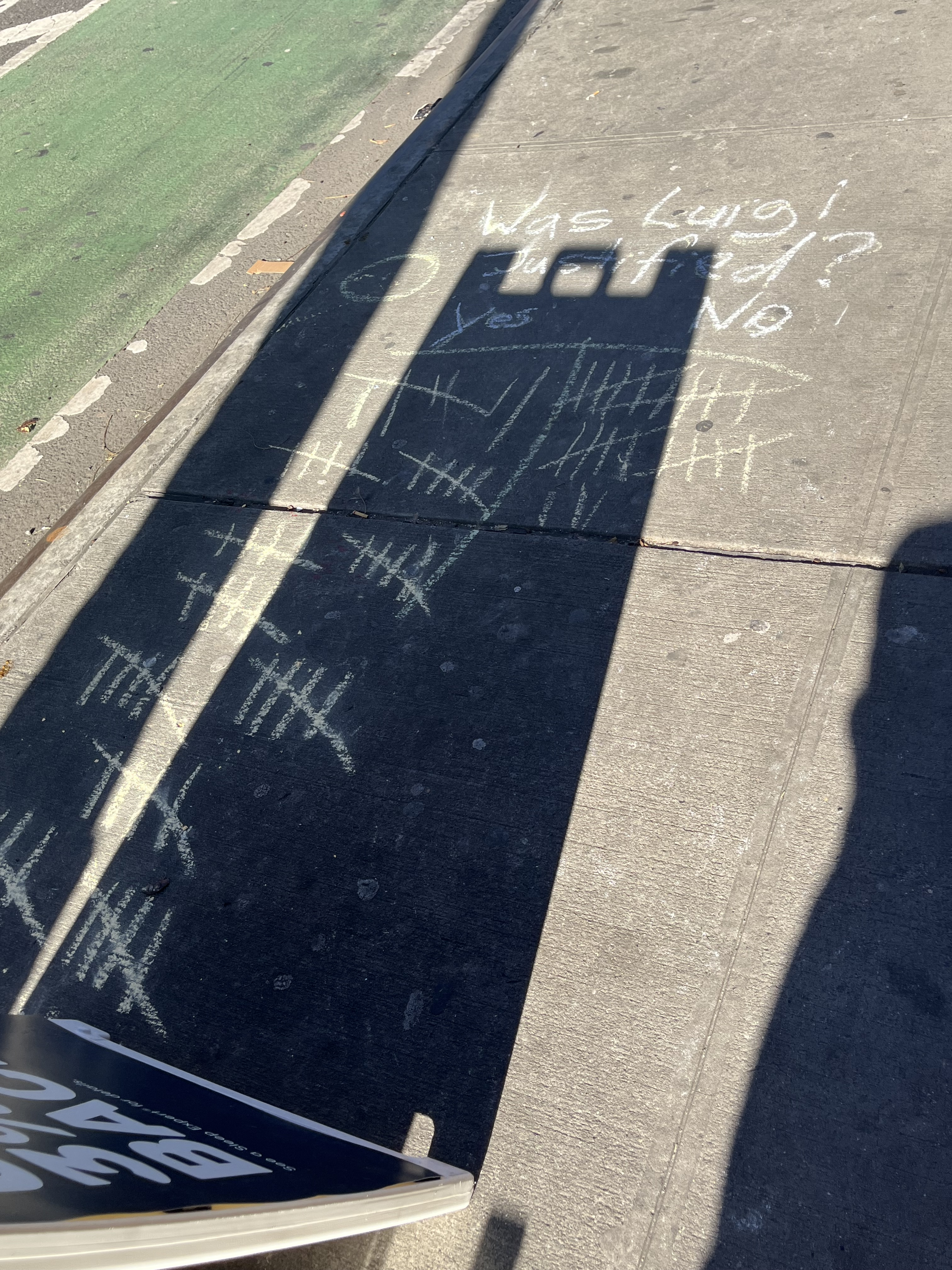
A graffiti in New York asks "was Luigi justified?"

In the 21st century, public support for political violence increased throughout the latter half of the 2010s. Endorsements of violence "suddenly leapt" in October 2020. By February 2021, more than two-thirds of Republicans and half of Democrats saw the other party as "downright evil", and over half of Republicans agreed that "if elected leaders will not protect America, the people must do it themselves even if it requires taking violent action". Leading up to 2022, scientific research reported that between 8% to 40% of Americans supported political violence. A September 2025 poll by YouGov found that 20% of Americans between 18–29 years old believed political violence was sometimes justified, higher than any other age group.

A 2022 academic paper stated that U.S. surveys have overestimated the rate of support for political violence due to methodological flaws. According to G. Elliott Morris, polling tends to exaggerate approval of political violence. Asking more precise questions, less than 5% condone violent felonies, with little difference between parties. Furthermore, individuals tend to significantly overestimate approval of violence within the other party, and are less likely to support it themselves when correctly informed. According to political analyst Bruce Hoffman, Americans have become more prone to accept previously stigmatized political speech. He stated that the suspect who allegedly killed UnitedHealthcare CEO Brian Thompson became a "folk hero" and had a musical in his honor sell out in theaters.

== Lists of incidents ==
The following are lists of incidents of political violence in the United States.

=== Assassination plots and killings ===
- List of assassinated American politicians
- List of journalists killed in the United States
- List of members of the United States Congress killed or wounded in office
- List of United States federal judges killed in office
- List of United States presidential assassination attempts and plots
- List of assassinations#United States
- List of people who survived assassination attempts

=== Duels ===
- List of Confederate duels
- List of duels in the United States

=== Riots, civil unrest and massacres ===
- List of ethnic riots#United States
- List of expulsions of African Americans
- List of incidents of civil unrest in the United States
- List of massacres in the United States
- List of rebellions in the United States

=== Terrorist attacks ===
- Domestic terrorism in the United States § Notable domestic terrorist attacks
- Terrorism in the United States § Attacks by type
- Timeline of terrorist attacks in the United States

=== Other incidents ===
- List of incidents of political violence in Washington, D.C.
- Timeline of violent incidents at the United States Capitol
- List of violent incidents involving Andrew Jackson
- List of police violence incidents during George Floyd protests

== See also ==
- Algorithmic radicalization
- Anti-union violence in the United States
- Armed standoffs in the United States
- Crime in the United States
- Democratic backsliding in the United States
- Discrimination in the United States
- Dueling in the Southern United States – Extinct practice in the American South
- First Amendment to the United States Constitution – 1791 amendment limiting government restriction of civil liberties
- Government attacks on journalists in the United States – U.S. attacks against journalists within the country
- Hate crime laws in the United States – State and federal laws intended to protect against bias crimes
- History of civil rights in the United States
- History of immigration to the United States
- Human rights in the United States
- Lynching § United States
  - Lynching in the United States – Occurrence of extrajudicial killings
    - List of lynching victims in the United States
      - Lynching of American Jews
- Mass racial violence in the United States
- Monopoly on violence – Core legal concept and definition of a state
- NSPM-7 – 2025 US President Trump national security directive
- Police brutality in the United States
- Police riot – Riot caused by the police
- Political prisoners in the United States – History of political imprisonment in the United States
- Political repression in the United States
- Politics of the United States
  - Politics of the Southern United States
- Radicalism in the United States – Historical American ideology
  - Radical right (United States) – Political preference that leans towards the far-right
- Secession in the United States – Unconstitutional American political concept
- Second Amendment to the United States Constitution – 1791 amendment protecting the right to keep and bear arms
- Terrorism in the United States
  - Domestic terrorism in the United States – Incidents of American terrorism
  - Timeline of terrorist attacks in the United States
  - United States and state terrorism – Terrorism allegations against the U.S.
  - United States and state-sponsored terrorism – U.S. support given to terrorist and paramilitary organizations
- United States war crimes
