= Gypsy Taub =

American naturism activist

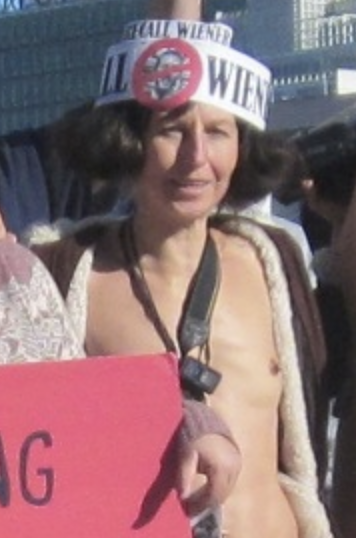
- Taub protesting a nudity ban in 2013
- Born: Oxana Chornenky; 1969 (age 56–57); Moscow, Russian SFSR, Soviet Union
- Education: Massachusetts Institute of Technology (dropped out); City College of San Francisco (dropped out)
- Occupation: Activist
- Criminal charges: Attempted child abduction, stalking, and child abuse
- Criminal status: Paroled
- Spouse: Jaymz Smith (m. 2013–2015)
- Children: 3

Gypsy Taub (born Oxana Chornenky) is a Russian American activist in the San Francisco public nudity movement.

== Early life and education ==
Taub was raised in Moscow and went by the nickname Olessia, which means "Forest Girl". Her father was a physicist and inventor, and her mother was a French teacher and fashion designer. Taub grew up with a brother and a sister.

In the fall of 1988, when Taub was 19, she moved to Boston to attend the Massachusetts Institute of Technology, and her family immigrated to Boston the following year. When she was 23, she attended the City College of San Francisco as a pre-med student. She dropped out after 18 months.

== Career ==
Initially when arriving in the United States, Taub worked as a stripper and nude model. In the late 1990s, she began filming amateur pornography and publishing the videos on her own adult website.

In 1995, Taub changed her first name to Gypsy and became a Deadhead. She began her activism shortly after her daughter was born in 2000. A 9/11 truther, Taub began a public access television show called Uncensored 9/11 to increase awareness of her beliefs that the September 11, 2001 attacks were an inside job orchestrated by the government. She hosted the show without clothes on. In 2008, she started a cable television show named My Naked Truth.

In 2012, San Francisco supervisor Scott Wiener proposed that any city resident older than five years could be fined $100 if they appeared in public naked. The proposed law also allowed for up to a year in jail on the third offense. Taub led a movement of activists who protested against the law. A public hearing on the proposed law was held at San Francisco City Hall on November 5, 2012. Taub went to the hearing along with her three children. The overwhelming majority of the people at the hearing opposed Wiener's proposal. She wore a shift dress and no underwear. She then took off her dress and was escorted out of the hearing room and detained. She filed a class action lawsuit against the ban at the Ninth Circuit Court of Appeals. Five plaintiffs signed the suit and it was filed by Christina DiEdoardo three months before the nudity ban went into effect in February 2013. DiEdoardo stopped representing the lawsuit's plaintiffs since there were disagreements between the plaintiffs. Gill Sperlein served as Taub's second lawyer for the suit. He was previously a member of Wiener's campaign committee. DiEdoardo claimed that the police were discriminating in regards to who could be nude in the city, noting that they went for people who had little political influence. In the two years since the ban was put into effect, Taub was denied a permit ten times, once for a parade of fewer than 50 members despite there being no policy in San Francisco's police code defining a minimum number of people required to have a parade. A discrimination claim by Taub was settled for $20,000 by the city in June 2015, and in September, she was granted a restraining order against the police department to prevent them denying her a permit for a nude parade at Jane Warner Plaza that was held that month.

In 2014, Taub posed for a photoshoot for a New York magazine story about San Francisco. It depicts her standing naked in line to ride a Google Bus. Jessica Powell, Google's vice president for product and corporate communications, responded by saying there should be "no nudes on the bus. It might interfere with the Wi-Fi." In 2015, Taub was arrested for protesting San Francisco's no-nudity ordinance while nude.

On September 13, 2017, Taub attended a Berkeley City Council meeting about a proposal by the Topfreedom "Free the Nipple" campaign to allow woman to go topless in public. Officials of the council postponed a decision, because one of them, Sophie Hahn, felt it was not an important issue for the city to address, and over concerns that men would have to cover up their nipples too. At the end of the meeting, Taub stripped off her clothes and criticized the council members.

== Personal life ==
Taub attended a Montana Rainbow Gathering, where she met Jaymz Smith, who was 20 at the time and came from Jackson, Missouri. The two were engaged in Berkeley, California and married via a nude wedding protest at City Hall on December 19, 2013. Time magazine later listed the wedding as one of "The 17 Most Intriguing Weddings of All Time". Taub and Smith lived in a flat in Berkeley until splitting up in December 2015.

Taub also had a sporadic relationship with David DePape, later known as the perpetrator of the 2022 attack on Paul Pelosi. DePape lived with Taub and Smith for some time, and he served as a father figure to Taub's three children. He was also a best man at Taub's wedding with Smith. Taub attended the first day of DePape's trial, along with her two adult children whom DePape helped raise.

In 2019, Taub was arrested and charged for attempted child abduction, stalking, and child abuse relating to a 14-year-old boy who had been friends with her son. Despite court orders, Taub had sent numerous messages to the boy and attempted to have him run away from his mother, who was seeking a restraining order against Taub. In 2021, Taub was convicted on all charges relating to the case and sentenced to four years in state prison. She was paroled in April 2023.

In June 2024 during DePape's trial, Taub was barred from the court by the judge. Taub was accused of attempting to influence the jury by handing out fliers advertising a website.
