= 1917 California Governor's Mansion bombing =

1917 attack in California, US

Coordinates: 38.5801°N 121.4849°W

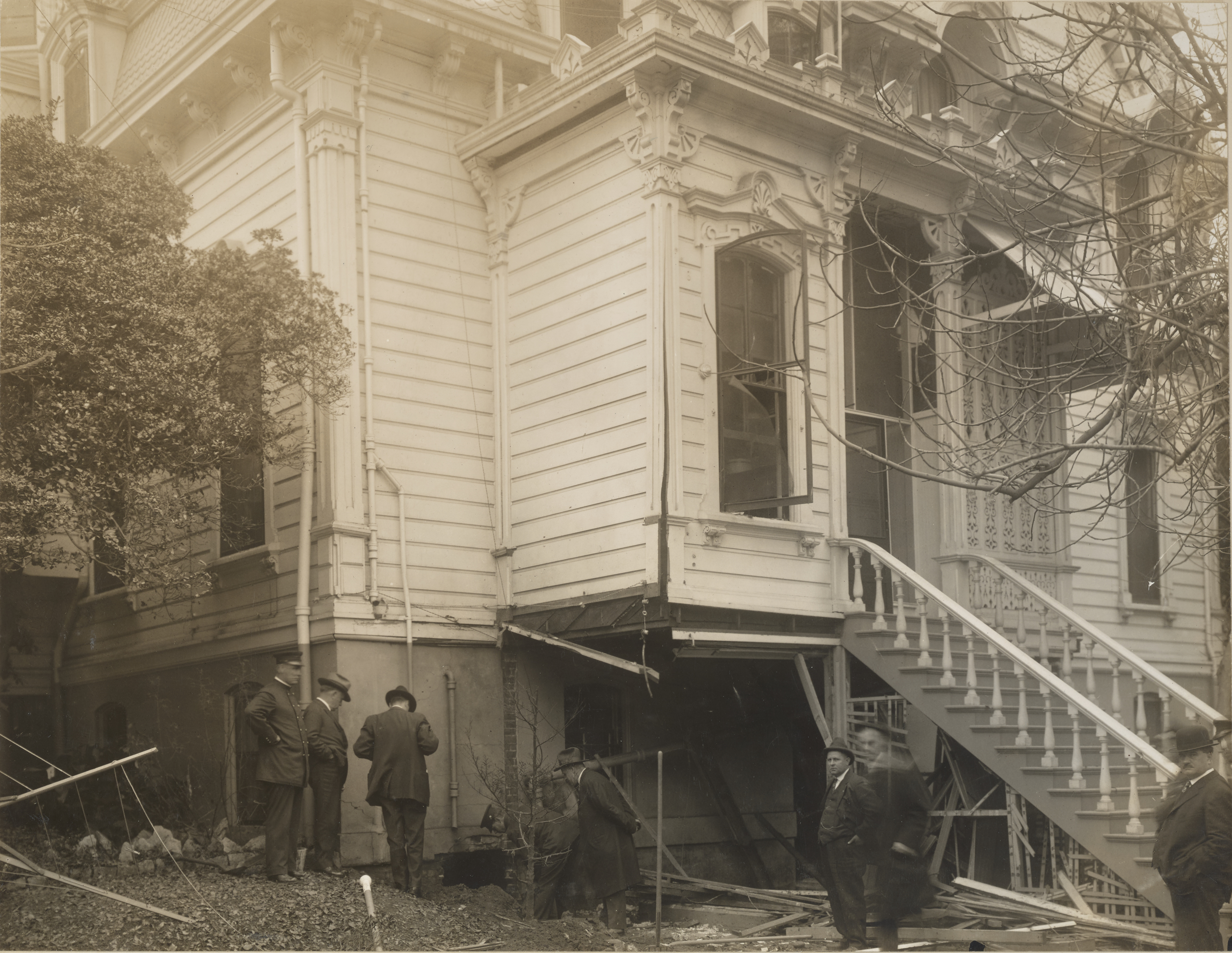
Damage from the bombing (2/1/1918)

The 1917 California Governor's Mansion bombing took place just before midnight on December 17, 1917 when about 25 sticks of dynamite exploded near the rear porch of the Governor's Mansion just blocks from the California State Capitol Building.

== Background ==
Well known labor leader and suspected dynamitist, Thomas Mooney, was tried and convicted in 1916 for the Preparedness Day Bombing in San Francisco, which led to the death of ten and injury of forty more. His trial was a mere show trial with coached witnesses and testimony later found to be false. While the American Socialist Party was at first ready to expel him, his local branch stood by him and he began to gain the support of an increasingly agitated domestic and international left wing community, which only further radicalized with the introduction of military conscription. So much so that Woodrow Wilson felt compelled to start a letter writing campaign to the Governor of California William Stephens to commute Mooney's death sentence. Stephens seemed to have missed his chance when in November 1917, The San Francisco Call ran an exposé suggesting Mooney was framed by prosecutors, basing its findings on a federal investigation conducted under Wilson's orders. The allegations later gained even more credibility as the public learned that the prosecution’s case was riddled with perjury, corruption, suppression of evidence, conflict of interest, and other irregularities ignored by prosecutors. Efforts to recall local District Attorney Charles Fickert, who spearheaded the effort to prosecute Mooney, gained attention as the details of the prosecution were published.

== Bombing ==
At 11:55 p.m. on December 17, 1917, the Governor and his wife Flora awoke to what they described as a "nervous shock". While no one was injured, including all of the servants, windows were shattered as far as two to three blocks away. When the police arrived, they found Governor Stephens, with little care, wading through the wet, muddy basement in search of a clue as to how the bomb had been placed. While neither he nor his guard had seen the perpetrator nor the act first hand, they both expressed the belief that the bomb had been thrown from an alley running about 40 feet from the rear of the house. As for the motive, Stephens was convinced of it "probably having been done with a view to terrorism, the chief weapon of the alien enemy," a claim likely linked to his recent series of addresses urging support for the war.

Accounts of one to two men seen fleeing the scene as crowds began to gather were recorded, but none were found despite an extensive search of downtown.

== Aftermath ==
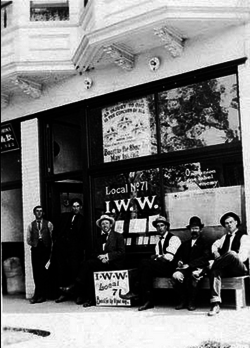
Men outside IWW Local No. 71

Almost immediately, the Sacramento Chief of Police and most newspapers blamed the Industrial Workers of the World. On Christmas Eve, two members of the IWW were arrested after police claimed they'd picked up dynamite at the union's headquarters in Sacramento. Three days later, the Governor received a letter giving him an ultimatum: $50,000 or nine bombs will be set off across the city. While nothing came of the letter, police raided locals across Northern California and a further 51 union workers were arrested and thrown in jail in January 1918, where 5 died (four to the influenza epidemic and one to tuberculosis) A further 46 were charged with conspiracy to violate the Espionage Act in spite of protests from a local Department of Justice agent. His concerns regarding the prosecution's motives fell on deaf ears in large part because Governor Stephens, Assistant Attorney General Raymond General, the President of the Sacramento Chamber of Commerce and the publisher of the Sacramento Bee all pushed hard for charges and a conviction. Their efforts succeeded and in January 1919, a jury took one hour to convict all 46. All but three were sentenced from 1 to 10 years. The exceptions included two who had access to attorneys and received 2 month sentences as well as the one woman who received a fine. In total, 2,000 Wobblies (IWW members) were arrested between 1917 and 1918 for "anarchism" or "anti-war efforts".

Weeks after the trial of the 46 IWW members, the California Criminal Syndicalism Act was signed into law, making it a felony, punishable by 1 to 14 years in prison, to advocate "violence or sabotage" as a means of bringing about "a change in industrial ownership or control, or affecting any political change." The statute was used to broadly intimidate political opponents from speaking out and was ruled unconstitutional almost 50 years later.

This harsh crackdown on labor and the months long anti-union campaigning by the Chamber of Commerce and Downtown Association led many progressives to voice their suspicion. The District Attorney's election had taken place the day after the bombing after all, and the heavy press coverage surely would have helped him. What's more: the bomber didn't seem intent to injure. With all this in mind, a San Francisco reporter on the beat learned that the mansion's guard may have worked with a prominent detective to set up the whole thing. That detective, Martin Swanson, had in fact attempted to set up Mooney in a similar fashion years earlier.

== See also ==
- Gretchen Whitmer kidnapping plot – October 8, 2020
- Attack on Paul Pelosi – October 28, 2022
- 2025 Pennsylvania Governor's Residence arson – April 13, 2025
