= Indomitable Will =

2012 biography of Lyndon B. Johnson by Mark K. Updegrove

Indomitable Will: LBJ in the Presidency
- Author: Mark K. Updegrove
- Language: English
- Publisher: Crown Publishing Group
- Publication date: March 13, 2012
- Publication place: United States
- Media type: Hardcover
- Pages: 400

Indomitable Will: LBJ in the Presidency is a biography of Lyndon Baines Johnson by Mark K. Updegrove, published in 2012.

== Plot summary ==
Indomitable Will is a compilation of original interviews, personal accounts and recollections of individuals who knew, worked with and for President Lyndon Johnson during his five years as President of the United States. Sources include the Reverend Billy Graham, Carl Bernstein, Liz Carpenter, George H. W. Bush, Walter Mondale, Harry J. Middleton, Rose Kennedy, Gerald R. Ford, Helen Thomas, Ted Kennedy, and Bill Moyers, who served as White House Press Secretary in the Johnson Administration.

The book focuses on the extensive legislation passed during Johnson’s Presidency and includes photographs, transcripts from his telephone conversations, and previously unpublished documents.

The author is a Presidential historian who has written two additional non-fiction works based on the lives of American Presidents: Baptism by Fire: Eight Presidents Who Took Office in Times of Crisis (2009), and Second Acts: Presidential Lives and Legacies After the White House (2006).
