= Nude wedding =

Marriage ceremony with naked participants

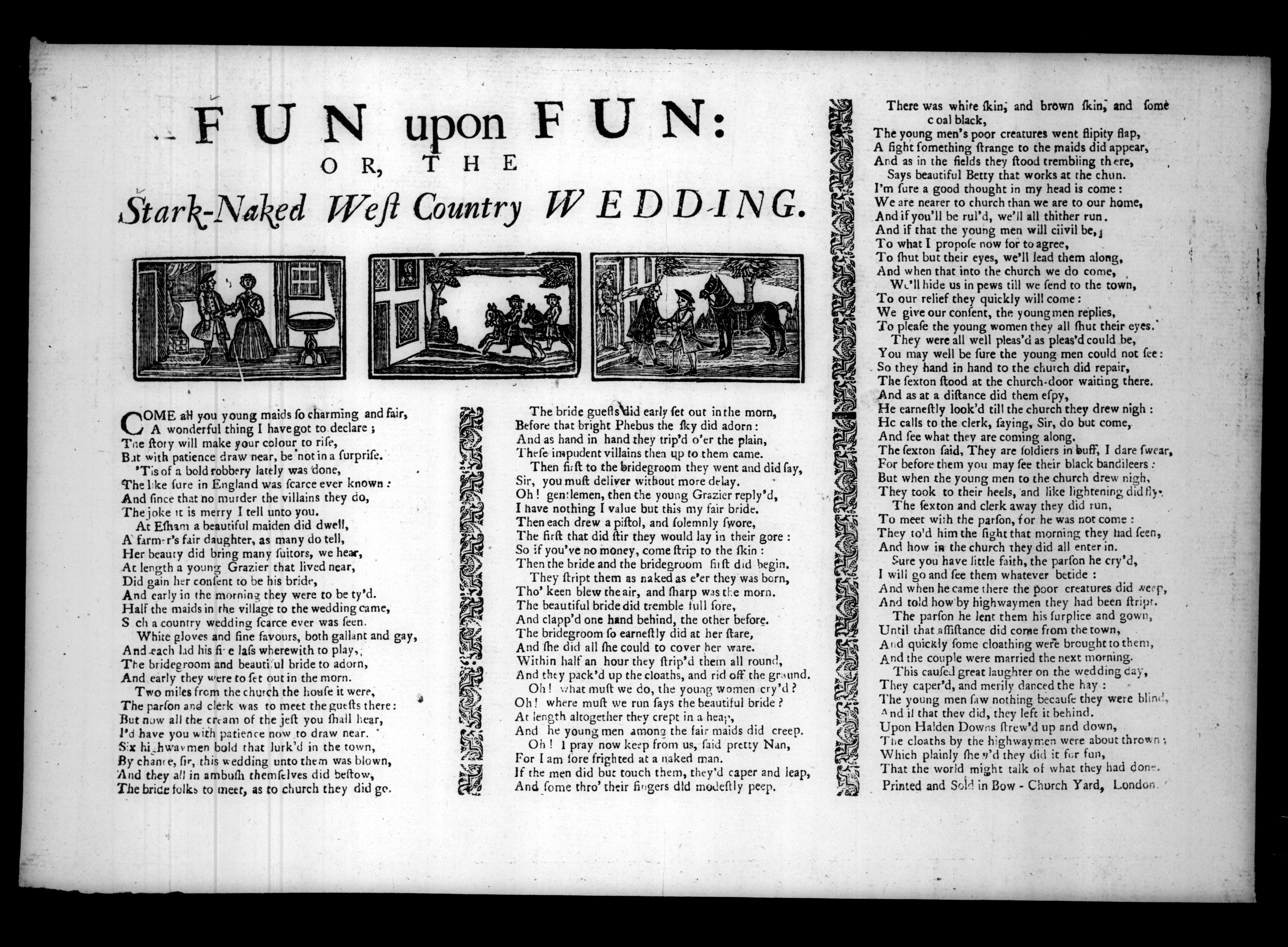
Account of a naked wedding in 1750

Nude weddings, also known as naked marriages, are weddings that may include the couple, bridal parties, and/or guests in the nude. Participants may be committed to the nudist lifestyle or want a different kind of wedding.

The wedding couple may be nude while the guests may come nude or dressed, or with the couple and all the guests naked. There are 270 clubs in America that are clothes-free or clothes-optional, and some of these serve as locations for nude weddings.

In China, "naked wedding" has come to mean a simple, low-budget wedding, not involving the purchase of a house, car, or wedding rings. Such weddings have become more popular. The term does not refer to actual nudity.

== Growth of the nude wedding ==
The first publicized nude wedding took place at the Garden of Eden at the 1934 World's Fair in Chicago. There has been an increase in nude weddings with the growth of nude recreational practices. According to the American Association for Nude Recreation (AANR), founded in 1931, nude recreation grew 75 percent during the 1990s. Today, the AANR estimates it has grown to be a 440 million dollar industry, from $120 million in 1992.

== Traditional elements ==
Nude weddings can include traditional flowers, veils and accessories, music, and food. An official conducts the ceremony and legal requirements are as for any other wedding.

== World's largest nude wedding ==
The largest nude wedding took place 2003 in Jamaica with 29 couples married at the same time. The wedding was at Hedonism III in Runaway Bay, Jamaica on Valentine's Day. The ceremony was conducted by Rev. Frank Cervasio of the Universal Life Church in Florida. Participants were required to stay a minimum of 4 days, and arrive on February 12, two days before the marriage ceremony.

== In popular culture ==
Nude weddings are the norm in the fictional Betazoid culture in Star Trek because of their ability to see thoughts and emotions of others. This gift evolved their society into an open one, which allowed nude weddings without taboo.

A nude wedding scene appears in the 1968 film Girls Come Too (later re-titled How I Became a Nudist). Maria Stinger and her real-life husband Harry Stinger (credited as Dick Powers) play a couple who marry in a nudist ceremony at a Miami nudist camp.

== See also ==
- Body image
- Naked party
