= 2025 Pennsylvania Governor's Residence arson =

2025 arson attack in Pennsylvania, U.S.

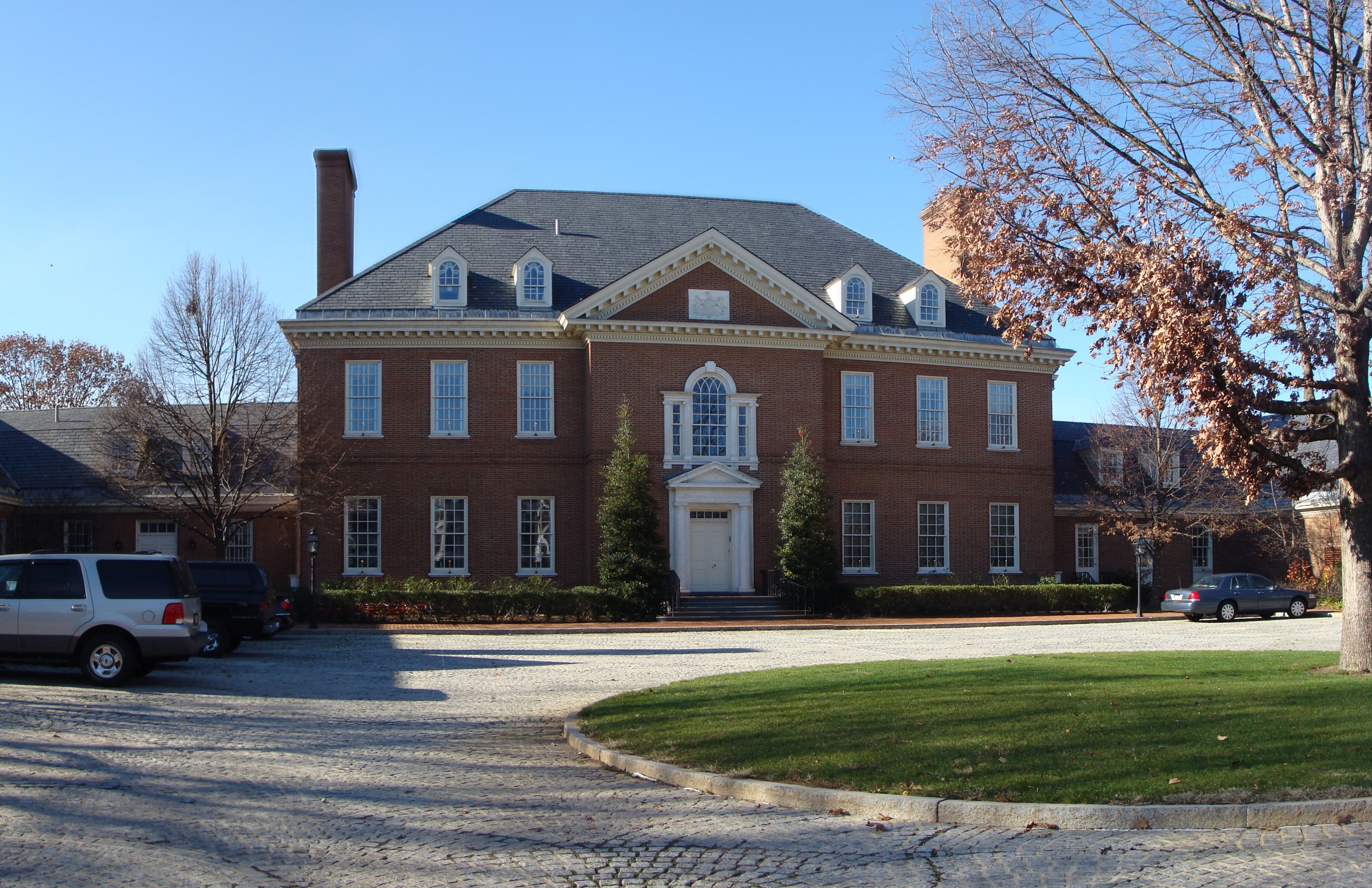
- The Pennsylvania Governor's Residence (shown in 2010), scene of the 2025 political assassination attempt
- Date: April 13, 2025
- Time: c. 2 a.m. (EDT)
- Location: Pennsylvania Governor's Residence, Harrisburg, Pennsylvania; 40.2773°N 76.8985°W
- Also known as: Attempted assassination of Josh Shapiro
- Motive: Hatred against Shapiro because of Palestinian deaths in the Gaza war
- Perpetrator: Cody Allen Balmer
- Deaths: 0
- Injuries: 0
- Property damage: Heavy damage to a portion of the home
- Charges: Attempted murder, terrorism, aggravated arson, aggravated assault
- Verdict: Pled guilty
- Sentence: 25 to 50 years in prison (parole eligibility beginning April 13, 2050)

On Sunday, April 13, 2025, part of the Pennsylvania Governor's Residence in Harrisburg was set on fire in a political assassination attempt while Governor Josh Shapiro and his family slept inside. The perpetrator, 38-year-old Cody Allen Balmer (born March 23, 1987), a former mechanic from nearby Penbrook, Pennsylvania, was later arrested and charged with terrorism, attempted murder, aggravated arson, and aggravated assault after he turned himself in to the police.

The attack occurred on the first night of Passover, around 2 a.m. ET, just hours after Shapiro and his family had partaken in a Passover Seder. According to authorities, Balmer reported that he was planning to physically assault Governor Shapiro, using a small sledgehammer, had he encountered him. Balmer told police that he used two Molotov cocktails to set the residence on fire.

== Perpetrator ==
Balmer lived in Penbrook throughout his entire life, and was a student at Dauphin County Technical School during his early teenage years.

Balmer has an extensive criminal history across Dauphin County dating back to 2015. According to an affidavit from the Penbrook Police Department, officers were dispatched in January 2023 to a report of domestic violence in Balmer's residence. Balmer told officers he'd taken "a bottle full of pills" in a suicide attempt and then got into a fight with his wife and 13-year-old son, who had stepped between them.

According to his brother, Balmer had been diagnosed with bipolar disorder but rejected the diagnosis, often refusing to take his medication. He believed his sister-in-law to be a witch who cast a spell on him because she pressed him to get appropriate psychiatric care.

During his arrest, Balmer was transported to a local hospital for treatment after suffering a medical episode. Following Balmer's arrest, his mother Christie Balmer told CBS News that her son has schizophrenia and bipolar disorder and stated that he "went off his medication". Balmer struggled with mental illness throughout his life and was hospitalized twice.

Balmer was described by his brother as a political independent until 2024, when he tried to convince his family members to vote for Donald Trump. In a warrant to search Balmer's possessions issued after the incident, state police stated in their search warrant that Balmer had targeted Shapiro based on "perceived injustices toward the people of Palestine". In a 911 call previously made by Balmer, he characterized Shapiro as a "monster" who should stop having his friends killed, put his people "through too much" and said that he would not take part in Shapiro's "plans" for Palestinians. After the sentencing, "District Attorney Fran Chardo said at a news conference Tuesday that Balmer had expressed concern about the war in Gaza and somehow saw the attack as a response to deaths in that conflict."

On October 14, 2025, Balmer pleaded guilty to multiple charges, including attempted murder, terrorism, aggravated arson, and aggravated assault. Under a plea agreement, he was sentenced to 25 to 50 years in prison, with eligibility for parole beginning in April 2050. Balmer is currently incarcerated at State Correctional Institution – Camp Hill, located near Harrisburg.

== Responses ==
President Donald Trump said that Balmer was "probably just a whack job." On April 18, Shapiro cited "security failures" as a reason for the attack and said that he had not heard from Trump after the incident. On April 19, Trump made a phone call to Shapiro, which Shapiro described as "very gracious".

== See also ==
- 1917 Sacramento Governor's Mansion bombing
- 2020 shooting of Esther Salas' family
- 2020 Gretchen Whitmer kidnapping plot
- 2022 attack on Paul Pelosi
- 2025 shootings of Minnesota legislators
