= Naked marriage in China =

Marriage without the couple having a solid financial foundation

Naked marriage in China (Chinese: 裸婚), sometimes called "bare marriage", is a form of marriage that is undertaken without the couple having first accumulated a solid financial foundation. Typically it does not include a wedding, a ring, a house, a car or a honeymoon. The practice contrasts with the traditional Chinese custom of parents helping to provide the assets for their children's marriages. Naked marriage has become increasingly prevalent in China and is popular among people born in the country after the 1980s. It is generally recognized as a frugal way for loving partners to marry under the enormous economic pressure China's younger generation is facing in the 21st century.

== Causes ==
=== Social pressure ===
After the 2008 financial crisis, the popularity of naked culture soared in China. Because of the high cost of living and intense job competition, people born after the 1980s found it difficult to have a car, a house, or savings. Many of them have been forced to choose a naked marriage due to this harsh reality. Statistics have shown that, over 50% of the young people turning 30 cannot afford both a car and a house. Rapidly increasing house prices can make young people feel powerless and frustrated. In some cases, the only marriage option available to them is naked marriage. High house prices also reduce the overall marriage rates in China and consequent rates of fertility, as well as causing other serious social problems.

=== The pursuit of pure love ===
Traditionally, marriage in China has a basis in material possessions. However, some young couples choosing a naked marriage do so in pursuit of pure love, which they consider to be an important element in modern marriage. From their perspective, in a world fraught with material temptations, the key consideration for matchmaking has taken the wrong path in pursuing a sound economic base rather than pure love. In their love philosophy, it is pure love that can stand the test of time and be the bedrock of a successful marriage. In order to express an enthusiastic plea for pure love, they choose to get rid of superficial marital accessories, and this has given an impetus to the boom in naked marriage. Despite the public's seemingly favorable response to these values, however, many of the people surveyed reject the impulse to disavow all the traditional trappings of marriage.

=== The rise of self-cognition ===
Naked marriage can be said to be a product of the rebellious nature of China's younger generation on the topic of love. With an increasing awareness of self-cognition, young people of China grow to see themselves unique and independent with personal preferences. In terms of marital form, their choices manifest their intense internal beliefs under the pressure of external restrictions, as well as their eagerness for independence. In this materialistic society, it is common that the masses deem a stable economic condition a crucial factor of marriage. However, young people gradually come to their own realization that sustaining their beliefs can also lead to a happy marital life. Despite the lack of a house, car and luxury wedding, they believe that, what really counts is to determinedly follow their heart for the sake of happiness instead of compromising to the secular values of the society.

== Impacts ==
=== Equality in marriage ===
Men were previously considered as the "head of household", with exclusive power over their family. According to social conflict theory, the origin of household patriarchies comes from economic stratification. Owners of property have a definite advantage and men are more likely to have a higher income, hence obtaining a higher status in their family. For China's younger generation, couples are more likely to possess similar economic status and agree to strive together for a better life. This agreement birthed the idea of Naked Marriage, where couples are likely to share the same discourse and decision-making power when confronting critical issues, such as household decisions and distribution of possessions. Therefore, they may attain real equality in marriage. As supporters of Naked Marriage argue, it is the joint effort of life partners that constitute the most precious element of marriage.

=== Challenging the traditions ===
Lacking the necessities of a blessed marriage, Naked Marriage is a sharp contrast to the established Chinese marital customs. In traditional values, a couple can only get married when there is an economic precondition. The word "dowry" (Chinese: 彩禮、聘禮) is thus born to describe betrothal gifts from the bridegroom to the bride's family, which symbolizes a man's capability of providing a prosperous life for his wife. In China, the transfer of dowries has evolved into an indispensable process of marriage. Without a dowry transfer, Naked Marriage is tempestuously challenging the traditional values. The discrepancy in marital values is likely to cause family disharmony. Many parents strongly oppose Naked Marriage due to its lack of economic base, while China's youth often have a different idea. This conflict may give rise to family controversy, collision, or possibly even estrangement. This is an era when old and new ideas are in frequent conflict. Experts argue that even if traditions are still unshakable in many Chinese minds, it is evident that with the increasing acceptance of Naked Marriage, China's younger generation is becoming more and more open-minded.

=== Potential problems ===
In Chinese traditions, love and bread (i.e. livelihood) are considered as two cornerstones in marriage. Young couples choosing Naked Marriage appear Utopian since they are firmly convinced of love, which pertains to spiritual comfort, rather than economic and often materialistic foundations. However, some critics think that their lack of material basis may exacerbate stress and other relationship-related problems over time, leading to diminishing romantic feelings. The quote from ancient Chinese poet Yuan Zhen (Chinese: 元稹), "Everything goes wrong for the poor couple (Chinese: 貧賤夫妻百事哀)" is sometimes referenced in this regard. Consequently, their marriage may be vulnerable or even short-lived, which could lead to an increase in divorce rates.

== See also ==
- Marriage in modern China
- Social conflict theory
