= Mark K. Updegrove =

American historian

- Updegrove in 2026
- Born: August 25, 1961 (age 65); Abington, Pennsylvania, U.S.
- Education: Economics
- Alma mater: University of Maryland, College Park
- Occupations: Author, Historian, Journalist, Television Commentator, Presidential Library Director
- Spouse: Amy Banner Updegrove
- Writing career
- Subject: United States Presidency
- Notable work: Incomparable Grace: JFK in the Presidency

Mark K. Updegrove (born August 25, 1961) is an American author, historian, journalist, and a political analyst and the Presidential Historian for ABC News. He is the chairman and CEO of the LBJ Foundation in Austin, Texas. Previously, he served as the director of the Lyndon Baines Johnson Library and Museum for eight years.

He has interviewed seven U.S. Presidents and is the author of six books, including Make Your Mark: Lessons in Character from Seven Presidents, The Last Republicans: Inside the Extraordinary Relationship Between George H.W. Bush and George W. Bush, Second Acts: Presidential Lives and Legacies After the White House, and Incomparable Grace: JFK in the White House.

Updegrove is the host of the PBS show Live From the LBJ Library with Mark Updegrove, which is currently in its third season. Season 3 will feature Stacey Abrams, Alec Baldwin, Amy Coney Barrett, Noah Hawley, Richard Linklater, Vice President Mike Pence, Bruce Springsteen, Ringo Starr, and others.

== Background ==
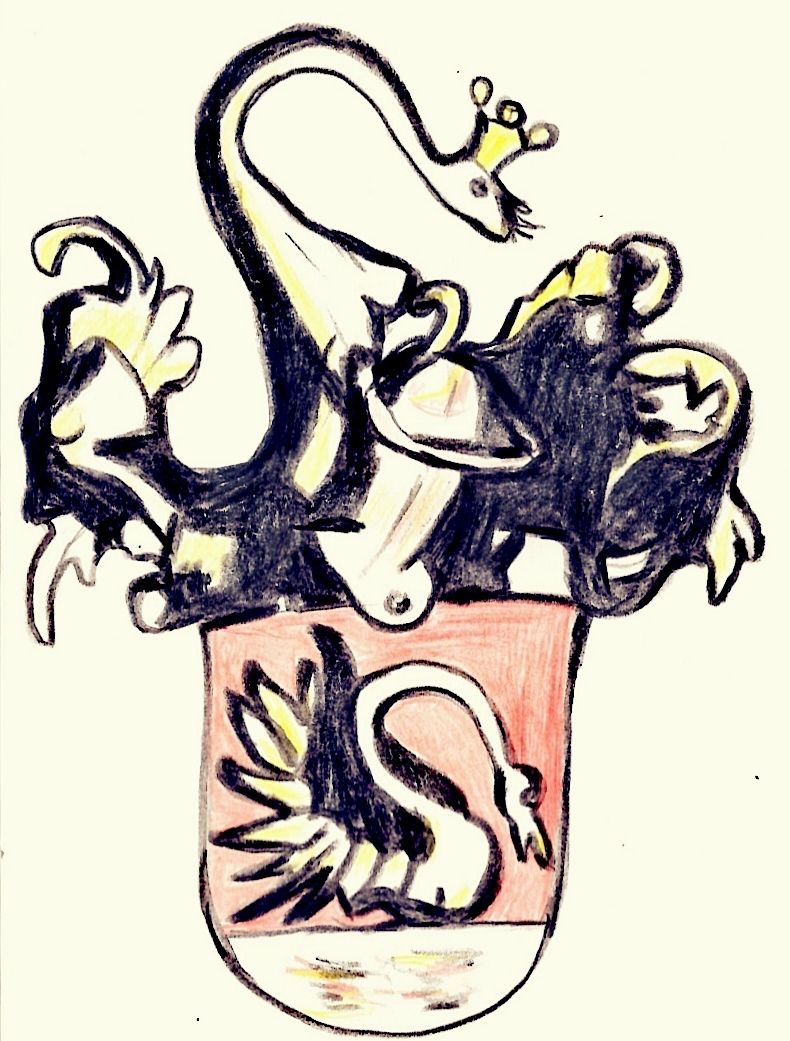
Possible, but not proven coat of arms Op den Graeff as descendants of Herman op den Graeff (Heraldic representation by Matthias Laurenz Gräff based on the Krefeld Op den Graeff stained glass window from 1630, which may depict the "Lohengrin swan" of the Kleve coat of arms in one window)

Mark K. Updegrove was born outside Philadelphia in Abington, PA, on Aug. 25, 1961. He descends from the Dutch and German Op den Graeff family. He was a direct descendant of Herman op den Graeff, mennonite leader of Krefeld, and his grandson Abraham op den Graeff, one of the founders of Germantown and in 1688 signer of the first protest against slavery in colonial America. Mark Updegrove attended high school at the George School, which honored him with its Distinguished Alumnus Award in 2015. In 1984, he graduated from the University of Maryland, College Park. In 2026, he received an honorary Doctorate of Humane Letters from Texas State University.

== Career ==
In May 2026, Updegrove was named the chairman and CEO of the LBJ Foundation in Austin, Texas. He served as president and CEO of the LBJ Foundation from 2018 to 2026, and from 2009 to 2017, he was the fourth director of the Lyndon Baines Johnson Presidential Library in Austin, Texas.

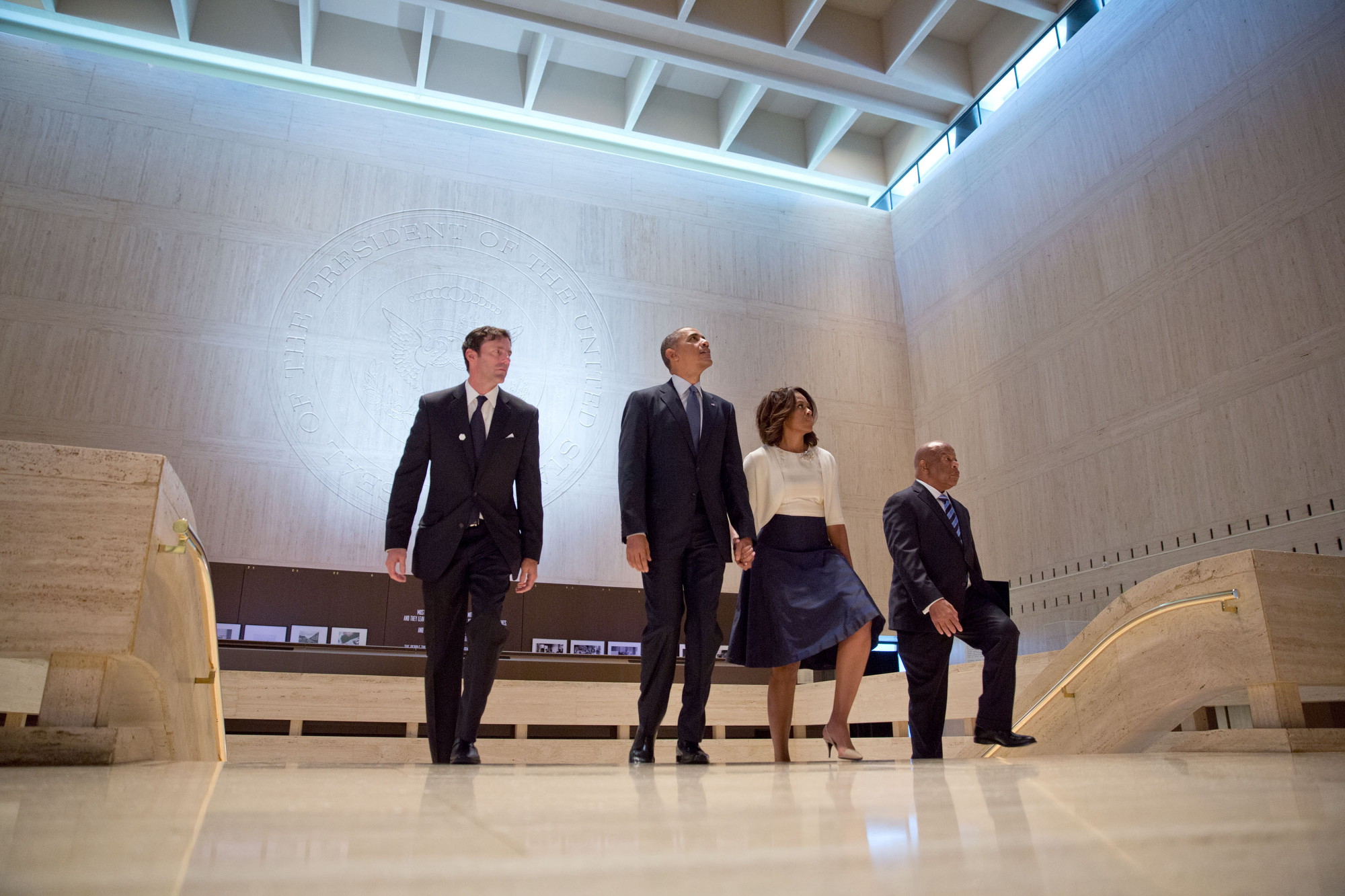
L-R: Updegrove with former President Barack Obama, former First Lady Michelle Obama, and John Lewis tour The Great Hall at the LBJ Presidential Library, April 10, 2014

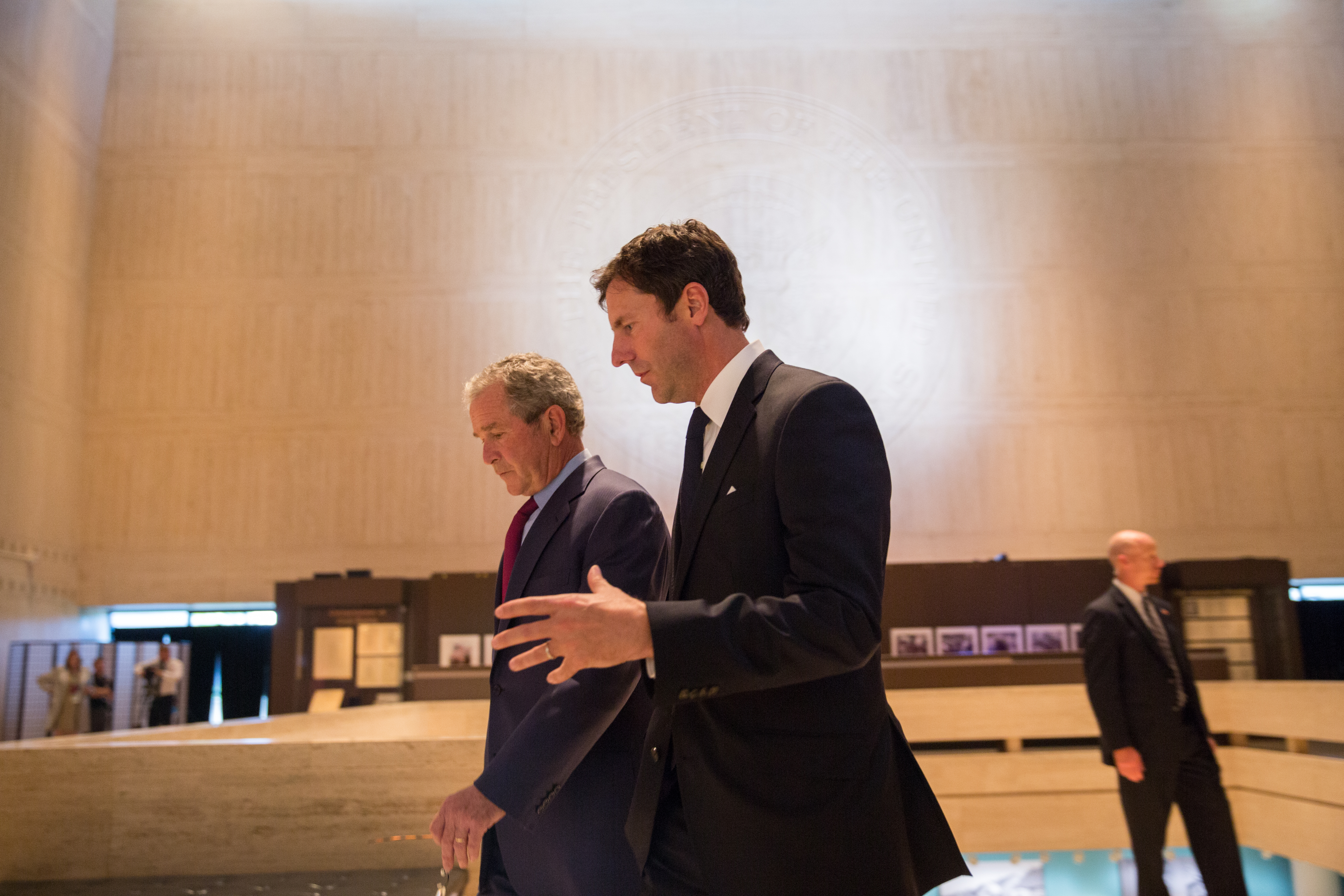
Former President George W. Bush arrives at the LBJ Presidential Library with Updegrove for the Civil Rights Summit, April 10, 2014

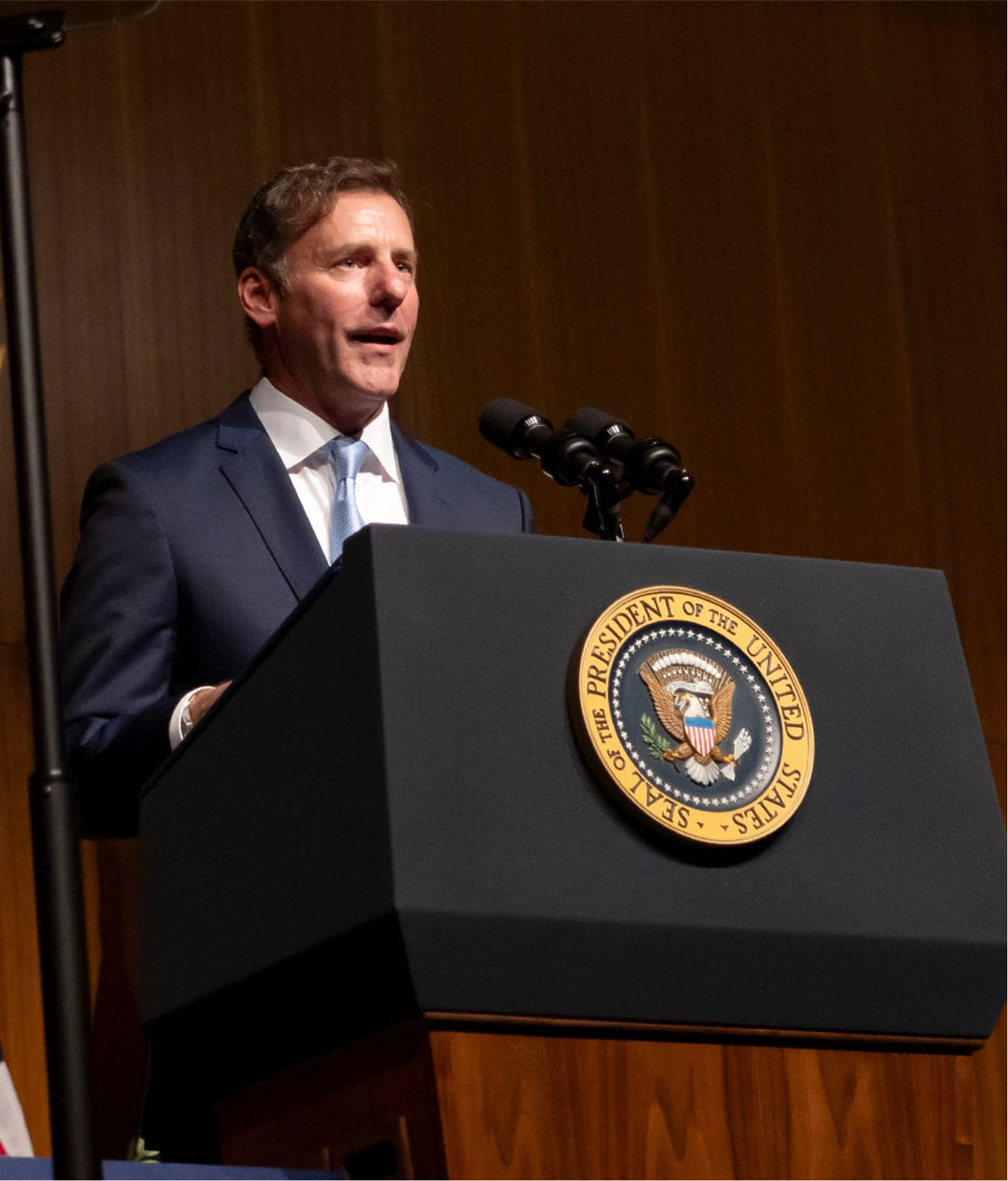
Updegrove introducing President Joe Biden at the LBJ Presidential Library, 2024

As director of the LBJ Library, in 2014, Updegrove hosted the Civil Rights Summit, an historic three-day conference around the fiftieth anniversary of the Civil Rights Act, which included a keynote address by then President Barack Obama and programs with former Presidents George W. Bush, Bill Clinton, and Jimmy Carter. The summit garnered international news coverage, including the New York Times profile on Updegrove titled, "Chronicler of Presidents Brings Four Together."

In July 2024, Updegrove hosted the 60th Anniversary of the Civil Rights Act Commemoration, during which President Biden offered keynote remarks.

Updegrove has conducted exclusive interviews with seven U.S. Presidents: Joe Biden, Barack Obama, George W. Bush, Bill Clinton, George H. W. Bush, Jimmy Carter, and Gerald R. Ford.

He has also interviewed First Ladies Laura Bush, Hillary Clinton, Barbara Bush, Nancy Reagan, and Rosalynn Carter; Vice Presidents Dick Cheney, Al Gore, Walter Mondale, and Mike Pence; Supreme Court Justices Sandra Day O'Connor, Ruth Bader Ginsburg, and Neil Gorsuch; Cabinet secretaries Henry Kissinger, James Baker, Madeleine Albright, Condoleezza Rice, Robert Gates, Eric Holder, and John Kerry; and others including: Mikhail Gorbachev, Nancy Pelosi, John Lewis, John Glenn, Dr. Anthony Fauci, Andrew Young, Julian Bond, Doris Kearns Goodwin, Dan Rather, Hank Aaron, Ken Burns, Bryan Cranston, Woody Harrelson, Rob Reiner, Willie Nelson, Robert Redford, and Bob Woodward, Carl Bernstein, Bruce Springsteen, and Ringo Starr.

Updegrove spent much of his early career in magazine publishing, including serving the publisher of Newsweek in New York, president of Time Canada, Time magazine's separate Canadian edition and operation, and Time magazine's Los Angeles manager.

He has received numerous awards, including the Distinguished Presidential Historian Award from the Society of Presidential Descendants, and he is a member of The Council on Foreign Relations and the Philosophical Society of Texas.

=== Books ===
Make Your Mark: Lessons in Character from Seven Presidents was published in April 2025. One of his previous books, The Last Republicans: Inside the Extraordinary Relationship Between George H.W. Bush and George W. Bush, was published in November 2017 with exclusive stories featured in the New York Times and on CNN, which reported on the book's revelations about the Bushes' views on Donald Trump. Through exclusive interviews with Updegrove, the book quotes former president George H.W. Bush as calling Donald Trump "a blowhard", and saying flatly, "I don't like him," while former president George W. Bush is quoted as saying, "Wow, this guy doesn't know what it means to be president." When asked for his reaction to the Bushes' comments, President Trump said, "I'll comment after we come back. I don't want to make headlines. I don't want to make their move successful." The book was addressed by Stephen Colbert in his monologue on The Late Show with Stephen Colbert.

Updegrove is the author of six books:

- Second Acts: Presidential Lives and Legacies After the White House (Lyons Press, 2006)
- Baptism By Fire: Eight Presidents Who Took Office During Times of Crisis (St. Martins Press, 2009)
- Indomitable Will: LBJ in the Presidency (Crown Publishers, 2012)
- The Last Republicans: Inside the Extraordinary Relationship Between George H.W. Bush and George W. Bush (HarperCollins, November 2017), which includes material from exclusive interviews with both Bush presidents
- Incomparable Grace: JFK in the Presidency (Dutton, 2022)
- Make Your Mark: Lessons in Character from Seven Presidents (HarperCollins, 2025)

=== Journalism ===
Updegrove has written for The Daily Beast, The Hill, The Nation, National Geographic, The New York Times, Parade, Politico, Texas Monthly, Time, and USA Today, and his books have been excerpted in American Heritage, Parade, Politico, and Texas Monthly.

Updegrove's December 2014 Politico article, What 'Selma' Gets Wrong, ignited a controversy over the portrayal of Lyndon Johnson as an obstructionist on voting rights in the film Selma, touching off a debate about the importance of accuracy in films based on historic events. In January 2015, Updegrove addressed the issue on CBS' Face the Nation.

=== Television Commentator ===
Updegrove is a political analyst and the Presidential Historian for ABC News. He also appears regularly on CNN and MS NOW, has contributed to CBS Sunday Morning, and has been a guest on all major news outlets including The CBS Evening News, Face the Nation, Morning Joe, NBC Nightly News, NPR's Morning Edition and All Things Considered, PBS NewsHour. He has also been on The Daily Show and played himself in the Epix series Graves.

Additionally, Updegrove has also appeared in numerous documentaries and original series including PBS' The White House: The Inside Story; In Pursuit: Lessons of American Leadership; CNN's The Bush Years, and Race for the White House; MSNBC's Betrayal: The Plot that Won the White House; NFL Films' Sigma Chi and the Mayflower Move / the Baltimore Colts; and History TV's Presidents at War, The Ultimate Guide to the Presidents, and What the Hell's the Presidency For? He is featured in CNN's 2022 original series, LBJ: Triumph and Tragedy, for which he served as executive producer.

=== Adjunct Professor/Lecturer ===
Along with Dr. Mark Lawrence, Updegrove co-teaches "The Johnson Years", a course for Liberal Arts Honors students at UT Austin.

Updegrove has lectured at numerous colleges and universities, including Harvard, Rice, the University of Virginia, and the University of Pennsylvania. He has also spoken at the Library of Congress, the National Archives, and the White House Historical Association.

== Personal life ==
Updegrove is married to Amy Banner Updegrove, an artist who formerly served as publisher of Texas Monthly, president of Los Angeles Magazine, and marketing director for Ralph Lauren. Both have two children from previous marriages. They live in Austin, Texas.
