= Attack on Paul Pelosi =

2022 assault in San Francisco, California

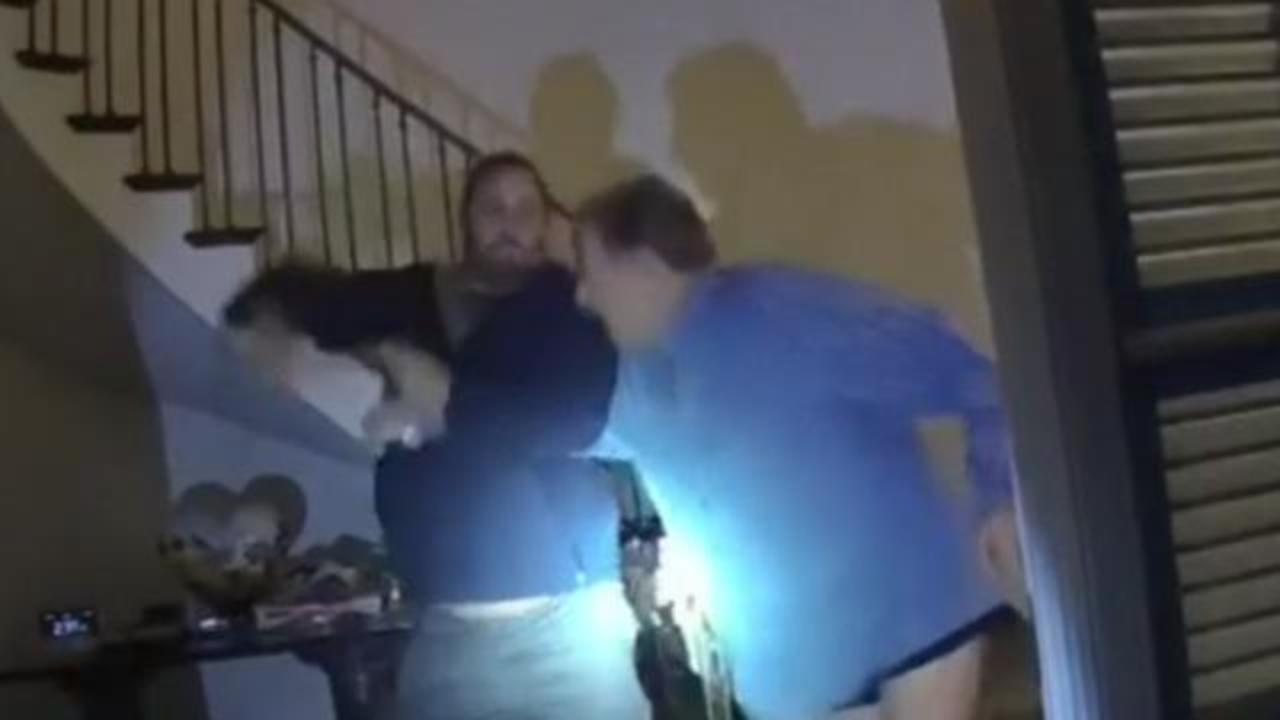
- DePape (left) preparing to hit Pelosi (right)
- Location: San Francisco, California, U.S.
- Date: October 28, 2022; 4 years ago c. 2:31 a.m. (PDT)
- Target: Nancy Pelosi
- Attack type: Attempted kidnapping, home invasion, assault with a deadly weapon
- Weapon: Hammer
- Injuries: 2 (including the perpetrator)
- Victim: Paul Pelosi (survived)
- Perpetrator: David Wayne DePape
- Motive: Desire to kidnap and interrogate Nancy Pelosi
- Verdict: Convicted on all federal counts and 5 state counts
- Convictions: 7 counts (Note: Federal: Attempted kidnapping of a federal official; Assaulting an immediate member of a federal official's family and inflicting a serious injury with a dangerous weapon; State: Threatening the family member of a public official; First-degree burglary; False imprisonment of an elder; Aggravated kidnapping; Preventing or dissuading a witness by force or threat)
- Sentence: Federal: 30 years in prison State: Life imprisonment without the possibility of parole

On October 28, 2022, 42-year-old David Wayne DePape attacked Paul Pelosi, the husband of Nancy Pelosi, the 52nd speaker of the United States House of Representatives. DePape beat Paul with a hammer during a home invasion of the couple's Pacific Heights, San Francisco, residence, leaving him with a fractured skull that required surgery.

San Francisco police arrested DePape at the scene. He planned to take Speaker Nancy Pelosi hostage and interrogate her. Prosecutors believed the attack to be politically motivated. DePape, a Canadian immigrant to the United States, had a history of mental health issues and drug abuse. Before the attack, he had embraced various far-right conspiracy theories, including QAnon, Pizzagate, and Donald Trump's false claims of a stolen election in 2020. Online, he made conspiratorial, racist, sexist, and antisemitic posts, and pushed COVID-19 vaccine misinformation. His blog also contained delusional thoughts. At his subsequent trial, DePape testified that he was motivated by conspiracy theories and had hatched a "grand plan" to target Speaker Pelosi and others.

On October 31, DePape was charged with two federal crimes: assault of an immediate family member of a federal official with the intent to retaliate against the official on account of the performance of official duties; and attempted kidnapping of a federal official on account of the performance of official duties. He was also charged with six state felonies, including attempted murder, residential burglary, assault with a deadly weapon, and elder abuse. Within days, prominent right-wing figures, including then-former president Donald Trump, shared disinformation and misinformation about the attack, casting doubt on the assailant's motives and claiming that the attack was a false flag operation. Other politicians, including Democrats and Republicans, condemned the attack.

DePape was convicted of the federal charges on November 16, 2023. On May 17, 2024, he was sentenced to 30 years in prison and five years of supervised release from the federal charges. DePape was also convicted of five state charges on June 21, 2024, and subsequently sentenced to life in prison without the possibility of parole on October 29, 2024.

== Break-in and attack ==
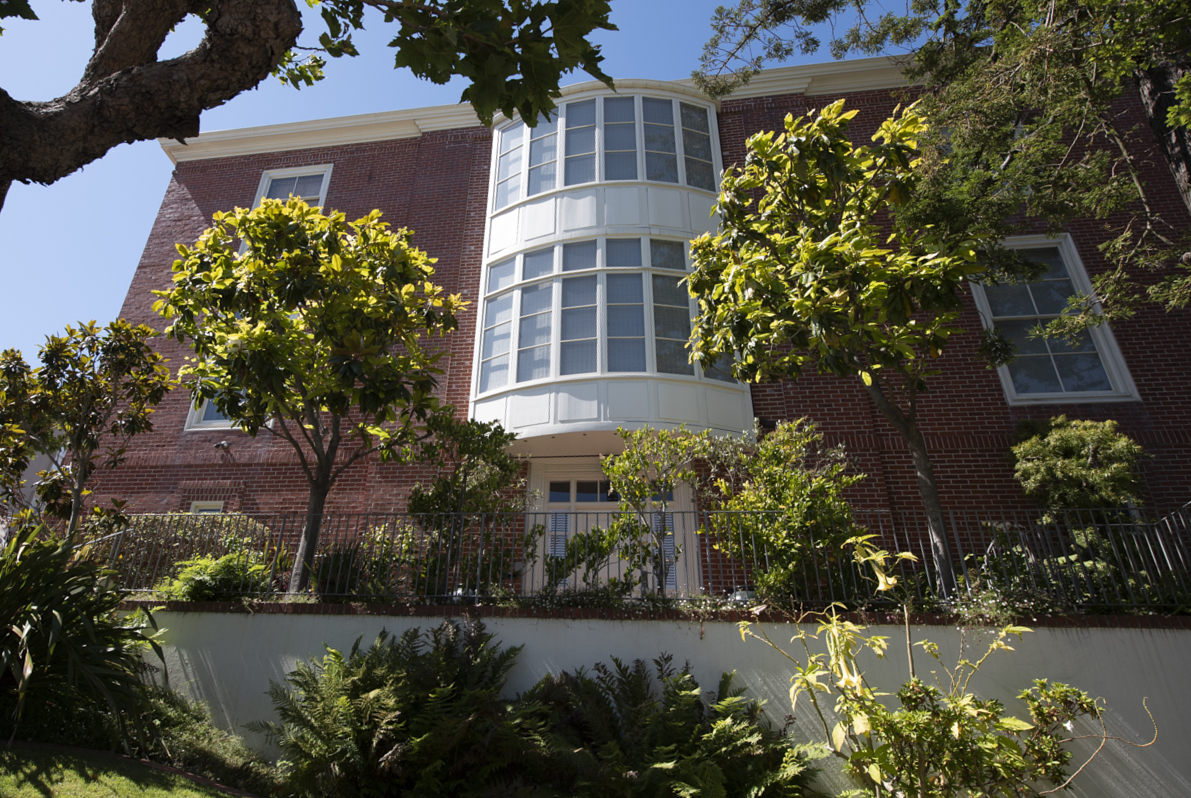
San Francisco home of Paul and Nancy Pelosi

During a police interview, David DePape said that he had gained access to the Pelosi residence by breaking through glass-paneled doors at the rear of the house. Subsequently released police body-worn camera footage showed the broken glass on the ground, and home surveillance video showed DePape breaking into the back of the house with repeated hammer blows. At the time of the break-in, Paul Pelosi, age 82, was sleeping in a third-floor bedroom. The intruder intentionally woke Pelosi and demanded to speak to "Nancy"; when Pelosi said that she was not home, the intruder said he would wait.

911 call from Pelosi shortly before the attack

Pelosi called 911 on his cellphone at 2:23 a.m. PDT but when prompted by the San Francisco Police 911 dispatcher Pelosi indicated he did not need police, fire, or medical. Pelosi later inquired about the presence of Capitol Police and relayed that a "gentleman" (DePape) was waiting for his wife Nancy Pelosi to return. The dispatcher then advises Pelosi to "call us back if you change your mind". Pelosi continues the conversation by sharing more detail about DePape's actions and demands. The dispatcher then makes a series of inquiries to clarify the situation. At one point, DePape participates in this exchange sharing his full name with the dispatcher. The call ends after Pelosi indicates DePape wants him "to get the hell off the phone" and thanks the dispatcher. The call prompted the 911 dispatcher to send police to Pelosi's aid for a wellness check, which was credited with saving his life.

Police body camera footage of the attack

San Francisco police officers quickly arrived at the Pelosi residence and knocked on the door at 2:31 a.m. Pelosi opened the door. From outside the house, police observed DePape and Pelosi struggling for a hammer at the entryway. In front of police, DePape took the hammer and attacked Pelosi with a single blow. Released body camera footage of San Francisco police officers showed the door opening as DePape struggled with Pelosi. DePape grasped a hammer in one hand and Pelosi's arm in another; after an officer commanded him to drop the hammer, DePape responded "uh, nope" and lunged at Pelosi, swinging the hammer into his head.

Police then tackled and arrested DePape. After arresting the intruder, police discovered multiple zip ties, duct tape, white rope, a second hammer, and rubber and cloth gloves in his backpack. According to investigators, DePape had a list of additional potential targets.

Following the attack, Pelosi underwent surgery to treat a skull fracture at the Zuckerberg San Francisco General Hospital. He also received treatment for serious injuries to his hands and right arm. Pelosi was released from the hospital on November 3. DePape was treated at the same hospital for minor injuries (specifically a dislocated shoulder); upon being discharged from the hospital, he was taken to the San Francisco County Jail.

Nancy Pelosi was in Washington, D.C., at the time of the attack. She rushed back to San Francisco on a government airplane, and a motorcade escorted her to the hospital where her husband was being treated. The following day, she wrote a "Dear Colleague" letter to members of the House of Representatives, saying that her extended family was "heartbroken and traumatized by the life-threatening attack" and thanking law enforcement, emergency services, and hospital staff for aiding her husband.

Paul Pelosi returned to public view over a month later, when he appeared with Nancy at the Kennedy Center Honors. He wore a hat and one glove to conceal his injuries. When asked by Anderson Cooper about her husband's condition in June 2024, over a year and a half after the attack, Nancy Pelosi replied, "He's making progress. He's about 80% there, physically. Traumatically, it's terrible."

== Investigation ==
The Federal Bureau of Investigation, the San Francisco Police Department, the United States Capitol Police (USCP), the U.S. Attorney's Office, and the San Francisco District Attorney's Office investigated the attack.

San Francisco District Attorney Brooke Jenkins said that the attack appeared to be politically motivated based on statements and comments made by DePape on the night of the attack.

After being Mirandized, DePape gave an interview to San Francisco Police Department officers in which he said he planned to hold Nancy hostage and that he saw her as the "leader of the pack" of lies told by the Democratic Party. He said that he considered himself to be fighting "tyranny" and likened himself to the American founding fathers. DePape told the police that he planned to kidnap and interrogate Nancy, and would break her kneecaps if she "lied" to him, believing that by doing so, "she would then have to be wheeled into Congress" as a "warning" to other members of Congress. He also told police that he was on a "suicide mission" and had additional targets in mind, naming California governor Gavin Newsom, actor Tom Hanks, and Hunter Biden—the son of then-president Joe Biden—as prospective targets.

The day after the attack, pursuant to a federal search warrant, investigators searched a garage in Richmond, California, where DePape had lived for the previous two years. Investigators reported seizing "two hammers, a sword, and a pair of rubber and cloth gloves" from the property.

Before the attack, DePape was not known to USCP and was not on any federal watchlist. USCP had access to security cameras outside the Pelosi home; the cameras—part of a network of approximately 1,800 cameras to which USCP has access—were installed eight years before the attack. The footage captured the assailant breaking the glass and entering the home. However, at the time of the attack, the USCP did not monitor the external video footage in real time when Pelosi was not home. She had received more violent threats than any other lawmaker and was accompanied by a security detail when traveling.

== Perpetrator ==
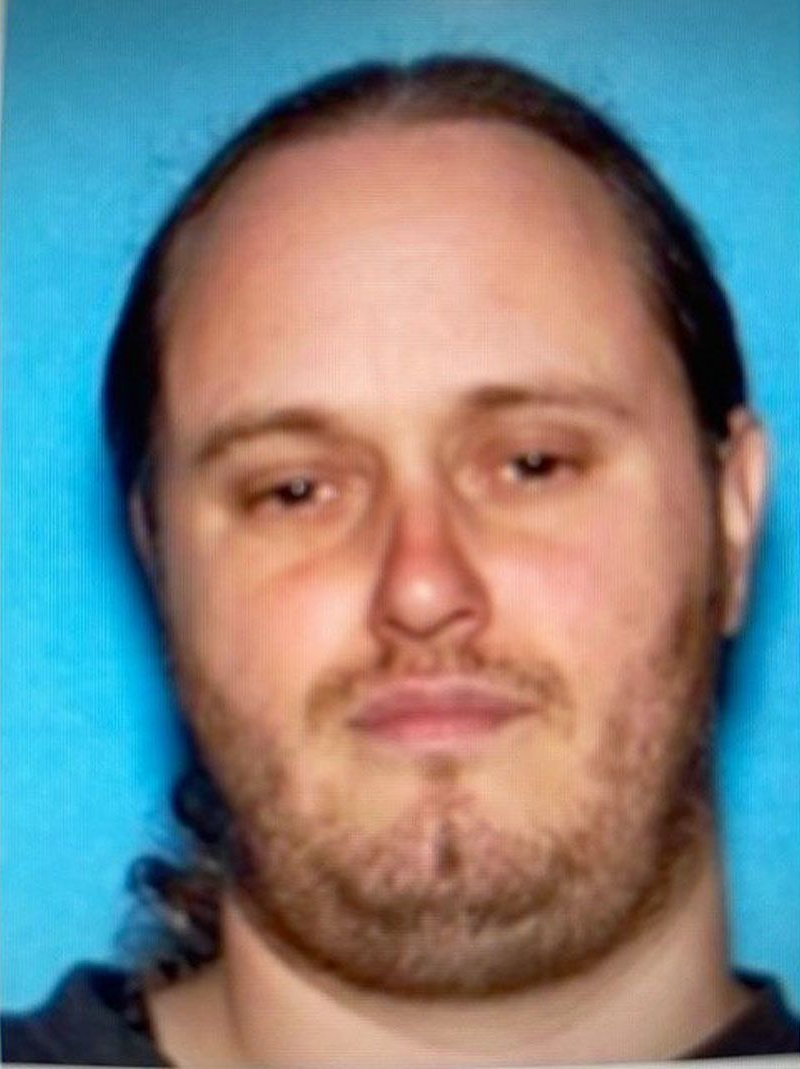
David DePape in a driver's license photograph

Canadian citizen David Wayne DePape, age 42, was arrested at the scene of the attack.

=== Life prior to the attack ===
DePape was born in 1980 and grew up in Powell River, British Columbia. At the time of the attack, he was present in the United States illegally, having overstayed his six-month temporary visitor B-2 visa issued in March 2008 when he entered at San Ysidro.

Shortly after finishing high school in Armstrong, he had migrated to the U.S. in 2000. In Hawaii, DePape met Gypsy Taub and moved with her to California. He became estranged from his family around that time. As Taub went on to become one the most prominent faces of the 2013 San Francisco public nudity movement, DePape remained a significant associate. Scott Wiener – a city supervisor in 2013, and later a state senator – described Taub and DePape as being part of a subgroup of "aggressive" and "creepy" public nudists, though DePape never appeared nude in public on grounds of being uncomfortable.

Taub said that she broke up with DePape in 2009; since then, his mental health had allegedly deteriorated from drug abuse and other causes. Taub described an incident from 2010 when DePape returned home after about a year of being incognito, identifying with Jesus, and exhibiting extreme paranoia. One acquaintance claimed to have had to cut off contact with DePape in 2012 after he displayed megalomaniac behavior and sent her multiple emails likening himself to Jesus Christ. Nonetheless, he remained part of Taub's circle and would even be the groomsman during her wedding in 2013; he continued to live in the same house with Taub, her spouse, and her three children. They rekindled their relationship at some point before permanently separating in 2015. DePape moved out and was homeless for a while; however, DePape and Taub remained intermittently in contact until Taub's incarceration.

At the time of the attack, he had been a resident of Richmond, California, for three years, living in a rented garage next to a home. In the six years prior to his arrest, he worked as a helper for a patio deck builder.

David's stepfather Gene DePape, who lived in Powell River at the time of the attack, told Global News that he hasn't seen his stepson since 2003, but was quiet and never violent as a child. He later disputed that David had gone to Pelosi's place with murderous intentions.

=== Social media activity ===
In 2007, DePape started a personal blog, initially writing about topics such as spirituality and the natural psychedelic ibogaine. In the months before the attack, DePape resumed writing on his blog after a long hiatus, this time on conspiracy theories and alt-right politics. In posts on social media and at least two blogs, DePape espoused far-right views, sharing political content and promoting QAnon, Pizzagate, and other conspiracy theories.

In 2021, DePape had posted videos by My Pillow CEO Mike Lindell that falsely claimed the 2020 U.S. presidential election to have been stolen; throughout 2022, he linked to COVID-19 vaccine misinformation videos – claiming that the vaccines were deadly and that data was covered up – and alleged that George Floyd had died of a drug overdose rather than being murdered by former officer Derek Chauvin. He credited Gamergate for making him shift in 2014 to right-wing politics. He also expressed a fascination for conservative authors Jordan Peterson and James A. Lindsay. One month before the attack, a website written under DePape's name declared that any journalist who challenged Trump's election fraud claims "should be dragged straight out into the street and shot". DePape also attacked Jews, immigrants, people of color, women, LGBTQ people, social justice warriors, Catholics, and Muslims. He promoted a range of antisemitic conspiracy theories, including proclaiming the innocence of Adolf Hitler, denying the Holocaust, and accusing Jews of orchestrating the 2022 Russian invasion of Ukraine. His online posts were also often delusional, once attacking Jesus as "the antichrist" and included references to communication with invisible fairies and the occult. His last post, published a day before the attack, was titled "Why Colleges are becoming Cults".

Party affiliation records note DePape to be a Green Party member as of 2014; according to Taub, he was "more on the far left than the far right" during their relationship. Experts on extremism and terrorism say that such shifts in views – from left-wing fringe movements to the far-right – can be held as "side switching", a fairly common phenomenon among persons who are radicalized online, who shift between "mutually exclusive or hostile ideologies" through "bridging areas" such as antisemitism, anti-government stance, and misogynist beliefs.

== State and federal prosecution ==
On October 31, 2022, federal prosecutors charged DePape with "attempted kidnapping of a federal official in the performance of official duties" and "assaulting an immediate member of a federal official's family and inflicting a serious injury with a dangerous weapon", On November 9, a federal grand jury indicted him on the same two charges. On November 3, U.S. Immigration and Customs Enforcement lodged an immigration detainer on DePape, who is a Canadian national, intending on taking custody of DePape after he is released from custody and making it possible to deport him.

On October 31, the San Francisco District Attorney's Office filed state charges against DePape, including six felonies: attempted murder, residential burglary, elder abuse, assault with a deadly weapon, false imprisonment of an elder, and threatening the family member of a public official. If convicted of all state charges, DePape faced a sentence of between 13 years and life imprisonment. On November 4, he was denied bail. A preliminary hearing was heard December 14. DePape pleaded not guilty to both the federal and state charges.

On January 27, 2023, video and audio recordings of the attack were publicly shown in a preliminary court hearing in San Francisco Superior Court. The court ordered the district attorney's office to release the materials, granting a motion filed by a coalition of news organizations seeking release. (Note: The press organizations who successfully won the motion to release the videorecording included the Associated Press; several newspapers (The New York Times, Washington Post, Los Angeles Times, San Francisco Chronicle, Press Democrat); the major television networks (CNN, Fox News, CBS, ABC, and NBC); and KQED Inc., which operates San Francisco's NPR member station. DePape's lawyers argued against the release of the materials, contending it would damage DePape's right to a fair trial.) The released files included the audio of DePape's police interview, the recording of the 911 call made by Pelosi just prior to the attack, the responding police officer's body-cam footage (clearly showing the attack and ensuing struggle), and home surveillance video, in which DePape is seen breaking-into the back of the house with repeated hammer blows.

=== Federal trial ===
DePape's federal trial began on November 9, 2023. In their opening statement, DePape's defense lawyers admitted that he carried out the attack, but argued that he was motivated by his belief in "conspiracy theories" rather than Pelosi's position as speaker.

Witnesses who gave evidence at the trial included the San Francisco PD officers who responded to the scene, FBI agents, and Capitol Police officers; Paul Pelosi himself also testified about the attack, his recovery, and the lingering emotional, mental and physical effects from his injuries. Additional medical testimony was given by the neurosurgeon who operated on Pelosi following the attack.

DePape himself also chose to testify. He admitted that he had attacked Pelosi, saying that Speaker Pelosi (and not her husband) was his actual target. He admitted to hitting Pelosi "with full force" using the hammer. DePape testified that he had been radicalized beginning in 2014, when he became interested in Gamergate and started listening to right-wing podcasters, and "culture war stuff" on YouTube in his spare time. He testified that he frequently listened to James A. Lindsay, Glenn Beck, Tim Pool, and Jimmy Dore. He recalled listening to podcasts and YouTube videos for at least six hours a day, on weekdays, and for the duration of entire weekends. Influenced by QAnon-like conspiracy theories, DePape ultimately plotted a "grand plan" to lure "targets"—including political figures as varied as Gavin Newsom, Adam Schiff, Mike Pence, Bill Barr, Bernie Sanders, and George Soros, actor Tom Hanks, and university professor Gayle Rubin, in addition to Nancy Pelosi. He testified that he believed the mainstream media "were all lying about Trump", that he planned to wear a unicorn costume while "interrogating" Speaker Pelosi (and then uploading the video publicly), and that he planned to ultimately target Hunter Biden, President Joe Biden's son. DePape testified that he was "surprised and confused" to find that Speaker Pelosi was not at home, and considered his plans to be "basically ruined" at that point. He also said that he regretted hurting Paul Pelosi because he felt they had had a "good rapport."

On November 16, the jury found DePape guilty of both federal counts. The Justice Department was seeking 40 years imprisonment followed by eight years of supervised release, after his incarceration is completed. On May 17, 2024, DePape was ultimately sentenced to 30 years in prison followed by five years of supervised release.

During sentencing, the judge erred in not providing the defendant an opportunity to make a statement. Another sentencing hearing was held on May 28, 2024, during which, DePape apologized for his actions. Again, he was sentenced to 30 years in prison.

=== State trial ===
After several delays, DePape's state trial began on May 29, 2024. Evidence admissible in the state case included the police body camera footage of the attack, DePape's confession to police, and his "rambling and conspiracy-filled testimony" from his federal trial.

On June 6, 2024, the judge dismissed charges of attempted murder, assault with a deadly weapon and elder abuse, finding that trying DePape on these charges following the federal trial would constitute double jeopardy. On June 21, DePape was found guilty of five state charges: burglary, false imprisonment, threatening a family member of a public official, kidnapping, and threatening a witness. He was sentenced on October 29 to life in prison without parole.

=== Post-sentencing and incarceration ===
After his sentencing, DePape's father Gene issued an apology statement to both Paul and Nancy on an article from the Los Angeles Times. David DePape began serving his sentence at the California Correctional Institution in Tehachapi, California on November 21, 2024.

== Reactions ==
President Joe Biden expressed support for the Pelosi family and said there was too much political violence, hatred, and vitriol. Biden compared the attack on Paul Pelosi with the January 6 Capitol attack and said Republicans talking about "stolen elections" and "COVID being a hoax" may "affect people who may not be so well balanced". Vice President Kamala Harris blamed the current political climate for inspiring the attack. California Governor Gavin Newsom said the "heinous attack" on Pelosi was "yet another example of the dangerous consequences of the divisive and hateful rhetoric that is putting lives at risk and undermining our very democracy." San Francisco Mayor London Breed called the attack a "horrific and scary incident", offering her support to Pelosi's family and thanking the first responders. The attack and broader concerns of violence and threats prompted calls from members of Congress to increase security. Canadian Prime Minister Justin Trudeau said on Twitter that "the attack on Paul Pelosi is appalling and completely unacceptable, and I condemn this violence in the strongest possible terms."

The attack on Pelosi was condemned by Democratic Senate Majority Leader Chuck Schumer (who called it "a dastardly act"); Republican Senate Minority Leader Mitch McConnell (who said that the assault "horrified and disgusted" him); by Republican House Minority Whip Steve Scalise (who was seriously wounded in the 2017 congressional baseball shooting, and who called the attack on Pelosi "horrific"); Republican House Minority Leader Kevin McCarthy, and Republican Senate Minority Whip John Thune. (Note: Outgoing Representative Liz Cheney wrote, "Reports about the brutal attack on Paul Pelosi are horrific and deeply troubling." The attack was condemned by, among others, Senators Bernie Sanders (I-VT) and Ted Cruz (R-TX). Cruz, however, later retweeted conspiracy theories about the attack (asserting that "none of us will ever know for sure" what happened at the Pelosi residence), and complained that the attack was being used to criticize Republicans.)

Republican officials sent mixed messages on the attack, prompting criticism from Democrats. Many Republicans denounced the attack, though others spread conspiracy theories about it. Some Republicans who condemned the attack issued statements criticizing "both sides" for violent rhetoric and political violence. Few Republicans spoke out against colleagues who spread conspiracy theories before the attack on Pelosi, or who promoted conspiracy theories about the attack itself. Top Republican officials, such as Republican National Committee Chair Ronna McDaniel and National Republican Congressional Committee Chair Tom Emmer, rejected assertions that inflammatory Republican rhetoric, including vilification of Nancy Pelosi, contributed to an atmosphere that risked violence. A week before the attack, Emmer posted a video of himself firing a gun with the hashtag #FirePelosi; after the attack, he deflected a question asking if he should have used a gun in the ad. Some Republicans made jokes about the attack. When taunting Nancy Pelosi, Donald Trump, the 45th and 47th president of the United States, sarcastically asked, “How's her husband doing?” He then remarked, “She's against building a wall in our border, even though she has a wall around her house—which obviously didn't do a very good job.” Glenn Youngkin, the Republican governor of Virginia, said, "There's no room for violence anywhere, but we're gonna send Nancy Pelosi back to be with him in California", a remark that attracted controversy. Afterwards, Youngkin sent a handwritten apology to Speaker Pelosi's office, which she accepted. Kari Lake, the Republican candidate for governor of Arizona joked about the attack while campaigning, saying to a laughing crowd "Nancy Pelosi, well, she's got protection when she's in D.C. - apparently her house doesn't have a lot of protection" while urging protection at schools just like the ones available for federal lawmakers.

Former Republican National Committee communications strategist Doug Heye expressed concern that intense rhetoric against Nancy Pelosi and other politicians had reached the point of inspiring violence. Heye noted his own past involvement in rhetoric against Nancy Pelosi, having been heavily involved in the Republican National Committee's "Fire Pelosi" campaign ahead of the 2010 House elections.

Newsom, during an interview with CBS News' Major Garrett, accused Fox News for "creating a culture" that led to the attack, due to comments made by Jesse Watters during his show Jesse Watters Primetime.

Speaker Pelosi, during an interview with CNN's Dana Bash, later commented that the Republican Party's performance in the 2022 midterm elections, widely described as a disappointment for the Republicans, was partly due to voters being turned off at what she described as their "horrible response" to the attack.

=== Misinformation and disinformation ===
Prominent right-wing figures shared misinformation and disinformation about the attack. Within days of the attack, such claims had spread among the Republican mainstream. The New York Times noted that the claims "appeared intended to deflect attention from Mr. DePape's views". Right-wing figures who spread misinformation about the attack included Roger Stone, Dinesh D'Souza, and Steve Bannon, all of whom implied that the attack could be a "false flag".

Some of the misinformation that circulated was based on homophobia, by implying that DePape and Pelosi were somehow sexually involved. Elon Musk, following his acquisition of Twitter, shared a tweet with an article from a right-wing fake news website, falsely suggesting that the attack resulted from a drunken Paul Pelosi having a fight with a male prostitute. Musk deleted his tweet hours later, after it had amassed 24,000 retweets and 86,000 likes.

Republican congressman Clay Higgins (of Louisiana), Republican congresswomen Marjorie Taylor Greene (of Georgia), and Claudia Tenney (of New York), as well as Donald Trump Jr. and David Clarke Jr., all disseminated false claims about the attack, including those that Pelosi knew the attacker or was involved in male prostitution. Referring to various conspiracies, conservative talk radio host Charlie Kirk called for an "amazing patriot" from among his audience to "be a midterm hero" by deciding to "bail out" DePape "and then go ask him some questions". Days after the attack, former president Donald Trump also spread false conspiracy theories about the attack, suggesting it could have been staged. Some right-wing pundits depicted the attack on Pelosi as a random crime, blaming Democrats for it, rather than a targeted assault. Some spreaders of misinformation seized on early inaccurate reporting by some news outlets in the immediate aftermath of the attack; despite the outlets providing corrections, these reports fueled baseless conspiracy theories that went viral online and in right-wing circles. Trump Jr. responded to a tweet making fun of Pelosi about a Halloween "costume" of just a hammer and a pair of white briefs, writing, "The Internet remains undefeated."

Philip Bump, a columnist for The Washington Post, wrote that misinformed narratives about the event either focused on "what Democrats are doing wrong, instead of having to talk about where right-wing rhetoric is problematic" or portrayed "Democratic leaders not as actual targets of violence but, instead, as the real wrongdoers". Bump wrote that these false narratives gained popularity among right-wing users on social media, where there was "an audience for extreme conspiracy theories"; "an infrastructure for vetting and promoting them"; and "very little interest in self-correcting".
