= Vance Boelter =

American murderer (born 1967)

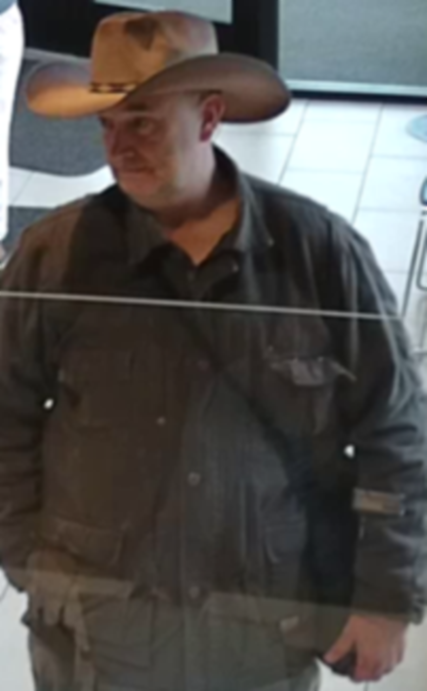
- Boelter in 2025
- Born: Vance Luther Boelter; July 23, 1967 (age 59); Sleepy Eye, Minnesota, U.S.
- Known for: Perpetrator of the 2025 shootings of Minnesota legislators
- Political party: Republican (since 2004)
- Spouse: Jenny Lynne (m. 1997; div. 2025)
- Children: 5
- Sentence: Federal: Two consecutive life sentences without the possibility of parole plus 40 years
- Status: Incarcerated
- Motive: Shift the balance of power in the Minnesota legislature
- Convictions: 6 counts (Note: Federal: Stalking using interactive computer service (2 counts); Use of a firearm to murder in relation to stalking (2 counts); Discharge of a firearm in relation to stalking (2 counts))
- Criminal charges: 7 counts (Note: State: First-degree premeditated murder (2 counts); Attempted first-degree murder (4 counts); Felony cruelty to an animal; Impersonating a police officer)

Details
- Date: June 14, 2025; 17 months ago
- Locations: Brooklyn Park and Champlin, Minnesota, U.S.
- Target: Democratic legislators
- Killed: 2
- Injured: 2
- Weapon: Beretta 92

Vance Luther Boelter (born July 23, 1967) is an American murderer who assassinated state representative Melissa Hortman, her husband, and their dog at their home in Brooklyn Park, Minnesota, on June 14, 2025. He also shot state senator John Hoffman and his wife at their home in nearby Champlin, leaving them seriously injured and hospitalized. He then escaped, sparking the most extensive manhunt in Minnesota history.

The following day, Boelter was found hiding in a field near his Green Isle home roughly 50 mi (80 km) southwest of Minneapolis. He was arrested and charged with a total of 13 federal and state charges, including murder, stalking, and firearms offenses. On June 11, 2026, Boelter pleaded guilty to all the federal charges. On July 23, 2026, Boelter was sentenced to two concurrent life sentences without the possibility of parole. Boelter said he planned the attacks alone, over a period of several months.

== Early life and education ==
Vance Luther Boelter was born in Sleepy Eye, Minnesota. He began attending Sleepy Eye High School as an eighth grader in 1980, graduating in 1985. In 1996, he left Minnesota and resided in Arcadia, Wisconsin.

On October 4, 1997, Boelter married his wife, Jenny Lynne, in Winona, Minnesota, and they moved several times during the 2000s. Boelter left Wisconsin in 2002 and resided in the small Eastern Oklahoma town of Muldrow. In 2005, he briefly left Oklahoma for Minnesota before buying a house in Sheboygan, Wisconsin. Boelter owned the family's Muldrow home from 2002 to 2007 and the Sheboygan home from 2005 to 2013. He attended Cardinal Stritch University from 2008 to 2010. In 2020, he purchased property in Pierson, Iowa, including a century-old church that had been converted to a home for $20,000. In 2024, he and his wife sold the property for $60,000.

== Career ==
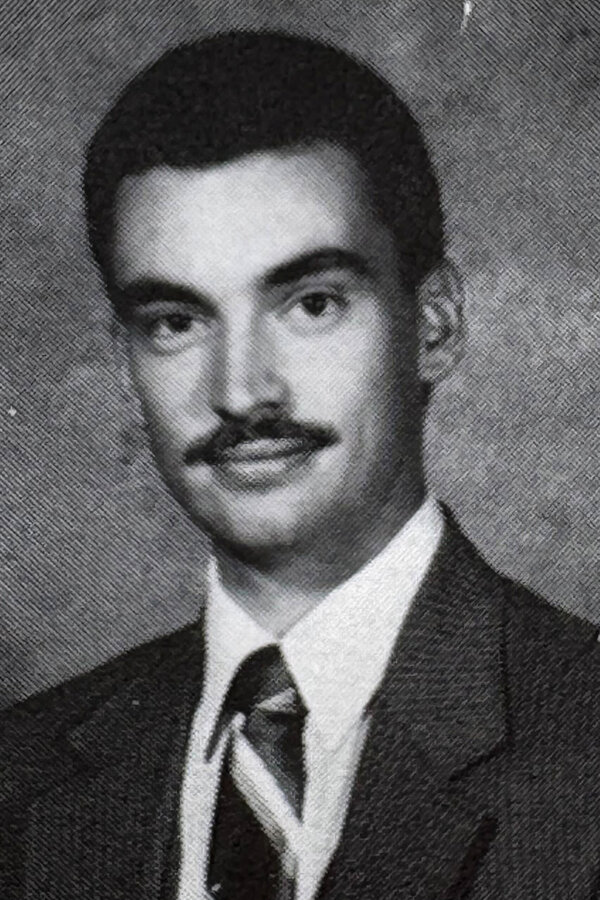
Boelter in a 1989 Christ for the Nations Institute yearbook

In 1988, Boelter left Minnesota for several years when he was enrolled as a student at Christ for the Nations Institute in Dallas, Texas.

Upon graduating from the Christ for the Nations Institute in 1990, Boelter returned to Minnesota to live with his father in Richmond, Minnesota. Boelter enrolled as a student at St. Cloud State University and graduated in 1996 with a degree in international relations.

While living in Muldrow in 2002, Boelter served as a supervisor at a Gerber Products Company plant in Fort Smith, Arkansas. A senior pastor from Springdale called Boelter "always very kind, gentle, patient, and gracious with people". In late 2004, Boelter left Gerber for a job at Johnsonville Foods' Sheboygan headquarters. In April 2008, he left Johnsonville and returned to Sleepy Eye. He worked as a production coordinator at Del Monte Foods there until 2011.

Boelter later went back to school and earned a master's degree and then a doctorate in leadership from the now-closed Cardinal Stritch University in Milwaukee County, Wisconsin. In July 2011, after leaving Del Monte, Boelter moved to Shakopee, Minnesota, where he served as general manager for Greencore until April 2016. That month, he became general manager of a southwestern Minneapolis 7-Eleven store until November 2021. Shortly before Boelter bought his Green Isle, Minnesota, farmhouse in October 2023, Boelter began mortuary science courses at Des Moines Area Community College. In August 2023, Vance received his last employments at two Minnesota funeral homes, one in Savage and one in Saint Paul, removing bodies from houses and nursing homes for organ donation, jobs he quit in February 2025.

On social media, Boelter claimed to have military training and a career in private security, but National Public Radio found "no history working in law enforcement, the military or private security". A friend of Boelter's said he made claims about his life that were "fantasy". His company, Praetorian Guard Security Services, was registered with the state to his home address and listed him as "the director of security patrols", but there is no record the company ever had any clients. The company said it had a fleet of "police type vehicles"—the same SUVs police use. Boelter had security ties to his own former company, Souljer Security, that was registered to a church he owned while living in Arcadia, Wisconsin, in the late 1990s. He previously worked as a gas station manager before starting a company called Red Lion Group in the Democratic Republic of the Congo (DRC). Archives from the Wisconsin Department of Financial Institutions show that his company was first established on November 15, 1999, and was dissolved on May 12, 2010. According to Forbes, he had financial problems since beginning the business in the DRC. While living in Sheboygan, Boelter and his wife founded an evangelical nonprofit, Revoformation Ministries, and he claimed to have "sought out militant Islamists" in the West Bank and Gaza during the Second Intifada "to share the gospel and tell them that violence wasn't the answer".

Boelter preached more than once in Centre Évangélique Francophone La Borne, a church in Matadi, DRC, speaking against abortion rights and transgender people. The church stated that Boelter was only a visiting guest speaker and not a missionary or pastor for the congregation. He appeared as a speaker at a 2022 seminar on trade and investment organized by Minnesota Africans United, a nonprofit for African immigrants in Minnesota. In 2016, he was appointed to the Governor's Workforce Development Board, a nonpartisan 60-member unpaid advisory board, by then-Governor of Minnesota Mark Dayton. Governor Tim Walz reappointed him to a four-year term in 2019. Boelter's only prior legal troubles were minor traffic violations.

== 2025 shootings of Minnesota legislators ==
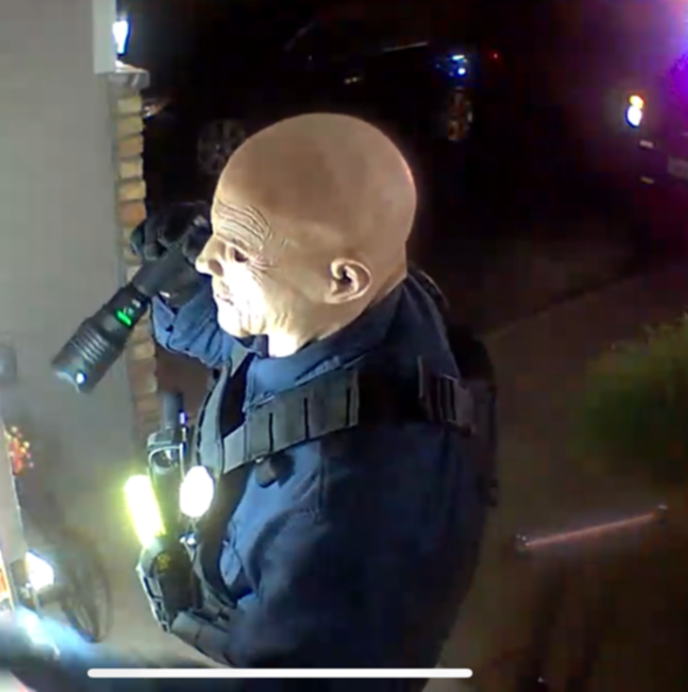
Boelter upon arriving at the Hortman residence, wearing a mask

Boelter arrived at the Hoffman residence in Champlin shortly before 2 a.m. CDT (UTC−5) on June 14, 2025. He knocked on the door, shouting that he was a police officer. As the Hoffmans opened the door, he asked if they had weapons. John Hoffman shouted "You're not a cop" and attempted to push Boelter out the door; Boelter said "this is a robbery" and repeatedly shot both of them. At 2:06 a.m., police in Champlin responded to an emergency call from the Hoffmans' adult daughter, Hope; they found Hoffman and his wife, Yvette, with gunshot wounds. John Hoffman was shot nine times and Yvette eight times. According to Hope, her parents pushed her out of the way to protect her from Boelter, and while she sustained minor injuries when her body slammed into their washing machine, she was not struck by bullets.

According to acting United States Attorney for Minnesota Joseph H. Thompson, Boelter next went to state representative Kristin Bahner's house in Maple Grove, where he rang the doorbell. Bahner, on vacation with her family, was not at home and Boelter left. Soon thereafter, he parked near state senator Ann Rest's residence in New Hope. New Hope police had heard about the Hoffmans' shooting and dispatched an officer to perform a wellness check on Rest. The officer arrived at Rest's house at 2:36 a.m. and saw Boelter's black SUV parked down the street. Believing him to be a colleague also sent to protect Rest, the officer tried to talk to Boelter, but he did not respond. The officer continued to Rest's house. Boelter left New Hope and went to the Hortman residence in Brooklyn Park.

Boelter arrived at the Hortman residence at about 3:30 a.m, still impersonating a police officer and wearing a silicone face mask and wig. He knocked on the door and told Mark Hortman, who answered, that he was performing a welfare check, shining a flashlight in Hortman's eyes. Two Brooklyn Park police officers, alerted by their colleagues in Champlin to the shooting, went to check on the Hortmans. They arrived at the Hortman home at 3:35 a.m. and saw what appeared to be a police vehicle in the driveway. Brooklyn Park chief of police Mark Bruley said the vehicle "looked exactly like an SUV squad car".

As the officers approached the Hortman residence, they saw Boelter, wearing a realistic silicone mask (an old man disguise), a full police uniform (including body armor), a badge, and standard police gear. Boelter then drew his gun and shot at Mark Hortman and the officers, who returned fire. Boelter then "charged forward" into the house. Security camera footage indicated that he then proceeded to shoot Melissa Hortman as she attempted to flee upstairs. The police moved Mark from the threshold of the home and he was pronounced dead shortly thereafter. A drone was used to enter the residence, where Melissa Hortman's body was found. More officers were called to the scene, surrounding the house, and a SWAT team arrived. Boelter escaped on foot. Officers did not enter the house until 4:38 a.m., over an hour later, against the department's policy on confronting active shooters.

=== Motive ===
Boelter's appointment as Private Sector Representative by Mark Dayton in 2016

Federal charging documents described Boelter as acting with "the intent to kill, injure, harass, and intimidate Minnesota legislators". His anti-abortion views are a possible motive. Boelter was registered to vote in Oklahoma as a Republican for the 2004 United States presidential election, although on a state document in 2019 he wrote that he had "no party preference". A longtime Sleepy Eye, Minnesota resident who knew Boelter since he was a fourth-grade student in his childhood town in 1976 told reporters he was stunned to learn that Boelter was a suspect in the attacks. He described Boelter as "a conservative who voted for President Donald Trump and was strongly against abortion rights", and said Boelter was having financial problems and struggling to find work, adding that "he was looking around but immediately gave up and decided to go out in the blaze of glory" and saying that "there was darkness inside of him". Boelter's wife told investigators their family "prepared for major or catastrophic incidents" and that, after the shootings, he warned her by text message that "they should prepare for war, they needed to get out of the house and people with guns may be showing up to the house".

An unmarked black fifth-generation Ford Explorer (Police Interceptor Utility) equipped with an orange and white LED lightbar was left in the Hortmans' driveway and contained a list of about 70 potential targets, including "abortion providers, pro-abortion rights advocates, and lawmakers in Minnesota, Wisconsin, and other states". Hortman and Hoffman were on the list, as were State Representatives Kristin Bahner and Erin Koegel, State Senators Erin Maye-Quade and Ann Rest, U.S. representatives Angie Craig, Ilhan Omar, Rashida Tlaib, Mark Pocan, Gwen Moore, Kelly Morrison, and Hillary Scholten, U.S. senators Amy Klobuchar, Tina Smith, and Tammy Baldwin, Minnesota Lieutenant Governor Peggy Flanagan, Minnesota Governor Tim Walz, and Minnesota Attorney General Keith Ellison. Boelter later said he intended to kill "as many lawmakers as possible".

On the day of the shooting, Boelter texted friends: "I love you guys. I've made some choices, and you guys don't know anything about this, but I'm going to be gone for a while. I may be dead shortly." The police found AK-style firearms in his vehicle. Also in his car was a stack of flyers for the No Kings protests to be held on the day of the shooting. Police said they believed Boelter may have intended to target the protests, sparking cancellations.

In a letter addressed to the FBI, Boelter claimed that Governor Walz instructed him to kill multiple officials, especially Klobuchar, to allow Walz to run for her Senate seat. The letter was left in a car that Boelter had deserted near his house, along with his confession to shooting the Hortmans and Hoffmans. People with knowledge of the letter who spoke to the Star Tribune described it as rambling, incoherent, and conspiratorial. United States Attorney for Minnesota Joseph H. Thompson called Boelter's accusation a "fantasy" likely intended to excuse his crimes and misdirect the investigation. As he pleaded guilty to federal charges in June 2026, Boelter said he planned the attacks alone, over a period of months.

Following his federal sentencing, prosecutors revealed that Boelter was motivated to commit the shooting because he believed that the Minnesota legislature was closely divided, and that by killing at least four state legislators, there would be an "inevitable shift in the balance of power in both legislative houses."

=== Manhunt and arrest ===
In response to the shooting, the governor's office activated the State Emergency Operations Center. Local authorities and federal law enforcement launched the largest manhunt in Minnesota history to find the shooter. A shelter-in-place order was issued in Brooklyn Park. Because the attacker had impersonated a police officer, residents were advised not to open the door to police unless two officers were present. The FBI offered a $50,000 reward for information leading to his capture. Images of Boelter were released showing him wearing a light-colored cowboy hat, dark long-sleeved shirt or jacket, light-colored pants, and dark sneakers.

Federal charging documents indicated that Boelter returned in the early morning to a Minneapolis apartment in which he occasionally lived and then approached a stranger at a bus stop around 7 a.m. The other man, who later reported the interaction to the police, agreed to sell Boelter his e-bike and a second-generation Buick LaCrosse, and the two went to a bank branch for cash to complete the transaction.

After the shootings, Boelter texted his wife and other relatives, "Dad went to war last night" and "I don't want you guys around." Law enforcement from Mille Lacs County detained and interrogated Boelter's wife, Jenny, at 10 a.m. on the day of the shootings. Police, tracking her via her cellphone, pulled her over with several of the couple's children during a traffic stop in Onamia, Minnesota. Law enforcement searched her car and reportedly found a weapon, ammunition, about $10,000 in cash, and passports for herself and the children.

Early on June 15, police found the Buick abandoned on the side of 301st Avenue near the Minnesota State Highway 25 intersection in nearby Henderson, Minnesota, in Sibley County, a few miles from his home in Green Isle, that was believed to have been used by Boelter, along with some of Boelter's belongings. The same day, an area resident captured images of Boelter on a trail camera. Officers set up a square-mile search perimeter deploying drones and police dogs. Boelter was located and tracked as he crawled through thick shrubs near the Mud Lake Waterfowl Production Area of Green Isle. He was arrested that evening in a field near his Green Isle home roughly 50 miles (80 km) southwest of Minneapolis, ending a nearly two-day manhunt involving hundreds of officers and 20 SWAT teams.

== Legal proceedings ==
Boelter was sent to the Sherburne County Jail in Elk River, Minnesota. Hennepin County prosecutors initially charged Boelter with two counts of second-degree murder in the killings of Melissa and Mark Hortman and two counts of attempted second-degree murder related to the shootings of John and Yvette Hoffman. On June 16, Boelter appeared in federal court, via United States District Court for the District of Minnesota, where he was federally charged with two counts of murder with a firearm, two additional counts of firearms offenses, and two counts of stalking. He was taken into federal custody until at least his next court appearance on June 27. At that court appearance, Boelter's bail hearing was delayed to July 3. Boelter was wearing a suicide prevention smock. On July 15, Boelter received six federal grand jury indictments for the murders and shootings.

Boelter's wife, Jenny, sent condolences on behalf of herself and her children, saying the family was blindsided and heartbroken over the violence, which she said betrayed their Christian faith and tenets. She divorced Boelter in October 2025, and was granted the family's home in Green Isle, Minnesota, and sole custody of their remaining minor child. On April 22, 2026, United States Attorney Daniel N. Rosen submitted his recommendation on whether to seek the death penalty to the Department of Justice.

On June 11, 2026, Boelter pleaded guilty to the federal charges as part of a deal to avoid the death penalty. Hennepin County prosecutors later announced that Boelter would still face state charges despite his guilty plea to the federal charges. On July 23, 2026, Boelter appeared in court for his sentencing. John Hoffman and his wife, Yvette, attended the hearing, and revealed that the attack had left them both traumatized, and that Yvette had been attending therapy weekly since the incident. Boelter was sentenced to two life sentences without the possibility of parole plus 40 years. Later that day, he filed a motion through his legal team requesting to serve his sentence at the United States Penitentiary, Coleman in Orlando, Florida.

Boelter's state trial began on August 3, 2026.
