= Andrews Park (Champlin, Minnesota) =

Park in Minnesota, United States

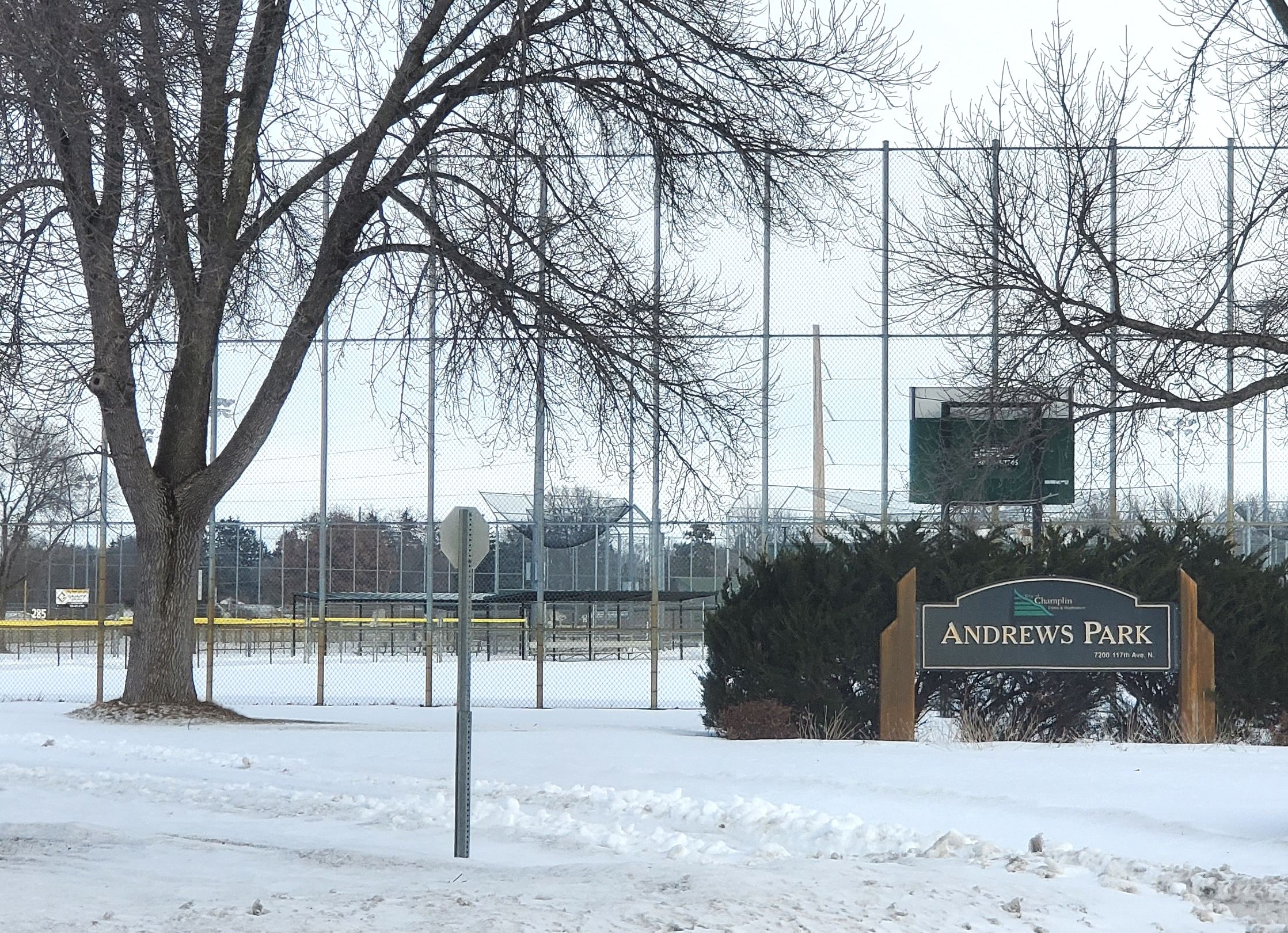
- Interactive map of Andrews Park
- Type: Public park
- Location: Champlin, Minnesota, United States
- Coordinates: 45°10′04″N 93°22′25″W
- Owner: The City of Champlin
- Operator: The City of Champlin

Andrews Park, Champlin Minnesota is a neighborhood park in Champlin, Minnesota. Andrews Park is a popular place in the community during the spring and summer seasons, providing a playground, splash pad with concession stand, athletic facilities, and a picnic pavilion which may be used for family reunions, birthday parties, and community events. In 2022, the Andrews Park Splash Pad will be open May 31 thru September 4.

== About ==
Andrews Park consists of a modular play area, one toddler-age creative play area, four softball fields, one baseball field, one basketball court, three soccer/football fields, two hockey rinks, four tennis courts, two sand volleyball courts, one large picnic are, one warming house, one park building with a concession area, multiple restrooms, and several trails to walk on.

== Location ==
Andrews park is located at 7200 117th Avenue N. in Champlin, Minnesota.

== Summer Sports ==
Under the Champlin Dayton Athletic Association, Andrews Park is the host of summer softball and soccer leagues. The softball league is for grades 1st through 12th and the soccer league is for grades pre-k through 12th. Andrews also hosts other Associations such as the Rebels Soccer club games and practices.

== Improvement Project ==
Andrews Park recently completed a three phase project. Phase 1 expanded the park's parking lots. Phase 2 consisted of the development of a new "splash pad", a larger picnic area, and building improvements. Lastly, Phase 3 included a new shade shelter for the softball fields. This project was finished in the fall of 2014.
