= Stephanie Olsen =

American educator and politician

Member of the Minnesota House of Representatives from the 47B district
- In office January 7, 2003 – January 4, 2005
- Preceded by: John Jordan
- Succeeded by: Melissa Hortman

Personal details
- Born: November 27, 1967 (age 58) Coon Rapids, Minnesota, US
- Party: Republican
- Spouse: Troy Olsen
- Children: 2 (adopted)
- Education: St. Cloud State University (B.S.)
- Profession: Educator, politician

Stephanie Olsen (born November 27, 1967) is an American educator and former Republican politician who served as a member of the Minnesota House of Representatives for one term. She represented District 47B from 2003 until 2005, when she was defeated by future Speaker of the Minnesota House Melissa Hortman.

== Early life and career ==
Olsen was born on November 27, 1967 in Coon Rapids, Minnesota. She attended St. Cloud State University and received a Bachelors of Science in social studies and secondary education.

== Political career ==
Olsen first ran for office in 1995 in a special election to the Minnesota House of Representatives, where she was unsuccessful in gaining the Republican nomination. After the campaign she was hired by the Republican Caucus as an education researcher.

Olsen next ran for office in 2002 when, as a result of redistricting, district 47B was left without an incumbent. She defeated Minnesota Democratic–Farmer–Labor Party candidate Melissa Hortman, also of Brooklyn Park.

Olsen was defeated for re-election in 2004 when she was defeated by Hortman in a rematch of 2002.

== Personal life ==
Olsen is married to Troy Olsen, they have two adopted daughters from China, adopted in 2004 and 2006.

== Electoral history ==
Year	Election	Date	Elected				Defeated				Total	Plurality
2002	General	Nov. 5	Stephanie Olsen	Rep.	8,850	51.67%	Melissa Hortman	DFL	7,467	43.60%	17,127	1,383
2002	General	Nov. 5	Stephanie Olsen	Rep.	8,850	51.67%	Adam M. Roesch	Ind.	797	4.65%	17,127	1,383
2004	General	Nov. 2	Melissa Hortman	DFL	10,846	50.90%	Stephanie Olsen (inc)	Rep.	10,444	49.01%	21,309	402
