= Minnesota's 36th Senate district =

American legislative district

Coordinates: 44°35′N 93°0′W

Minnesota's 64th State Senate district
Senator
Heather Gustafson; DFL–Vadnais Heights
since January 3, 2023

The Minnesota Senate, District 36 encompasses portions of Hennepin County and Anoka County in the northern Twin Cities metropolitan area. Before 2010, the district represented portions of Dakota County and portions of Goodhue County, and was one of eleven Senate Districts within Minnesota Congressional District 2. The district was represented by Democratic-Farmer-Labor Senator John Hoffman from 2013 until 2023. It is currently represented by Heather Gustafson.
