= 2025 shootings of Minnesota legislators =

2025 murder spree in Minnesota, U.S.

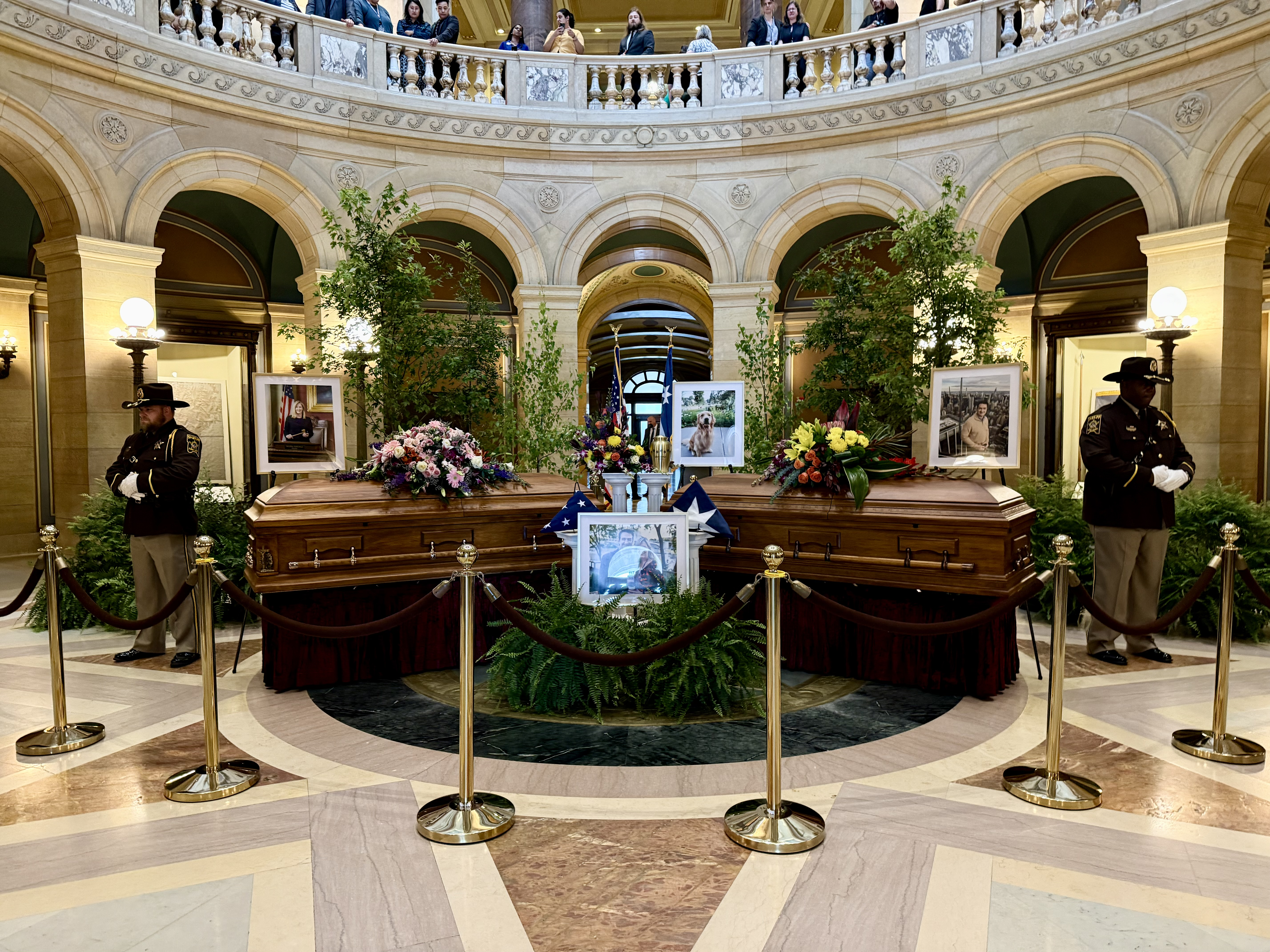
- Melissa Hortman, her husband Mark, and their dog Gilbert all lying in state at the Minnesota State Capitol
- Location: Brooklyn Park and Champlin, Minnesota, US
- Date: June 14, 2025; 17 months ago 2:00 a.m. – 3:35 a.m. (CDT; UTC−05:00)
- Target: Democratic legislators
- Attack type: Assassination; attempted assassination; spree shooting; mass shooting
- Weapon: 9mm Beretta 92 semi-automatic pistol
- Deaths: 2
- Injuries: 2
- Perpetrator: Vance Boelter
- Motive: Shift the balance of power in the Minnesota legislature
- Charges: 7 counts (Note: State: First-degree premeditated murder (2 counts); Attempted first-degree murder (4 counts); Felony cruelty to an animal; Impersonating a police officer)
- Verdict: Federal: Pleaded guilty
- Convictions: 6 counts (Note: Federal: Stalking using interactive computer service (2 counts); Use of a firearm to murder in relation to stalking (2 counts); Discharge of a firearm in relation to stalking (2 counts))
- Sentence: Federal: Two consecutive life sentences without the possibility of parole plus 40 years

In the early morning of June 14, 2025, Minnesota state representative Melissa Hortman was assassinated at her home in Brooklyn Park, Minnesota, United States, by Vance Boelter. Hortman, the leader of the state House Democratic caucus, was shot and killed alongside her husband, Mark. Less than two hours earlier, Democratic state senator John Hoffman and his wife, Yvette, were shot and seriously injured by Boelter at their home in nearby Champlin and hospitalized. Police responding to the attack on the Hoffmans checked on the Hortmans' home, where Boelter fired at them. He then escaped, sparking the most extensive manhunt in Minnesota history.

The authorities quickly identified 57-year-old Boelter as a suspect and captured him on the evening of June 15 in Green Isle, Minnesota. He was federally charged with murder, stalking, and firearms offenses. The state charged Boelter with two counts of second-degree murder and two counts of attempted second-degree murder; a grand jury upgraded the state's murder charges to first-degree on August 15. On June 11, 2026, Boelter pleaded guilty to all the federal charges. On July 23, 2026, Boelter was sentenced to two consecutive life sentences without the possibility of parole. Boelter said he planned the attacks alone over several months, and that he had intended to "shift the balance of power" in Minnesota's legislature by killing at least four Democratic lawmakers.

Both Hortman and Hoffman were members of the Democratic Party-affiliated DFL. Federal charging documents described Boelter as acting with "the intent to kill, injure, harass, and intimidate Minnesota legislators". Minnesota governor Tim Walz called the shooting "an act of targeted political violence". Inside Boelter's vehicle was a list of nearly 70 people, including abortion rights advocates, Democratic politicians, and abortion providers.

== Events ==
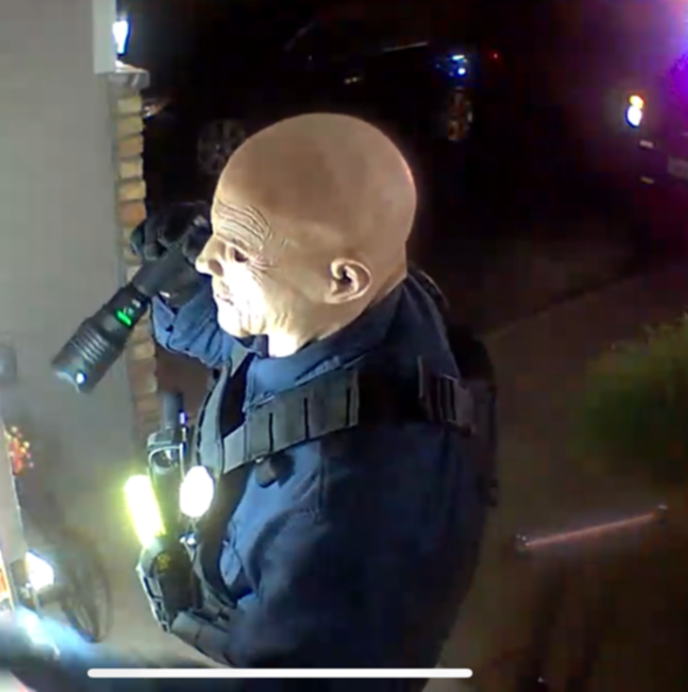
Boelter upon arriving at the Hortman residence, wearing a mask

Boelter arrived at the Hoffman residence in Champlin shortly before 2 a.m. CDT (UTC−5) on June 14, 2025. He knocked on the door, shouting that he was a police officer. As the Hoffmans opened the door, he asked if they had weapons. John Hoffman shouted "You're not a cop" and attempted to push Boelter out the door; Boelter said "this is a robbery" and repeatedly shot both of them with a 9mm Beretta 92 handgun. At 2:06 a.m., police in Champlin responded to an emergency call from the Hoffmans' adult daughter, Hope; they found Hoffman and his wife, Yvette, with gunshot wounds. John Hoffman was shot nine times and Yvette eight times. According to Hope, her parents pushed her out of the way to protect her from Boelter, and while she sustained minor injuries when her body slammed into their washing machine, she was not struck by bullets.

According to acting United States Attorney for Minnesota Joseph H. Thompson, Boelter next went to state representative Kristin Bahner's house in Maple Grove, where he rang the doorbell. Bahner, on vacation with her family, was not at home, and Boelter left. Soon thereafter, he parked near state senator Ann Rest's residence in New Hope. New Hope police had heard about the Hoffmans' shooting and dispatched an officer to perform a wellness check on Rest. The officer arrived at Rest's house at 2:36 a.m. and saw Boelter's black SUV parked down the street. Believing him to be a colleague also sent to protect Rest, the officer tried to talk to Boelter, but he did not respond. The officer continued to Rest's house. Boelter left New Hope and went to the Hortman residence in Brooklyn Park.

Boelter arrived at the Hortman residence at about 3:30 a.m, still impersonating a police officer and wearing a silicone face mask and wig. He knocked on the door and told Mark Hortman, who answered, that he was performing a welfare check, shining a flashlight in Hortman's eyes. Two Brooklyn Park police officers, alerted by their colleagues in Champlin to the shooting, went to check on the Hortmans. They arrived at the Hortman home at 3:35 a.m. and saw what appeared to be a police vehicle in the driveway. Brooklyn Park chief of police Mark Bruley said the vehicle "looked exactly like an SUV squad car".

As the officers approached the Hortman residence, they saw Boelter, wearing a realistic silicone mask (an old man disguise), a full police uniform (including body armor), a badge, and standard police gear. Boelter then drew his gun and shot at Mark Hortman and the officers, who returned fire. Boelter then "charged forward" into the house. Security camera footage indicated that he then proceeded to shoot Melissa Hortman as she attempted to flee upstairs. The police moved Mark from the threshold of the home and he was pronounced dead shortly thereafter. A drone was used to enter the residence, where Melissa Hortman's body was found. More officers were called to the scene, surrounding the house, and a SWAT team arrived. Boelter escaped on foot. Officers did not enter the house until 4:38 a.m., over an hour later, against the department's policy on confronting active shooters.

== Victims ==
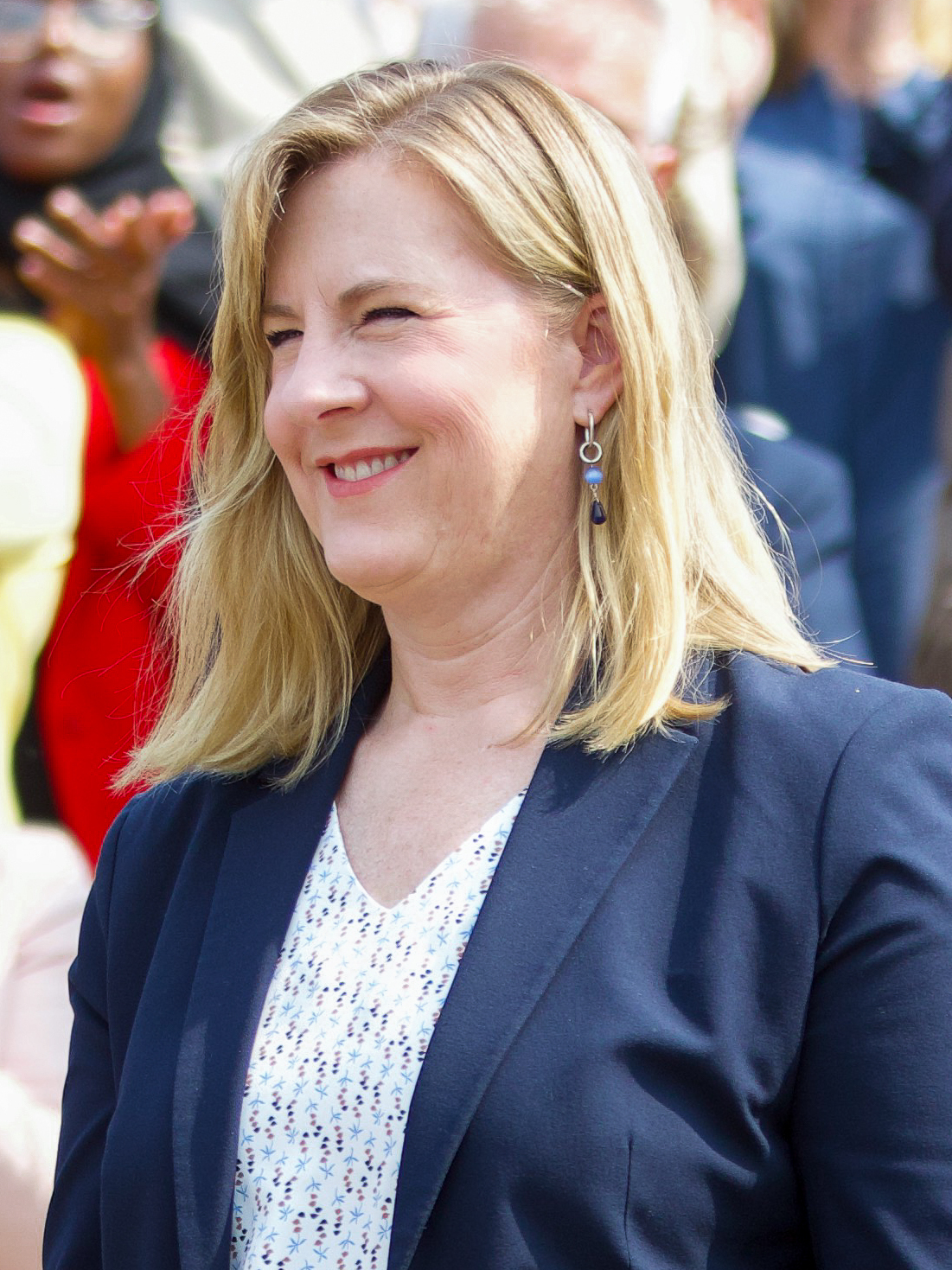
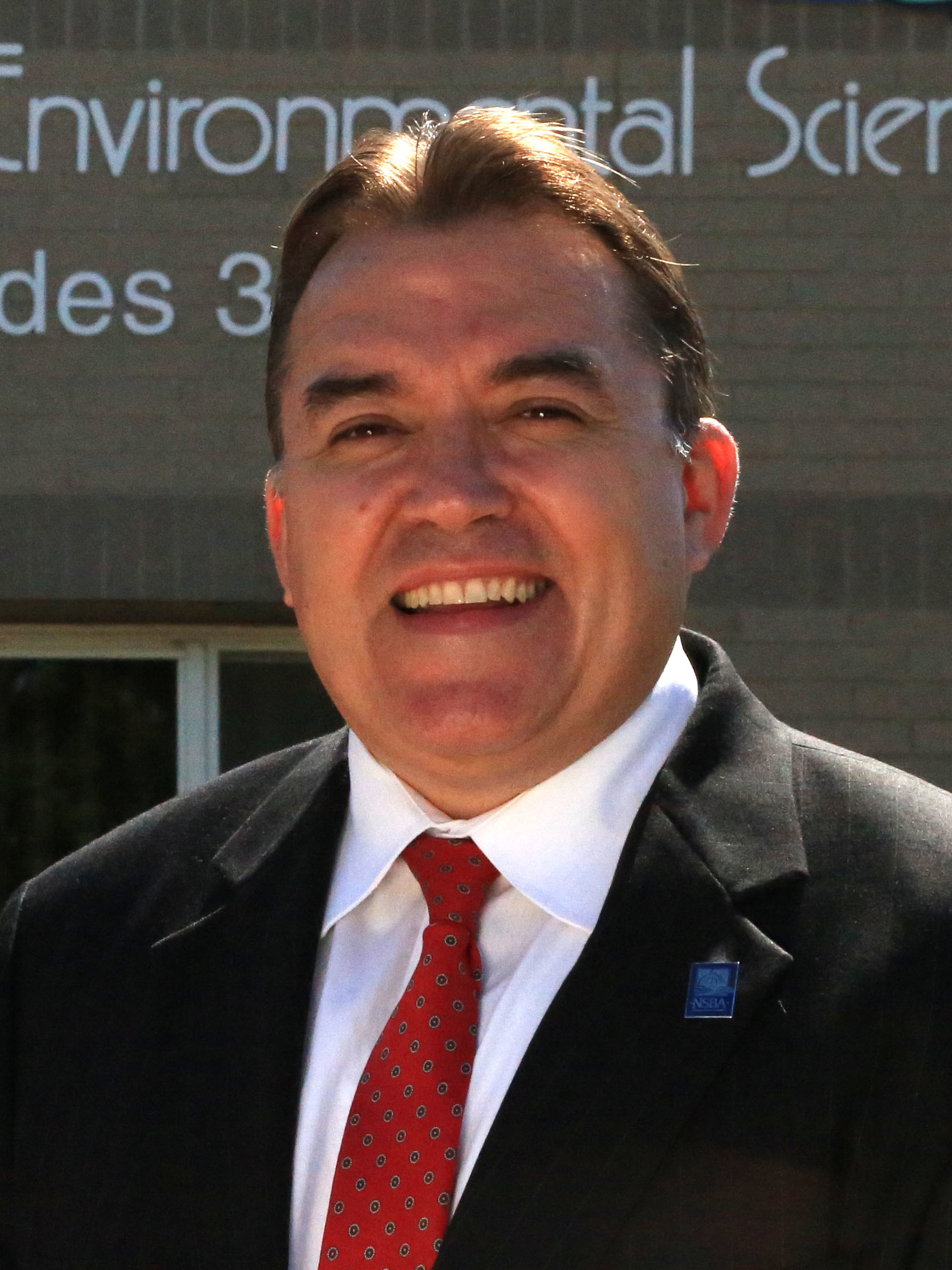
State representative Melissa Hortman (left) and her husband were killed, while state senator John Hoffman (right) and his wife were injured.

Melissa and Mark Hortman were killed. Melissa Hortman, who was first elected in 2004, served from 2017 to 2019 as the state house minority leader and from 2019 to 2025 as the 61st speaker of the Minnesota House of Representatives. The Hortmans' pet Golden Retriever Gilbert, allegedly shot by Boelter, was "gravely injured" during the attack and euthanized afterward. John and Yvette Hoffman survived and were out of surgery by 9:50 a.m. that day. First elected in 2012, John Hoffman served as minority whip from 2017 to 2020. Like Representative Hortman, he is a member of the Minnesota Democratic–Farmer–Labor Party, the Democratic Party's Minnesota affiliate.

On June 19, Hoffman and his wife released a joint statement about the assassination attempt. On July 15, their daughter Hope also released a statement, saying "my parents saved me". On June 27, Melissa Hortman, her husband Mark, and their dog Gilbert all lay in state at the Minnesota State Capitol. Hortman is the first woman to receive this honor. Thousands paid their respects, with the service attended by a number of high-profile Democrats, including former president Joe Biden, former vice president Kamala Harris, and Governor Tim Walz. In 2026, a section of Minnesota State Highway 610 was renamed the Hortman Memorial Highway in honor of the couple.

== Perpetrator ==
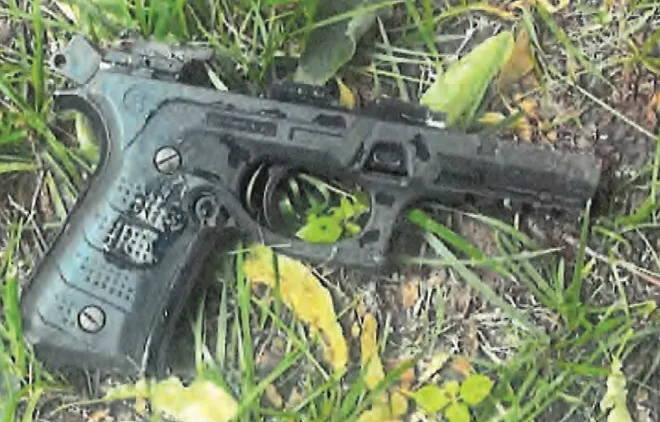
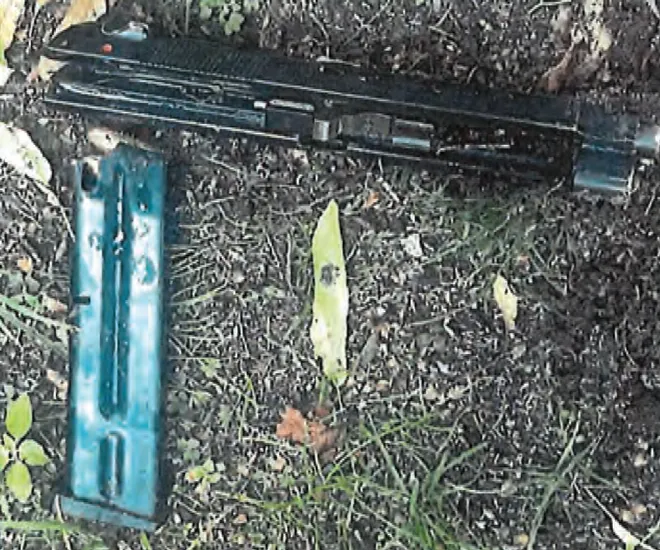
Parts of Boelter's recovered Beretta 92 handgun

Vance Luther Boelter was born in Sleepy Eye, Minnesota, and graduated from St. Cloud State University in 1996 with a degree in international relations. He later earned a master's degree and then a doctorate in leadership from the now-closed Cardinal Stritch University in Milwaukee County, Wisconsin. Boelter worked as a 7-Eleven store manager and a funeral home employee in the 2010s and 2020s. He also started two companies and co-founded an evangelical nonprofit, Revoformation Ministries, with his wife. On social media, Boelter claimed to have military training and a career in private security, but National Public Radio found "no history working in law enforcement, the military or private security". A friend of Boelter's said he made claims about his life that were "fantasy". His company, Praetorian Guard Security Services, was registered with the state to his home address and listed him as "the director of security patrols", but there is no record the company ever had any clients. In 2016, he was appointed to the Governor's Workforce Development Board, a nonpartisan 60-member unpaid advisory board, by then-Governor of Minnesota Mark Dayton. Governor Tim Walz reappointed him to a four-year term in 2019. Boelter's only prior legal troubles were minor traffic violations. In 2020, he bought the Beretta 92 handgun used in the shootings.

Federal charging documents say Boelter acted with "the intent to kill, injure, harass, and intimidate Minnesota legislators". His anti-abortion views are a possible motive. A childhood friend called Boelter "a conservative who voted for President Donald Trump and was strongly against abortion rights" and said Boelter was having financial problems and struggling to find work. Boelter's SUV was left in the Hortmans' driveway and contained a list of about 70 potential targets, including "abortion providers, pro-abortion rights advocates, and lawmakers in Minnesota, Wisconsin, and other states"; Hortman and Hoffman were also on the list. In a letter addressed to the FBI found in Boelter's abandoned car near his house, Boelter claimed that Governor Tim Walz instructed him to kill multiple officials, especially Amy Klobuchar, to allow Walz to run for her Senate seat. People with knowledge of the letter who spoke to the Star Tribune described it as rambling, incoherent, and conspiratorial. As he pleaded guilty to federal charges in June 2026, Boelter said he had planned the attacks alone over several months. After his federal sentencing, prosecutors said Boelter was motivated to commit the shooting because he believed that by killing at least four Democratic state legislators, he could bring about a "shift in the balance of power in both legislative houses". In court, Boelter has espoused many conspiracy theories, including that Chinese agents working out of their Minnesota embassy have impacted his case. China has no embassy or consulate in Minnesota.

=== Manhunt and arrest ===
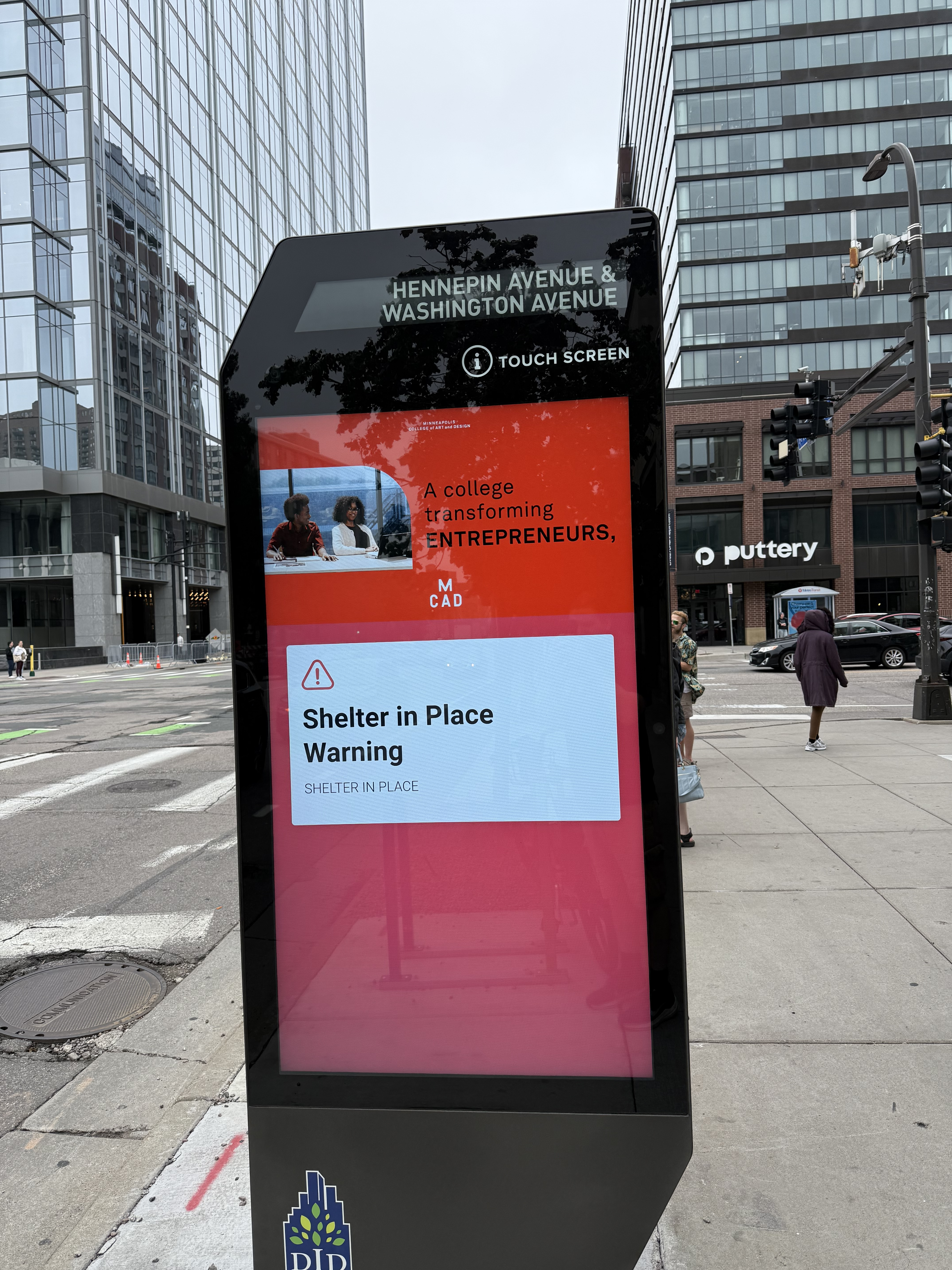
A shelter-in-place warning issued in downtown Minneapolis during the manhunt

In response to the shooting, the governor's office activated the State Emergency Operations Center. Local authorities and federal law enforcement launched the largest manhunt in Minnesota history to find the shooter. Images of Boelter were released showing him wearing a light-colored cowboy hat, dark long-sleeved shirt or jacket, light-colored pants, and dark sneakers.

After the shootings, Boelter texted his wife and other relatives, "Dad went to war last night" and "I don't want you guys around." Law enforcement from Mille Lacs County detained and interrogated Boelter's wife at 10 a.m. on the day of the shootings. Police, tracking her via her cellphone, pulled her over with several of the couple's children during a traffic stop in Onamia, Minnesota.

Early on June 15, police found the Buick that Boelter was believed to have used and some of his belongings abandoned on the side of 301st Avenue near the Minnesota State Highway 25 intersection in Henderson, Minnesota, a few miles from his home in Green Isle. The same day, an area resident captured images of Boelter on a trail camera. Officers set up a square-mile search perimeter deploying drones and police dogs. Boelter was located and tracked as he crawled through thick shrubs near the Mud Lake Waterfowl Production Area of Green Isle. He was arrested that evening in a field near his home about 50 miles (80 km) southwest of Minneapolis, ending a nearly two-day manhunt involving hundreds of officers and 20 SWAT teams.

=== Legal proceedings ===
Boelter was sent to the Sherburne County Jail in Elk River, Minnesota. Hennepin County prosecutors initially charged Boelter with two counts of second-degree murder in the killings of Melissa and Mark Hortman and two counts of attempted second-degree murder related to the shootings of John and Yvette Hoffman. Boelter's state trial began on August 3, 2026.

On June 16, Boelter appeared in federal court, via United States District Court for the District of Minnesota, where he was federally charged with two counts of murder with a firearm, two additional counts of firearms offenses, and two counts of stalking. On June 11, 2026, Boelter pleaded guilty to the federal charges as part of a deal to avoid the death penalty. Prosecutors later announced that Boelter would still face state charges despite his guilty plea to the federal charges. On July 23, 2026, Boelter was sentenced to two consecutive life sentences plus 40 years in prison.

== Responses ==
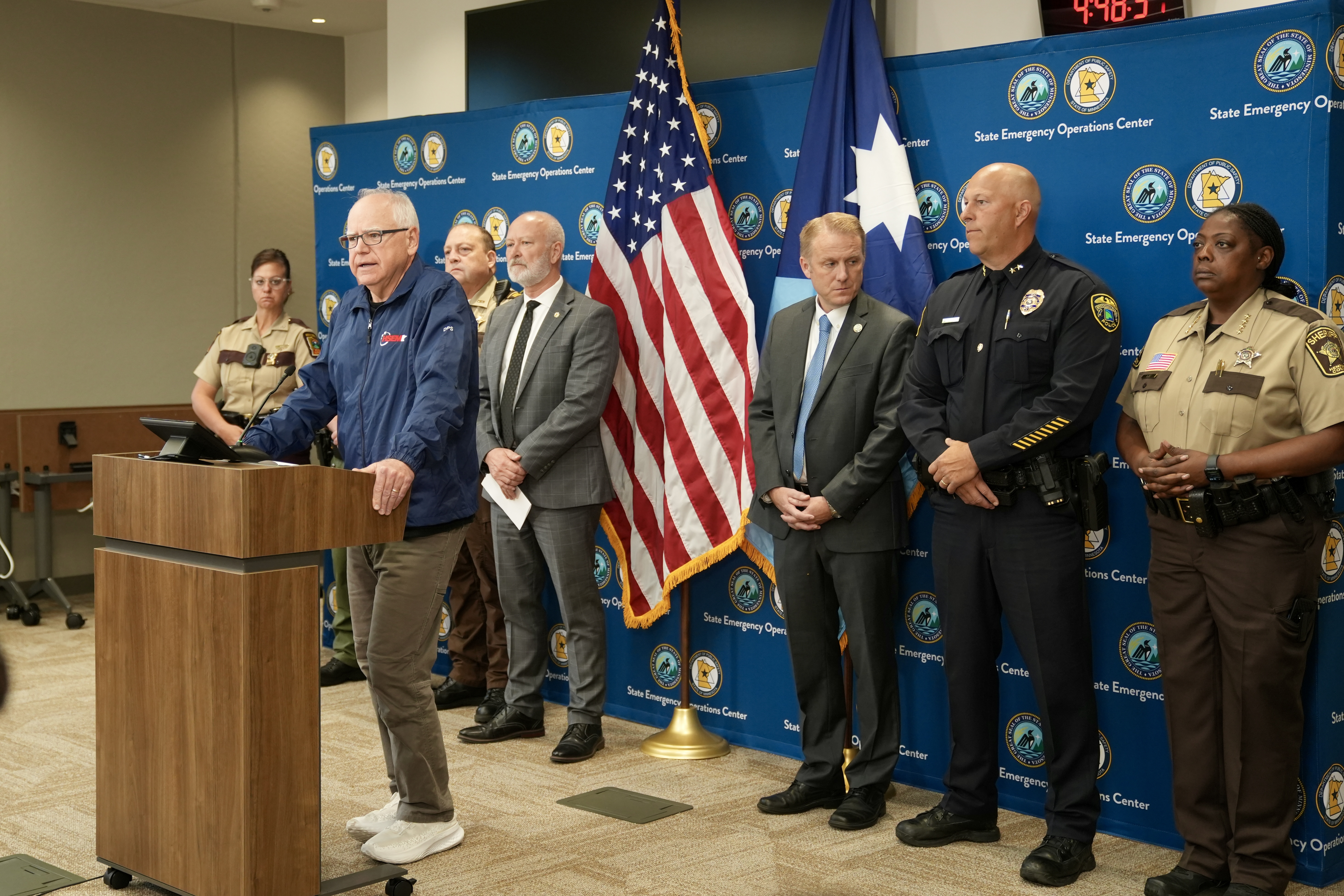
Tim Walz at a press conference safety briefing shortly after the shootings

The shootings occurred amid increasing threats and political violence against state and national lawmakers since 2017. Boelter's wife, Jenny, sent condolences on behalf of herself and her children, saying the family was blindsided and heartbroken over the violence, which she said betrayed their Christian faith and tenets. She divorced Boelter in October 2025, and was granted the family's Green Isle home and sole custody of their remaining minor child.

=== Local ===
At a press conference with law enforcement, Governor Walz described Hortman as "someone who served the people of Minnesota with grace, compassion, humor and a sense of service" and called the shooting "an act of targeted political violence". U.S. senator from Minnesota Amy Klobuchar, who knew Hortman, said she was "heartbroken and horrified" and that the killing was motivated by opposition to abortion rights. She called the shootings an act of targeted political violence and an attack on American democracy.

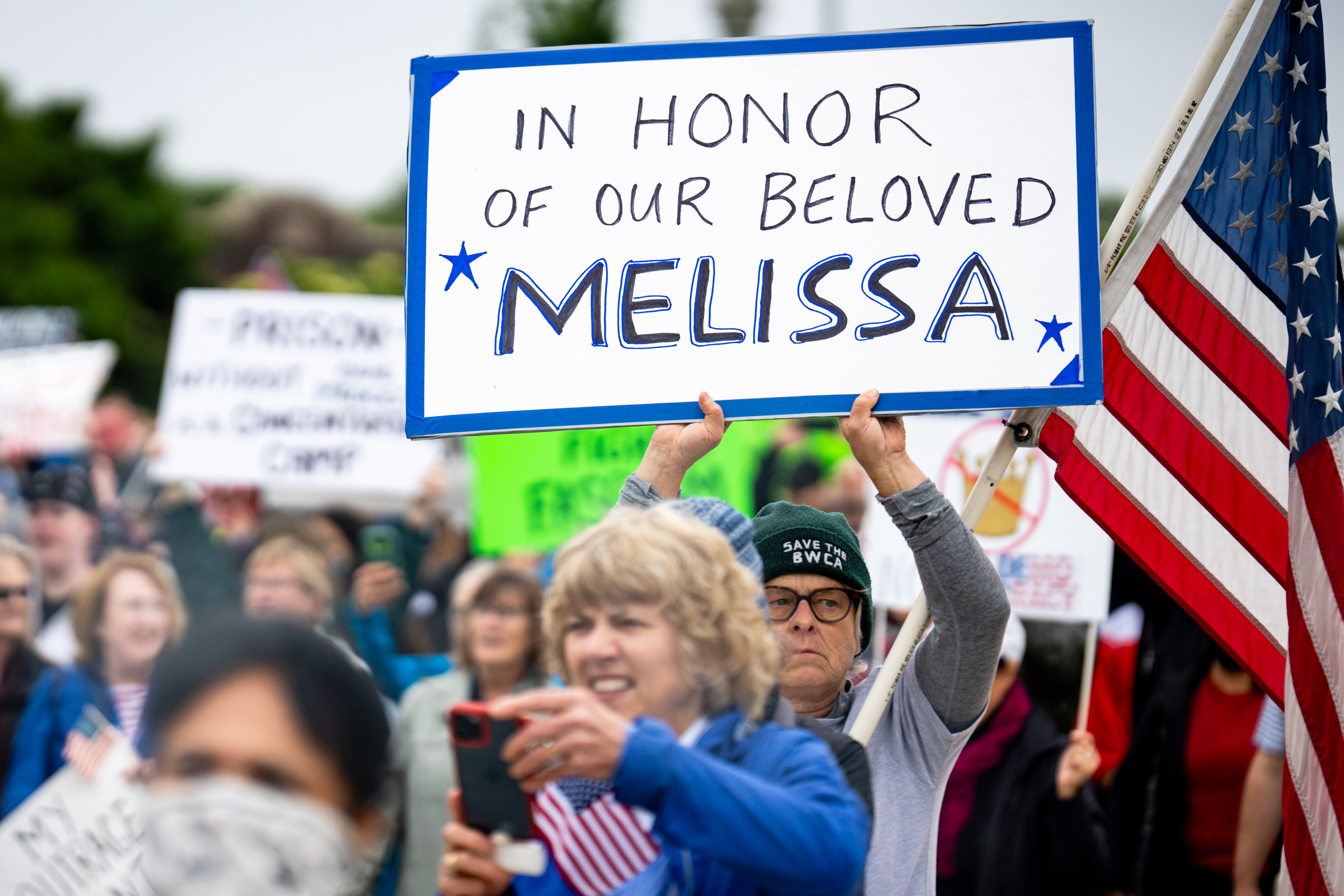
A "No Kings" protestor at the Minnesota State Capitol with a sign remembering Melissa Hortman

House majority whip Tom Emmer, who represents Minnesota's 6th congressional district, condemned "this despicable act of political violence". Ken Martin, the chair of the Democratic National Committee and a former chair of the Minnesota Democratic–Farmer–Labor Party, called the shootings indicative of "extremism and political violence" in the U.S. Mark Johnson, the minority leader of the Minnesota Senate, represented Senate Republicans in condemning "this brazen act of violence". Minnesota House speaker Lisa Demuth said she was "shocked and horrified" and sending prayers to the victims and law enforcement.

No Kings protests opposing the U.S. Army 250th Anniversary Parade and the policies and actions of the second presidency of Donald Trump were planned for that day. A spokesperson for the Minnesota State Patrol asked the public not to attend those protests "out of an abundance of caution". The Minnesota "No Kings" organizers canceled the protests, but thousands later attended a rally in Saint Paul. In response to public nervousness over potential attackers impersonating police officers, Minnesota police advised residents that they could call 911 for verification before opening a door or window.

=== National ===
President Donald Trump, himself the target of two assassination attempts in 2024, said the U.S. Department of Justice and the FBI were investigating the shooting and that "horrific violence will not be tolerated". After initially saying he might call Walz, Trump said on June 17 he had no plans to do so, calling Walz "whacked out" and "a mess". U.S. Attorney General Pam Bondi said the shootings "will be prosecuted to the fullest extent of the law". FBI deputy director Dan Bongino announced that the "FBI is fully engaged on the ground in Minnesota and is working in collaboration with our local and state partners".

U.S. House speaker Mike Johnson called the shootings "horrific political violence" that "every leader must unequivocally condemn". House majority leader Steve Scalise, who was seriously injured in the 2017 congressional baseball shooting, said "there can be no tolerance of political violence and it must be stopped". Former U.S. representative Gabby Giffords, the target of an assassination attempt in 2011, said she was "horrified and heartbroken" by the attack. U.S. representative and former House speaker Nancy Pelosi, whose husband was injured in a politically motivated home invasion in 2022, condemned the "abhorrent manifestation of political violence in our country". The day after the attack, House minority leader Hakeem Jeffries said, "This should be another wakeup call amongst many that have happened over the last several years, including, of course, the violent attack on the Capitol that took place on January 6." Jeffries requested that the Sergeant at Arms of the United States House of Representatives and the Capitol Police "ensure the safety of our Minnesota delegation and members of Congress across the country". Pennsylvania governor Josh Shapiro, whose residence was firebombed two months earlier, said he was pained by the shootings.

Based on Boelter's notebooks, the police and FBI believe he found the victims' addresses through data brokerages. Boelter had lists of 11 data broker websites, with people's home addresses and other personal information widely available online. The events have led to more calls to reform U.S. privacy laws. Senator Ron Wyden said, "Every single American's safety is at risk until Congress cracks down on this sleazy industry."

After the assassination of Charlie Kirk in September 2025, Trump was criticized for failing to mention the Minnesota shootings during his national address, solely blaming "the radical left" for recent political violence and mentioning no Democratic victims of violence. Trump was also criticized for ordering the flag be lowered in honor of Kirk after not doing so for Hortman. The Center for Strategic and International Studies classified Boelter's shootings as a "right-wing terrorist attack".

=== Right-wing misinformation ===
Many prominent right-wing and far-right figures falsely characterized Boelter as left-wing, a Democrat, and an ally of Governor Tim Walz. Elon Musk shared tweets saying that "the left" had killed Hortman and tweeted, "The far left is murderously violent." U.S. senator Mike Lee tweeted multiple times that the suspect was a "Marxist" and blamed the assassination on Walz. Donald Trump Jr. claimed the suspect "seems to be a leftist" and "was a Democrat". U.S. senator Bernie Moreno and U.S. representative Derrick Van Orden both suggested that the shooter was a far-left extremist. Large right-wing social media accounts began spreading similar misinformation. Right-wing commentator Mike Cernovich suggested that Walz had ordered the assassinations, and Laura Loomer called Boelter one of "Walz's goons" and called for Walz to be "detained" and "interrogated" by the FBI. YouTuber Benny Johnson called the suspect a "Tim Walz associate". Other posts falsely claimed that a photo of a man at a No Kings protest in Texas was that of the suspect.

The Guardian called this "the latest example of a right-wing media ecosystem that swiftly spins up narratives that serve their political agendas after tragic events, regardless of accuracy, and does not correct them after further information shows them to be untrue or incomplete". The misinformation was condemned by Minnesota state lawmakers, Republicans and Democrats alike, who said that intensely partisan rhetoric was harmful. Unlike their state legislature counterparts, Minnesota's Republican congressional delegation did not address Lee's comments.

After it became known that the suspect was a Trump voter, unsubstantiated claims that the killings were a "false flag" by the "deep state" and a "psyop" spread on social media. Alex Jones claimed Boelter was a "patsy" who was "being framed". Loomer also suggested that Boelter was not the actual perpetrator.

In January 2026, Trump reposted a false claim on TruthSocial asserting that Walz and alleged fraud in state programs were connected to the shootings. Trump was criticized by Minnesota officials, including Walz, who said, "in covering for an actual serial killer, he is going to get more innocent people killed." The Hortmans' children called on Trump to remove the post and apologize. The White House did not respond to a request for comment on the post.

== See also ==
- 2011 Tucson shooting – Mass shooting in metro Tucson, Arizona, US
- List of assassinated American politicians
- Political polarization in the United States
- Political violence in the United States
