= Melissa Hortman =

American lawyer and politician (1970–2025)

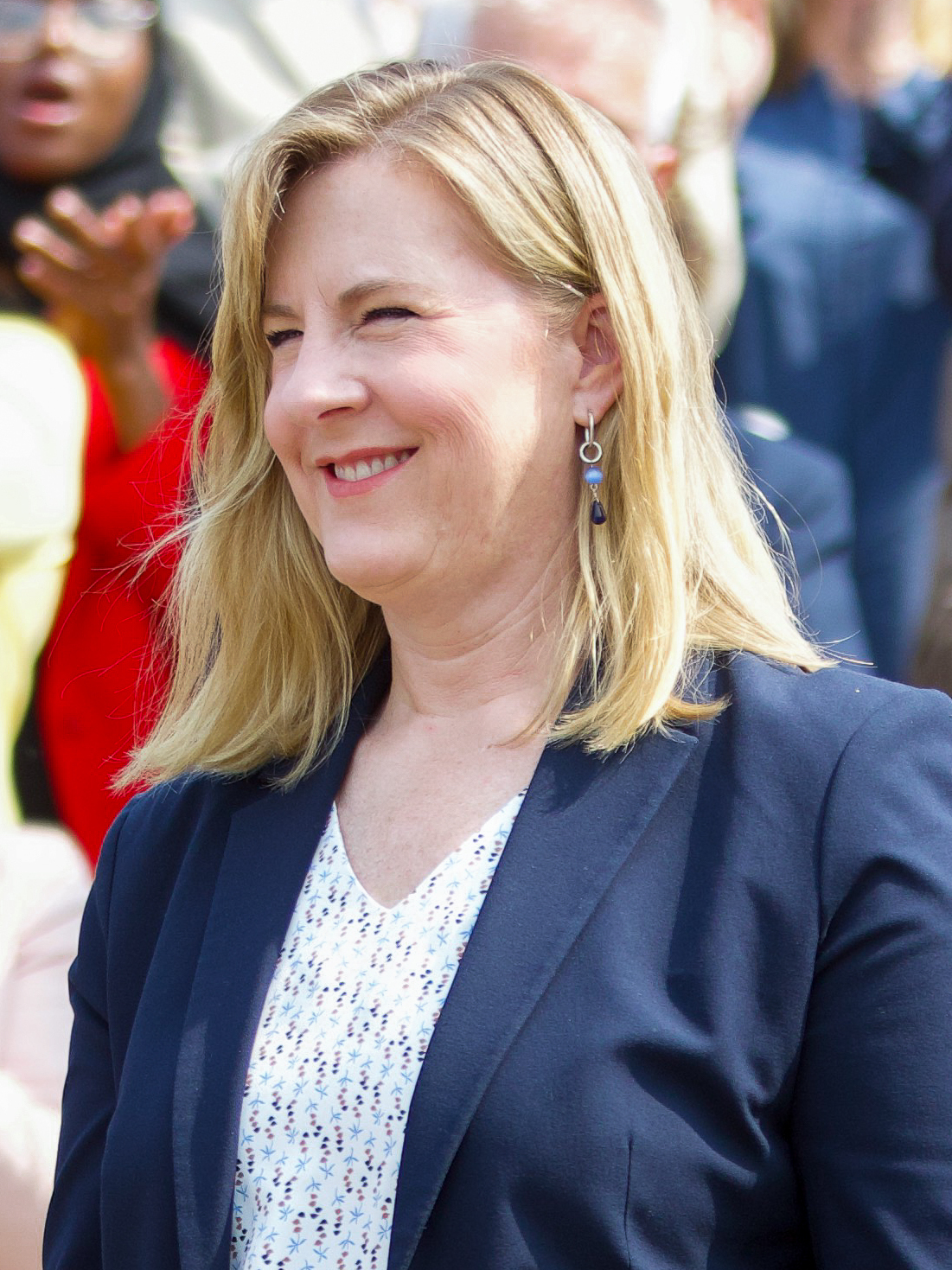
- Hortman in 2023

61st Speaker of the Minnesota House of Representatives
- In office January 8, 2019 – January 14, 2025
- Preceded by: Kurt Daudt
- Succeeded by: Lisa Demuth

DFL Caucus Leader of the Minnesota House of Representatives
- In office March 17, 2025 – June 14, 2025
- Preceded by: Position established
- Succeeded by: Zack Stephenson

Minority Leader of the Minnesota House of Representatives
- In office February 6, 2025 – March 17, 2025
- Preceded by: Lisa Demuth
- Succeeded by: Vacant
- In office January 3, 2017 – January 8, 2019
- Preceded by: Paul Thissen
- Succeeded by: Kurt Daudt

Member of the Minnesota House of Representatives
- In office January 4, 2005 – June 14, 2025
- Preceded by: Stephanie Olsen
- Succeeded by: Xp Lee
- Constituency: District 47B (2005–2013); District 36B (2013–2023); District 34B (2023–2025)

Personal details
- Born: Melissa Anne Haluptzok; May 27, 1970 Fridley, Minnesota, U.S.
- Died: June 14, 2025 (aged 55) Brooklyn Park, Minnesota, U.S.
- Cause of death: Assassination by gunshot
- Resting place: Morningside Memorial Gardens Cemetery, Coon Rapids, Minnesota, U.S.
- Party: Democratic (DFL)
- Spouse: Mark Hortman (m. 1993)
- Children: 2
- Education: Boston University (BA); University of Minnesota (JD); Harvard University (MPA)
- Website: State House website; Campaign website

Melissa Anne Hortman (née Haluptzok; May 27, 1970 – June 14, 2025) was an American politician and lawyer who served as the 61st speaker of the Minnesota House of Representatives. A member of the Democratic–Farmer–Labor Party, she represented northern parts of the Twin Cities metropolitan area in the Minnesota House of Representatives from 2005 to 2025, serving as the House minority leader from 2017 to 2019 and as speaker from 2019 to January 2025. During her tenure, she advocated for transportation, environmental rights, abortion rights, police reform, and gun control policies. She was also the chief author of the state's solar energy standard.

On June 14, 2025, Hortman and her husband were assassinated in a politically motivated attack at their home in Brooklyn Park, Minnesota.

== Early life and education ==
Hortman was born Melissa Anne Haluptzok in Fridley, Minnesota, on May 27, 1970. She grew up in Spring Lake Park and Andover, and became interested in being a politician at age ten, while watching coverage of the 1980 presidential election. She graduated from Blaine High School in Blaine, Minnesota, in 1988.

Hortman received a Bachelor of Arts (magna cum laude) with a major in philosophy and political science from Boston University in 1991, a Juris Doctor (cum laude) from the University of Minnesota Law School in 1995, and a Master in Public Administration from Harvard Kennedy School in 2018.

== Early career ==
Hortman worked as an intern in the United States Senate for Al Gore and John Kerry, and clerked for Judge John Sommerville while in law school. She served on the Brooklyn Park City Human Relations Commission and worked as an assistant county attorney for Hennepin County. She first gained public attention in 1997, as a lawyer on a case involving housing discrimination by landlords; she won a $490,181 civil award for her client, which was "then the largest such award in state history".

== Minnesota House of Representatives ==
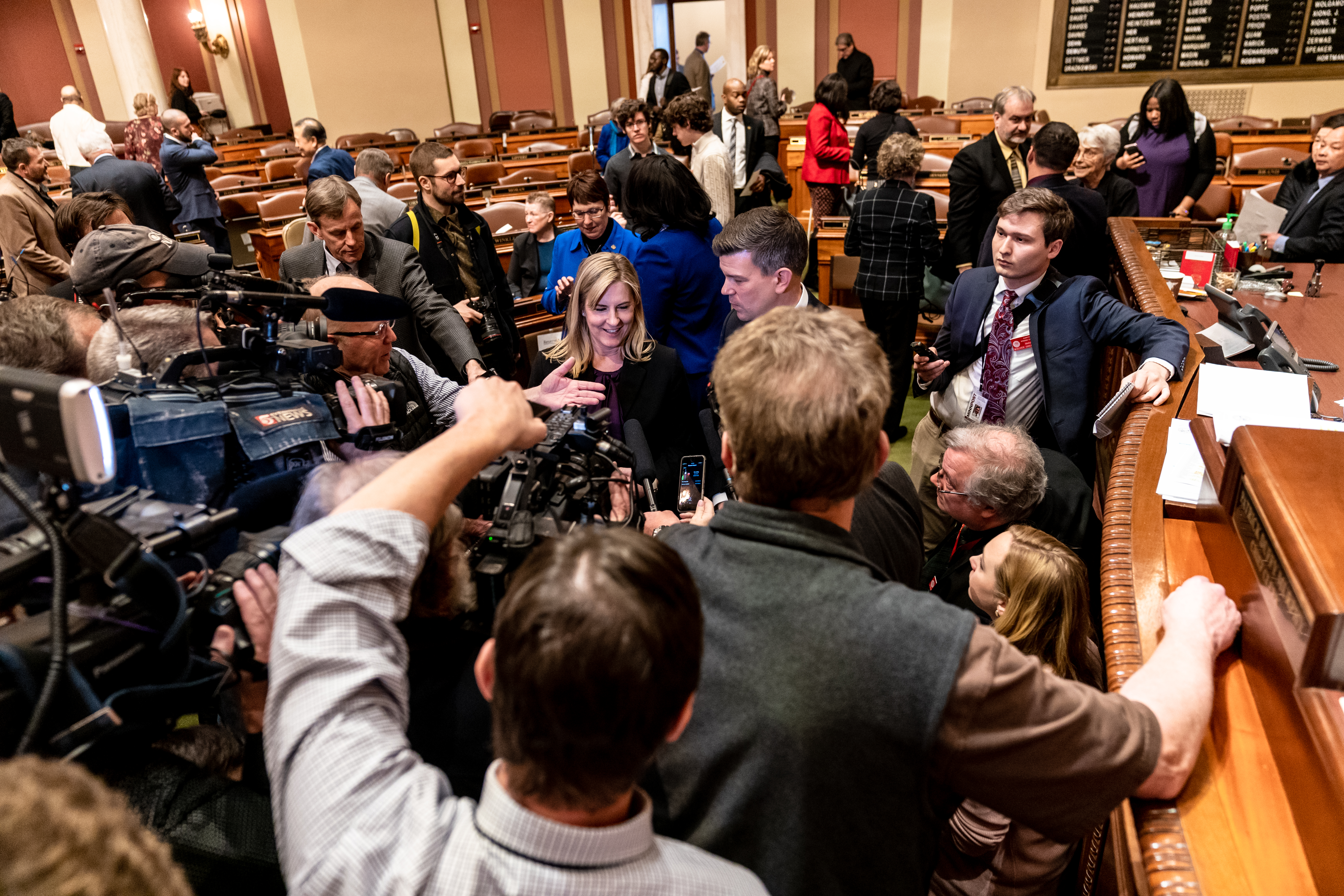
Hortman speaks to press after becoming Speaker of the House (January 2019).

Hortman was elected to the Minnesota House of Representatives in 2004, defeating Republican incumbent Stephanie Olsen, and was reelected every two years thereafter until her death. She first ran unsuccessfully in 1998, and again in 2002.

Hortman served as an assistant majority leader from 2007 to 2010 and as minority whip from 2011 to 2012. From 2013 to 2014 she served as House speaker pro tempore and chaired the Energy Policy Committee. She served as deputy minority leader from 2015 to 2016. After Paul Thissen retired, Hortman was elected by her caucus to be minority leader from 2017 to 2018. When the DFL caucus retook the majority in the 2018 election, her colleagues elected her Speaker of the House.

In her first term, Hortman was an outspoken advocate for the Northstar Commuter Rail line, which ran through her district. She also supported a new stadium for the Minnesota Twins. She was an advocate for environmental issues and the effort to bring the 2020 Summer Olympics to Minnesota. She was pro-choice, supported gun control policies, and opposed voter identification initiatives. In 2008, Hortman managed the DFL floor operation during a successful attempt to override then-Governor Tim Pawlenty's veto of a gas tax increase. While chair of the Energy Policy Committee, she was the chief author of the state's solar energy standard and community solar laws.

Hortman served as the minority leader of the Minnesota House of Representatives from 2017 to 2019 and as the 61st Speaker of the Minnesota House of Representatives from 2019 to 2025.

In April 2017, Hortman drew attention when she criticized several Republican representatives for playing a card game in the retiring room off the House chamber during discussions on a public safety budget bill. Specifically, she called attention to the fact that the game was occurring while two Democratic women from ethnic minorities were delivering personal speeches. Hortman continued to back her statement, while some Republicans called for her to resign.

In July 2020, Hortman helped negotiate a police reform bill that "limits the use of neck restraints and chokeholds, prohibits departments from offering controversial warrior-style training, and creates an independent state unit to investigate when a police officer kills someone or is accused of sexual misconduct".

From the start of the 94th Minnesota Legislature in January 2025 until early February, Hortman led a boycott of House sessions to deny Republicans a quorum to conduct business. Republican Lisa Demuth was elected speaker on February 6. After a power-sharing agreement was reached, Hortman served again as minority leader until March 17, when a special election created a tie between the parties in the House; her title then changed to "DFL Leader" and she was granted significant powers alongside Demuth.

In June 2025, during a one-day special legislative session to complete the state budget, Hortman voted with Republicans in favor of legislation removing undocumented adult immigrants from eligibility for MinnesotaCare as part of a negotiated compromise between the GOP and the DFL to pass a budget. She was the only DFL member of the House to support the provision, which passed by a single vote.

== Personal life ==
Hortman was married to Mark Hortman, with whom she had two children. They lived in Brooklyn Park, Minnesota. Hortman was Catholic and taught Sunday school in Blaine.

== Assassination ==
On June 14, 2025, Hortman, her husband, and their golden retriever Gilbert were shot and killed at their home by a man impersonating a police officer. Another lawmaker, John Hoffman, and his wife were injured earlier that night by the same man. Minnesota governor Tim Walz said the shooting appeared to be a politically motivated assassination.

The suspect in the shooting was 57-year-old Vance Luther Boelter. Boelter was arrested on June 15 after a large-scale manhunt.

Earlier on June 15, U.S. Senator Amy Klobuchar called Hortman's killing a "politically motivated assassination" and said that authorities believed Boelter was hiding somewhere in the Midwest and "might" still be in Minnesota. Boelter was apprehended in Sibley County after being spotted by a resident's trail camera and by drones operated by law enforcement. The capture of and charges against Boelter were announced at a press conference led by the U.S. Attorney for the District of Minnesota, Joseph H. Thompson, on June 16.

On July 23, 2026, Vance Luther Boelter was sentenced to two consecutive life terms plus 40 years in prison for the politically motivated crime. Boelter pled guilty to federal charges in June 2026 to avoid the death penalty. Separate state charges, including murder, attempted murder, and animal cruelty remain pending as of July.

=== Memorials, lying in state, and funeral ===
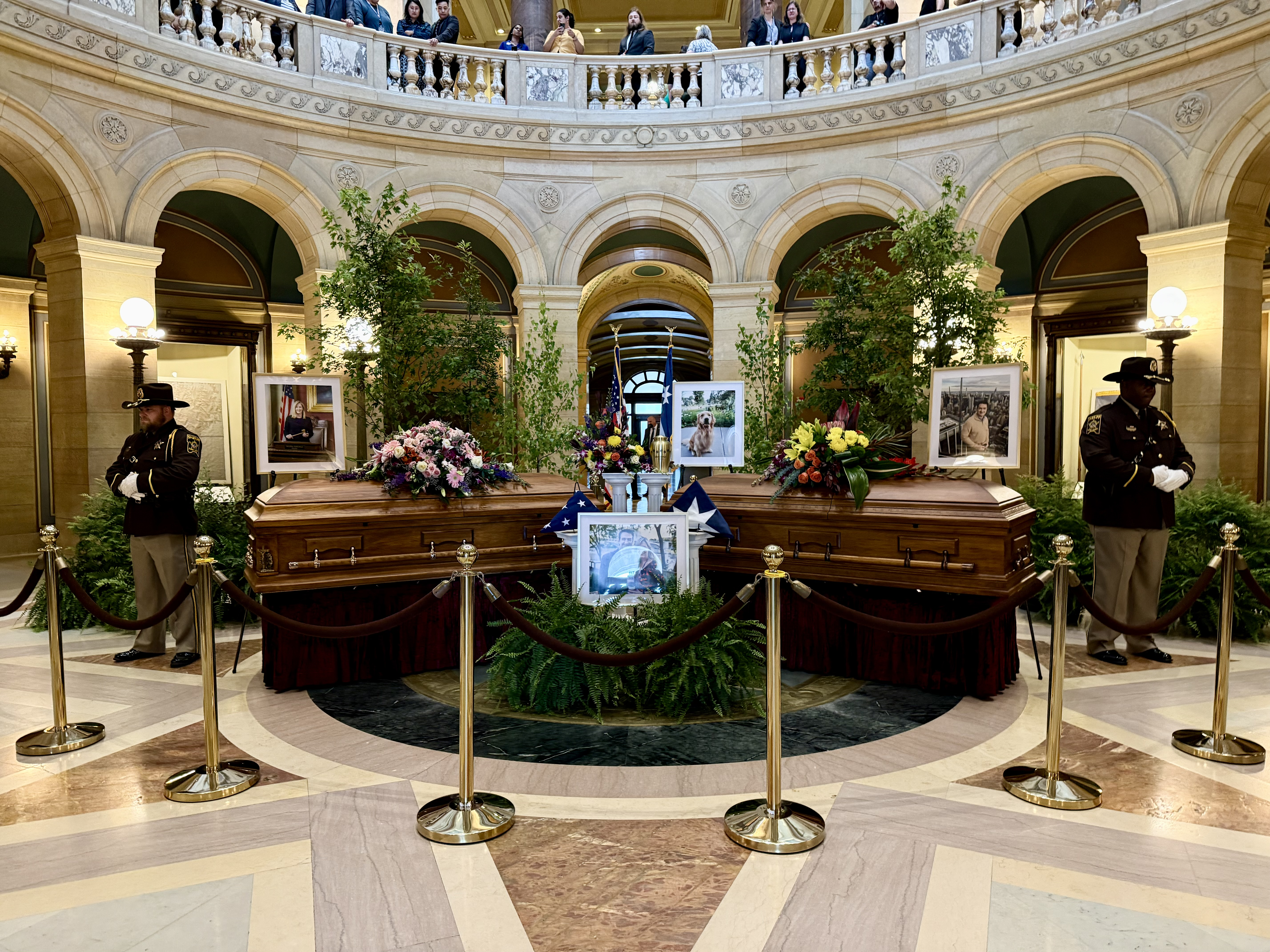
Melissa Hortman, her husband Mark, and their dog Gilbert all lying in state at the Minnesota State Capitol

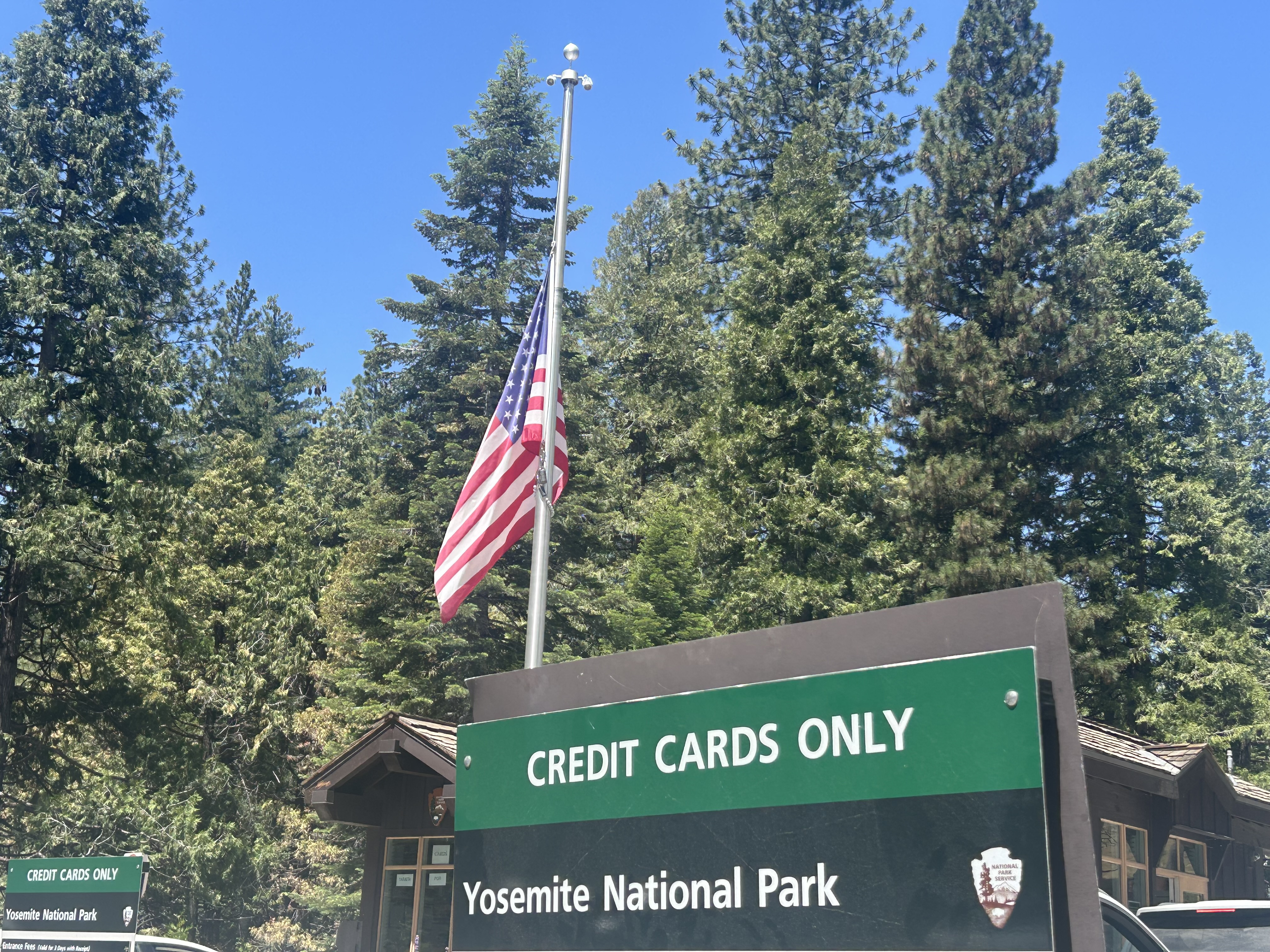
A flag at Yosemite National Park flying at half-staff on June 16 after Hortman's assassination

Flowers, notes, and pictures were left at the Minnesota State Capitol to memorialize Hortman. President Donald Trump issued a statement on the day of the murders. On June 16, Sophie and Colin Hortman, the children of Melissa and Mark, issued a statement calling for "hope and resilience". Red roses, a photograph, and a gavel were placed on her desk. On June 17, a formal procession of law enforcement vehicles transported the bodies of Hortman and her husband to a funeral home in Minneapolis. Remarks by U.S. Senate Minority Leader Chuck Schumer, Senate Minority Whip Dick Durbin, Senators Amy Klobuchar and Tina Smith, and Representative Kelly Morrison were read into the Congressional record.

On the evening of June 18, a candlelight vigil was held on the Minnesota State Capitol steps. Minnesota lawmakers and Governor Walz and his wife attended.

Melissa Hortman, Mark Hortman and the ashes of their dog Gilbert lay in state in the Minnesota State Capitol rotunda on June 27. Melissa Hortman was the first woman to receive that honor, and Mark Hortman was the first non-public official or veteran, and Gilbert the first animal, to receive that honor. Former President Joe Biden came through the line to pay respects to the Hortmans; Walz and his wife were among the first in line of 7,500 for the viewing.

The funeral took place at the Basilica of Saint Mary in Minneapolis on June 28. Attendees included former U.S. President Joe Biden and former Vice President Kamala Harris, along with Governor Tim Walz, Minnesota Attorney General Keith Ellison, Lieutenant Governor Peggy Flanagan, First Lady Gwen Walz, Second Gentleman Tom Weber, and former Governor Mark Dayton. Current and former state legislators from both parties and other elected officials were among the 1,500 people in attendance. Walz gave a eulogy and the Hortmans' children made remarks, as well as serving as pallbearers along with Minnesota state representative Zack Stephenson. Also present were Archbishop Bernard Hebda, of the Archdiocese of Saint Paul and Minneapolis, and Richard Pates, ninth bishop of the Diocese of Des Moines. The service concluded with a state honors ceremony, including a flyover and tolling of the bells. Representative John Hoffman and his family issued a statement after the funeral. Hortman's love of gardening was honored with pins of trees or shrubs for all funeral attendees, a tree planting initiative, and the I-35W bridge lit green on June 27 and 28.

On the first day of its 2026 session, the Minnesota Legislature held a ceremony honoring Hortman.

== Honors and accolades ==
In 2019, the Minnesota Milk Producers Association recognized Hortman as its Legislator of the Year for her work "securing the 2019 Agriculture, Rural Development, and Housing budget which included investing $8 million for the Dairy Assistance Investment, and Relief Initiative". Hortman won awards from the 2020 caucus for her bipartisan work. She also won awards from Conservation Minnesota.

In 2023, Hortman was honored at the Humphrey-Mondale Awards and received the Joan and Walter Mondale Award for Public Service. In 2026, the Melissa & Mark Hortman Award for Dedication and Leadership in Public Policy was created as a sixth Humphrey-Mondale Award in honor of the Hortmans. The award's first recipients were Hortman's senior staff.

== Electoral history ==
=== Minnesota House, district 47B (2004–2010) ===
Year	Election	Date	Elected				Defeated				Total	Plurality
2002	General	Nov. 5	Stephanie Olsen	Rep.	8,850	51.67%	Melissa Hortman	DFL	7,467	43.60%	17,127	1,383
2002	General	Nov. 5	Stephanie Olsen	Rep.	8,850	51.67%	Adam M. Roesch	Ind.	797	4.65%	17,127	1,383
2004	General	Nov. 2	Melissa Hortman	DFL	10,846	50.90%	Stephanie Olsen (inc)	Rep.	10,444	49.01%	21,309	402
2006	General	Nov. 7	Melissa Hortman (inc)	DFL	9,269	55.86%	Andrew Reinhardt	Rep.	7,301	44.00%	16,593	1,968
2008	General	Nov. 4	Melissa Hortman (inc)	DFL	12,382	54.74%	Andrew Reinhardt	Rep.	10,187	45.04%	22,619	2,195
2010	General	Nov. 2	Melissa Hortman (inc)	DFL	8,278	51.30%	Linda Etim	Rep.	7,030	43.56%	16,137	1,248
2010	General	Nov. 2	Melissa Hortman (inc)	DFL	8,278	51.30%	Don Hallblade	Ind.	822	5.09%	16,137	1,248

=== Minnesota House, district 36B (2012–2020) ===
Year	Election	Date	Elected				Defeated				Total	Plurality
2012	General	Nov. 6	Melissa Hortman (inc)	DFL	11,679	55.22%	Andrew Reinhardt	Rep.	8,555	40.45%	21,150	3,124
2012	General	Nov. 6	Melissa Hortman (inc)	DFL	11,679	55.22%	Andrew Kratoska	Ind.	891	4.21%	21,150	3,124
2014	General	Nov. 4	Melissa Hortman (inc)	DFL	7,407	51.90%	Peter Crema	Rep.	6,851	48.00%	14,272	556
2016	General	Nov. 8	Melissa Hortman (inc)	DFL	12,064	55.66%	Peter Crema	Rep.	9,560	44.11%	21,673	2,504
2018	General	Nov. 6	Melissa Hortman (inc)	DFL	12,514	63.05%	Jermain A. Botsio	Rep.	7,302	36.79%	19,849	5,212
2020	General	Nov. 3	Melissa Hortman (inc)	DFL	15,076	60.45%	Scott Simmons	Rep.	9,828	39.41%	24,938	5,248

=== Minnesota House, district 34B (2022, 2024) ===
Year	Election	Date	Elected				Defeated				Total	Plurality
2022	General	Nov. 8	Melissa Hortman (inc)	DFL	10,469	62.48%	Scott Simmons	Rep.	6,268	37.41%	16,756	4,201
2024	General	Nov. 5	Melissa Hortman (inc)	DFL	13,649	63.08%	Scott Simmons	Rep.	7,950	36.74%	21,639	5,699

== See also ==
- List of speakers of the Minnesota House of Representatives

Minnesota House of Representatives
Preceded by Paul Thissen	Minority Leader of the Minnesota House of Representatives; 2017–2019	Succeeded by Kurt Daudt
Preceded by Lisa Demuth	Minority Leader of the Minnesota House of Representatives; 2025	Succeeded by Zack Stephenson
Political offices
Preceded by Kurt Daudt	Speaker of the Minnesota House of Representatives; 2019–2025	Succeeded by Lisa Demuth
