= John Hoffman (Minnesota politician) =

American politician (born 1965)

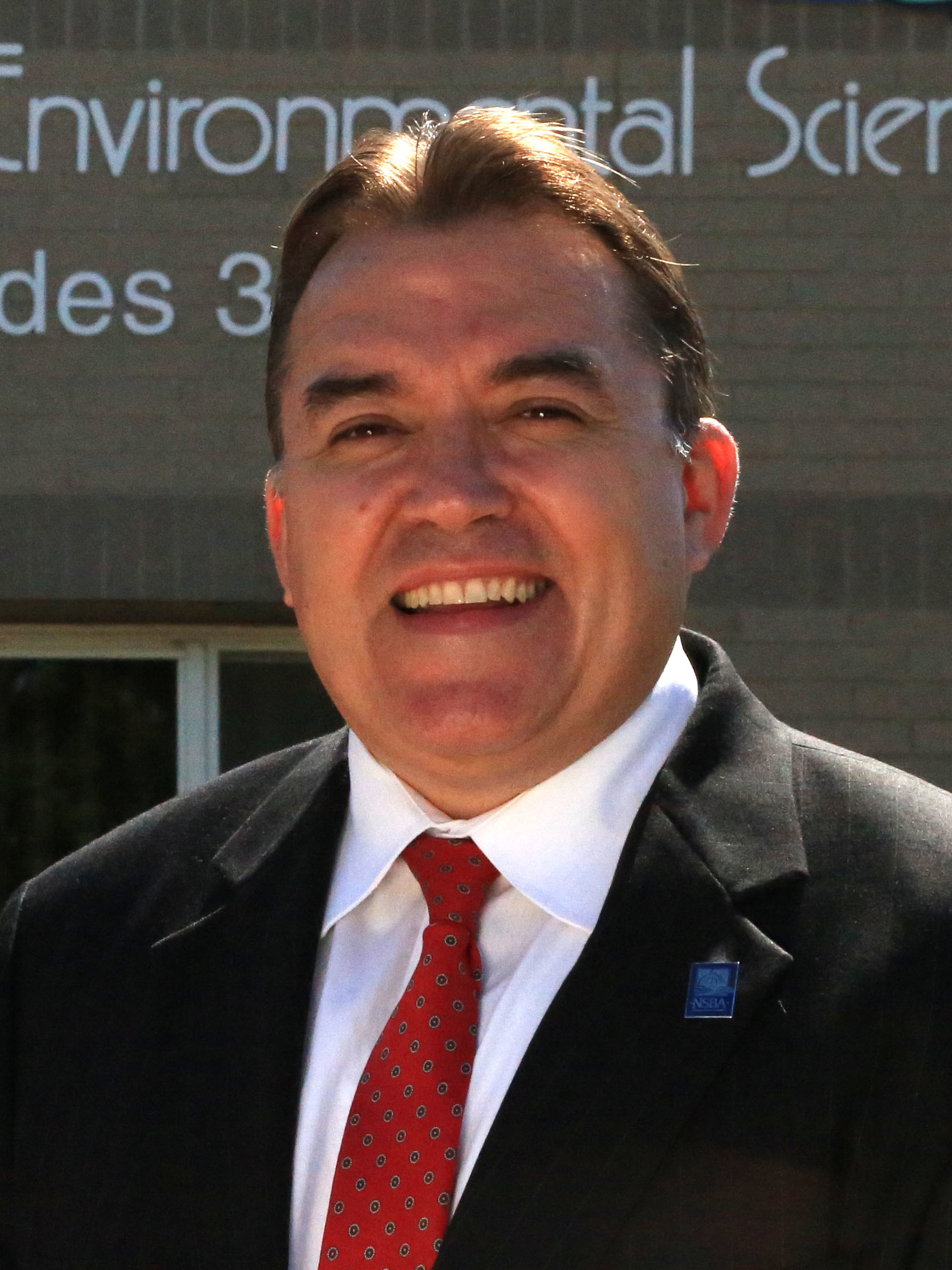
- Hoffman in 2014

Member of the Minnesota Senate
- Incumbent
- Assumed office January 8, 2013
- Preceded by: Benjamin Kruse (redistricted)
- Constituency: 36th district (2013–2023); 34th district (2023–present)

Personal details
- Born: January 17, 1965 (age 61) Casper, Wyoming, U.S.
- Party: Democratic (DFL)
- Spouse: Yvette Hoffman
- Children: 1
- Education: Minnesota State University, Mankato (attended); Saint Mary's University of Minnesota (BA)
- Website: State Senate website Campaign website

John A. Hoffman (born January 17, 1965) is an American politician and member of the Minnesota Senate. A member of the Minnesota Democratic–Farmer–Labor Party (DFL), he represents District 34, which includes parts of Anoka and Hennepin County in the Twin Cities metropolitan area.

Hoffman and his wife, along with fellow Minnesota lawmaker Melissa Hortman and her husband, were shot in a 2025 spree shooting. Hoffman and his wife were hospitalized; neither Hortman nor her husband survived.

== Early life and career ==
Hoffman was born in Casper, Wyoming, on January 17, 1965. Before being elected to the Minnesota Legislature, he served as a member of the Anoka-Hennepin School District Board, beginning in 2005.

Before that, Hoffman was a member of the Federal Interagency Coordinating Council, assisting and advising Cabinet members on their response to children from birth to age eight, especially those with special health-care needs.

== Minnesota Senate ==
Hoffman was first elected to the Minnesota Senate seat representing the 36th district in 2012, defeating incumbent Benjamin Kruse. He was reelected in 2016, 2020, and 2022. Due to redistricting before the election, Hoffman was elected to represent the 34th district in 2022. Hoffman served as the minority whip from 2017 to 2020. He currently chairs the Human Services Committee.

== Assassination attempt ==
On June 14, 2025, 57-year-old Vance Boelter shot Hoffman nine times and his wife, Yvette, eight times at their home. They were both hospitalized. Boelter later murdered Minnesota State Representative Melissa Hortman and her husband at their home. Both Hoffmans underwent emergency surgery, and Yvette's condition was initially described as "unclear".

On June 15, Boelter was arrested. On June 16, the capture of and charges against Boelter were announced at a press conference led by US Attorney for the District of Minnesota Joseph H. Thompson.

On June 19, Hoffman and his wife released a joint statement describing the details of the assassination attempt and their heartbreak at the loss of the Hortmans. The same day, Yvette Hoffman was released from the hospital.

After three weeks in the ICU, in July 2025, Hoffman was released from the hospital and transferred to a rehabilitation facility to continue his recovery.

On August 25, 2025, Hoffman made his first public appearance since the shooting speaking at the Democratic National Committee's summer meeting in Minneapolis.

== Electoral history ==
2012 Minnesota Senate district 36 election
Party	Candidate	Votes	%
Democratic (DFL)	John Hoffman	22,194	53.20%
Republican	Benjamin Kruse	19,522	46.80%
Total votes		41,716	100.00%
Democratic (DFL) gain from Republican			

2016 Minnesota Senate district 36 election
Party	Candidate	Votes	%
Democratic (DFL)	John Hoffman (incumbent)	21,793	51.12%
Republican	Jeffrey Lunde	20,840	48.88%
Total votes		42,633	100.00%
Democratic (DFL) hold			

2020 Minnesota Senate district 36 election
Party	Candidate	Votes	%
Democratic (DFL)	John Hoffman (incumbent)	27,580	56.40%
Republican	Karen Attia	21,319	43.60%
Total votes		48,899	100.00%
Democratic (DFL) hold			

2022 Minnesota Senate district 34 election
Party	Candidate	Votes	%
Democratic (DFL)	John Hoffman (incumbent)	20,925	54.91%
Republican	Karen Attia	17,181	45.09%
Total votes		38,106	100.00%
Democratic (DFL) hold			
