= Champlin, Minnesota =

City in Minnesota, United States

- City
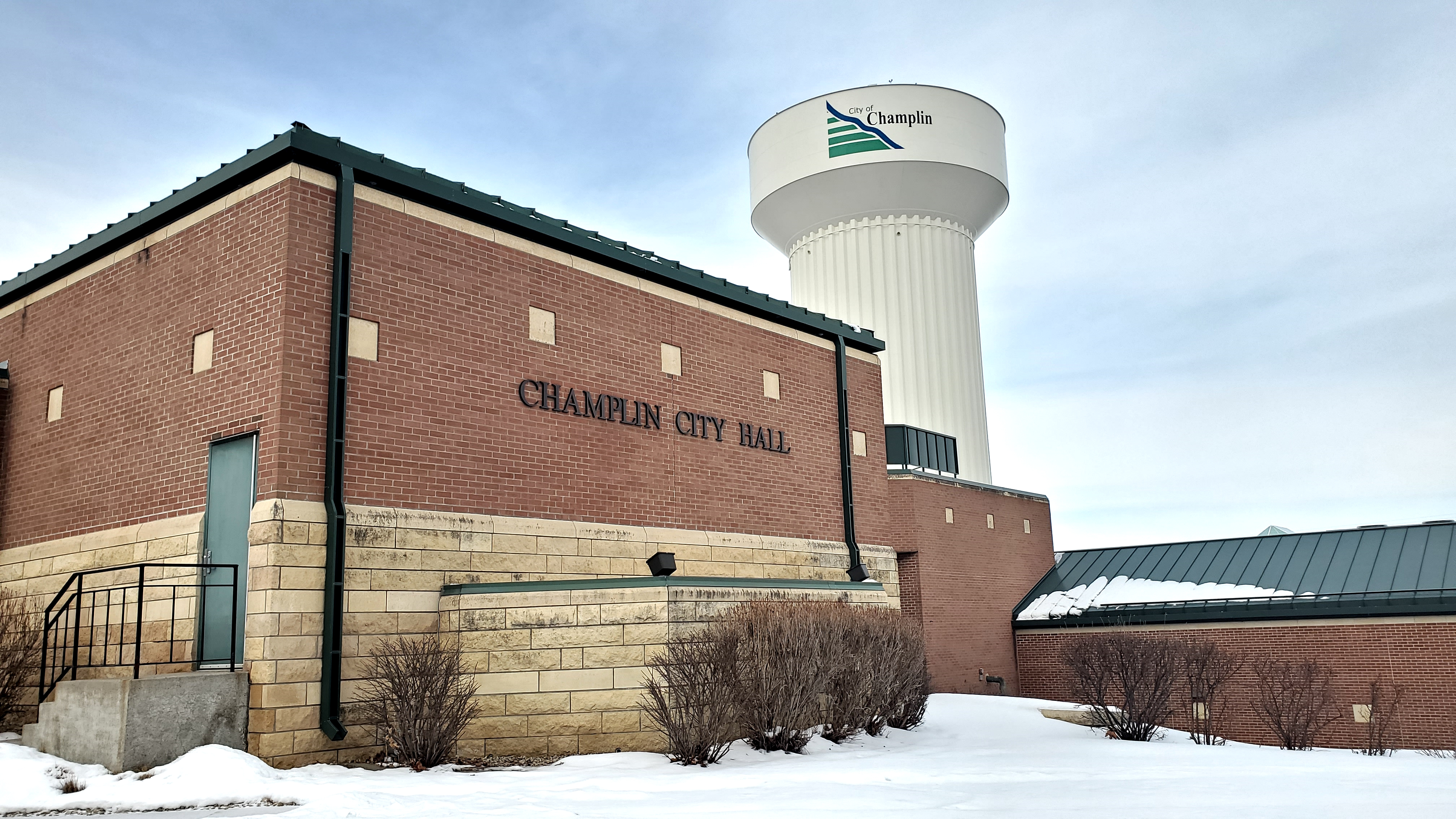

- Logo

- Location of the city of Champlin within Hennepin County, Minnesota
- Coordinates: 45°11′20″N 93°23′51″W
- Country: United States
- State: Minnesota
- County: Hennepin
- Founded: 1852
- Incorporated (town): 1859
- Incorporated (city): 1971

Government
  - Mayor: Ryan Sabas

Area
  - Total: 8.71 sq mi (22.55 km^{2})
  - Land: 8.15 sq mi (21.11 km^{2})
  - Water: 0.56 sq mi (1.44 km^{2}) 6.41%
- Elevation: 850 ft (260 m)

Population (2020)
  - Total: 23,919
  - Estimate (2022): 23,112
  - Density: 2,930/sq mi (1,133/km^{2})
- Time zone: UTC−6 (Central (CST))
  - Summer (DST): UTC−5 (CDT)
- ZIP code: 55316
- Area code: 763
- FIPS code: 27-10846
- GNIS feature ID: 0641097
- Sales tax: 8.525%
- Website: www.champlinmn.gov

Champlin (/ˈtʃæmplɪn/ CHAMP-lin) is a city in Hennepin County, Minnesota, United States. The population was 23,919 at the 2020 census. Champlin is a northern suburb of Minneapolis.

U.S. Highway 169 and Hennepin County Road 12 (CR 12) are two of the main routes in Champlin.

== Geography ==
Champlin lies along the Mississippi River, surrounded by the cities of Anoka, Dayton, Brooklyn Park, Maple Grove and Coon Rapids, 18 miles (29 km) northwest of Minneapolis.

According to the United States Census Bureau, the city has an area of 8.73 square miles (22.61 km^{2}), of which 8.17 square miles (21.16 km^{2}) is land and 0.56 square miles (1.45 km^{2}) is water.

The average elevation is 875 feet (267 m) above sea level, and the Mississippi River is approximately one-eighth of a mile wide throughout Champlin.

== History ==
The Champlin area was first settled when Father Louis Hennepin, a Franciscan priest from whom Hennepin County gets its name, Michael Accult, and Peter Dulay were captured by Lakota Indians. An Indian trading post was later established in the area. Charles Miles created the first permanent settlement in what came to be named Marshall Township. In 1859, it was split into two towns, Champlin and Dayton.

Champlin's name came from U.S. Navy Commodore Stephen Champlin. He was active in the war against England and Canada in 1812 and in the establishment of the Canadian–United States boundary. He died in 1870 in Buffalo, New York.

On August 30, 1853, Stephen Champlin's daughter, Eliza Ellen Champlin, married John B. Cook, a partner of Minnesota's Alexander Ramsey. Cook never resided in Champlin, but he was involved in real estate transactions there and in its incorporation. In 1947, part of the former Champlin Township was incorporated to form the village of Champlin, and on January 2, 1971, as the result of a petitioned order from the Minnesota Municipal Commission, Champlin Township and the village of Champlin consolidated to form the city of Champlin.

== Education ==
Champlin is served by Anoka-Hennepin School District 11. Four public schools are in the area: Champlin-Brooklyn Park Academy for Math and Environmental Science, Oxbow Creek Elementary, Jackson Middle School, and Champlin Park High School. All four are in a neighborhood near the intersection of 109th Avenue North and Douglas Avenue North. Oxbow Creek Elementary School is in Brooklyn Park. Champlin Park High School was at one point the state's largest high school.

== Demographics ==
Historical population
Census	Pop.	Note	%±
1880	246		—
1890	325		32.1%
1950	828		—
1960	1,271		53.5%
1970	2,275		79.0%
1980	9,006		295.9%
1990	16,849		87.1%
2000	22,193		31.7%
2010	23,089		4.0%
2020	23,919		3.6%
2022 (est.)	23,112		−3.4%
U.S. Decennial Census; 2020 Census

Historical population
Census	Pop.	Note	%±
1860	198		—
1870	292		47.5%
1880	456		56.2%
1890	620		36.0%
1900	653		5.3%
1910	579		−11.3%
1920	583		0.7%
1930	663		13.7%
1940	816		23.1%
1950	572		−29.9%
1960	822		43.7%
1970	2,429		195.5%
2020	23,919		—
U.S. Census for Champlin Township

=== 2020 census ===
As of the 2020 census, Champlin had a population of 23,919. The median age was 40.2 years. 23.0% of residents were under the age of 18 and 13.9% of residents were 65 years of age or older. For every 100 females there were 97.3 males, and for every 100 females age 18 and over there were 95.7 males age 18 and over.

100.0% of residents lived in urban areas, while 0.0% lived in rural areas.

There were 8,879 households in Champlin, of which 33.1% had children under the age of 18 living in them. Of all households, 59.6% were married-couple households, 13.1% were households with a male householder and no spouse or partner present, and 20.9% were households with a female householder and no spouse or partner present. About 20.1% of all households were made up of individuals and 8.6% had someone living alone who was 65 years of age or older.

There were 9,120 housing units, of which 2.6% were vacant. The homeowner vacancy rate was 0.4% and the rental vacancy rate was 9.9%.

Racial composition as of the 2020 census
Race	Number	Percent
White	18,858	78.8%
Black or African American	1,966	8.2%
American Indian and Alaska Native	113	0.5%
Asian	1,145	4.8%
Native Hawaiian and Other Pacific Islander	1	0.0%
Some other race	400	1.7%
Two or more races	1,436	6.0%
Hispanic or Latino (of any race)	847	3.5%

=== 2010 census ===
As of the census of 2010, there were 24,710 people, 8,328 households, and 6,305 families living in the city. The population density was 2,826.1 inhabitants per square mile (1,091.2/km^{2}). There were 8,598 housing units at an average density of 1,052.4 per square mile (406.3/km^{2}). The racial makeup of the city was 89.0% White, 4.8% African American, 0.4% Native American, 3.1% Asian, 0.5% from other races, and 2.2% from two or more races. Hispanic or Latino of any race were 2.0% of the population.

There were 8,328 households, of which 40.5% had children under the age of 18 living with them, 61.4% were married couples living together, 9.6% had a female householder with no husband present, 4.7% had a male householder with no wife present, and 24.3% were non-families. 18.8% of all households were made up of individuals, and 5.6% had someone living alone who was 65 years of age or older. The average household size was 2.77 and the average family size was 3.18.

The median age in the city was 36.8 years. 26.9% of residents were under the age of 18; 8.8% were between the ages of 18 and 24; 27.1% were from 25 to 44; 30.5% were from 45 to 64; and 6.7% were 65 years of age or older. The gender makeup of the city was 50.2% male and 49.8% female.

=== 2000 census ===
As of the census of 2000, there were 22,193 people, 7,425 households, and 5,925 families living in the city. The population density was 2,713.9 inhabitants per square mile (1,047.8/km^{2}). There were 7,514 housing units at an average density of 918.8 per square mile (354.8/km^{2}). The racial makeup of the city was 95.01% White, 1.41% African-American, 0.43% Native American, 1.65% Asian, 0.02% Pacific Islander, 0.37% from other races, and 1.10% from two or more races. Hispanic or Latino of any race were 1.13% of the population.

There were 7,425 households, out of which 50.5% had children under the age of 18 living with them, 67.4% were married couples living together, 8.6% had a female householder with no husband present, and 20.2% were non-families. 14.9% of all households were made up of individuals, and 2.6% had someone living alone who was 65 years of age or older. The average household size was 2.99 and the average family size was 3.35.

In the city, the population was spread out, with 33.6% under the age of 18, 7.0% from 18 to 24, 38.4% from 25 to 44, 17.4% from 45 to 64, and 3.7% who were 65 years of age or older. The median age was 32 years. For every 100 females, there were 101.5 males. For every 100 females age 18 and over, there were 99.4 males.

The median income for a household in the city was $85,831, and the median income for a family was $98,890. Males had a median income of $45,390 versus $32,277 for females. The per capita income for the city was $24,041. About 2.3% of families and 2.5% of the population were below the poverty line, including 3.5% of those under age 18 and 0.8% of those age 65 or over.

== Government ==
=== City Council ===
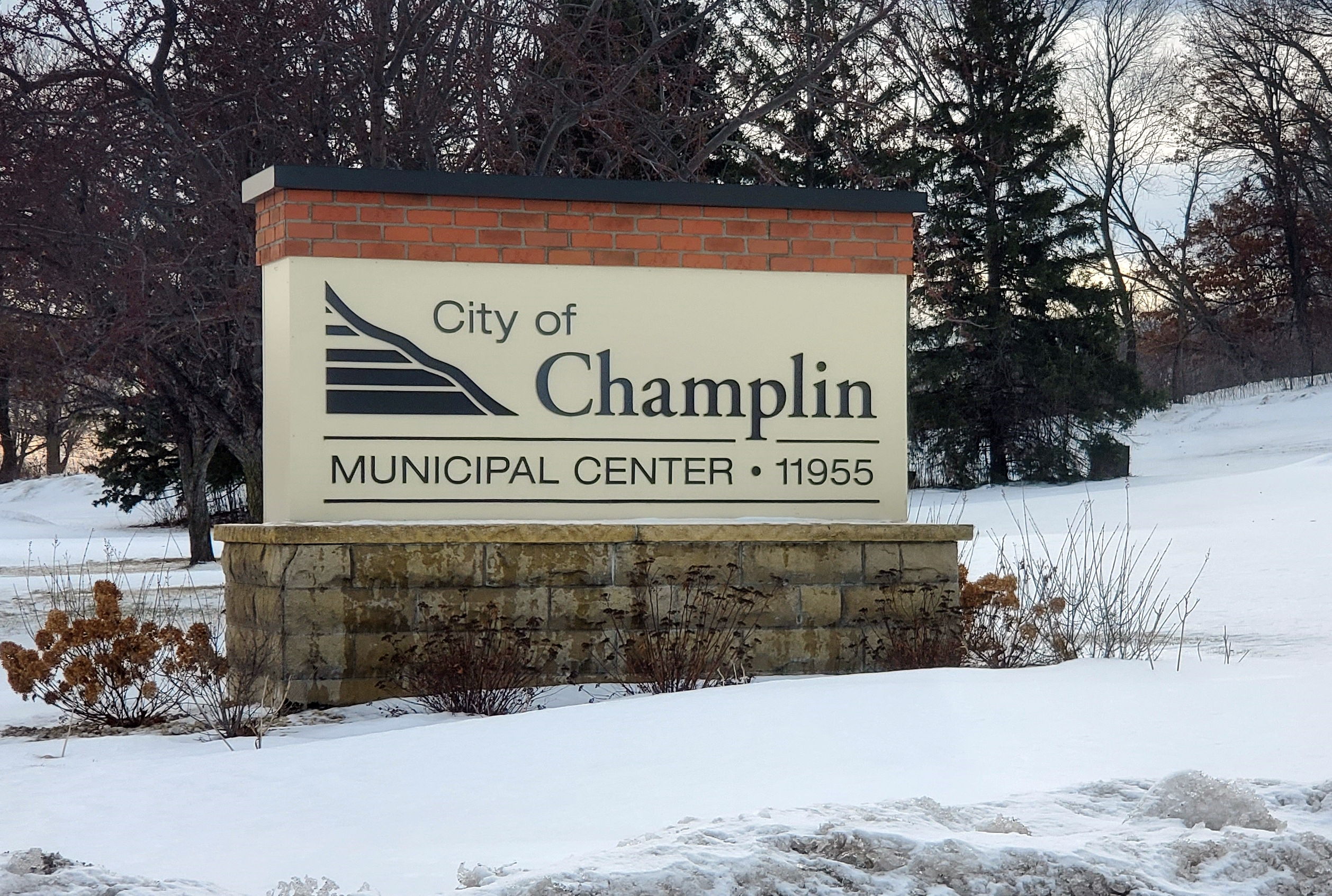
Champlin Municipal Center

The mayor of Champlin is Ryan Sabas. He serves on the Champlin City Council along with Ward 1 council member Jessica Tesdall, Ward 2 council member Tom Moe, Ward 3 council member Rachel Wales, and Ward 4 council member Lorraine Coan.

=== Administration ===
Champlin is managed on a daily basis by the city administrator and subordinate department heads. The city administrator is Jenny Max.

=== Police ===
The Champlin Police Department has 30 sworn officers, two community service officers, 8 police explorers, and a civilian support staff of three full-time and three part-time employees. Champlin police officers are dispatched via the Hennepin County Sheriff's Department Communication Division in Golden Valley. The police department is on the city campus at 11955 Champlin Drive.

The police department moved to the Champlin Public Safety Facility in 2008. The facility gives the department adequate space and facilities into the foreseeable future. It includes indoor parking and storage to protect police vehicles.

=== Fire ===
Champlin's fire services are provided by the joint Anoka-Champlin Fire Department. Champlin and Anoka have shared a fire department since 1985, with individual fire stations in each city. The Anoka-Champlin Fire Department moved to the Champlin Public Safety Facility in 2008. The facility has three fire truck bays and should meet the city's fire protection needs for the foreseeable future.

The fire department has 41 volunteer firefighters. Averaging 680 calls per year, the department covers 16 square miles (41 km^{2}) with two aerial trucks, four engines, two grass rigs, two tankers, two boats, one command/rescue truck, two hazardous materials trailers, one Homeland Security truck, one ice rescue sled, and two squads.

One of the state's most traditional fire departments, the Anoka-Champlin Fire Department is distinguished by its tradition of using white vehicles, a nod to the days when Anoka firefighters used white horses to pull their steam fire engines. When motorized vehicles replaced the horse-drawn engines, the department selected white for the color of its motorized equipment.

=== Potential secession from Hennepin County ===
On August 31, 2023, the Champlin City Council held a joint meeting with nearby Dayton to discuss both the city's potential secession from Hennepin County and into neighboring Anoka County. Champlin Mayor Ryan Sabas has said that Hennepin County has not repaid Champlin's donations to its infrastructure projects and that one-third of residents' local taxes are sent to the Hennepin County government. Sabas also cited frustration with the county not spending enough money on transportation in the community. Secession would require input from voters, and as of September 2023 has not been approved.

== Notable people ==
- John Hoffman (born January 17, 1965) Minnesota Senate member
- Darby Nelson (1940 – 2022), writer and politician, lived in Champlin.
- Kimberly Potter (born June 18, 1972), former Brooklyn Center police officer and veteran since 1995, who accidentally killed 20-year-old Plymouth citizen Daunte Wright was born and raised in Champlin.

== Festival ==
Each year, generally on the second weekend in June, Champlin holds the Father Hennepin Festival. The celebration began in 1976 to recognize Champlin's history. The festival was canceled in 2025 in the wake of the attack on John Hoffman and Melissa Hortman.

== Recreation ==
The Champlin Mill Pond is within city limits on the northeast corner of 169 and Hayden Lake Road. It is stocked with several species of panfish by the Minnesota DNR, and has a fishing pier, pavilion and park with picnic tables and grills.
