= Green Isle, Minnesota =

City in Minnesota, United States

- City
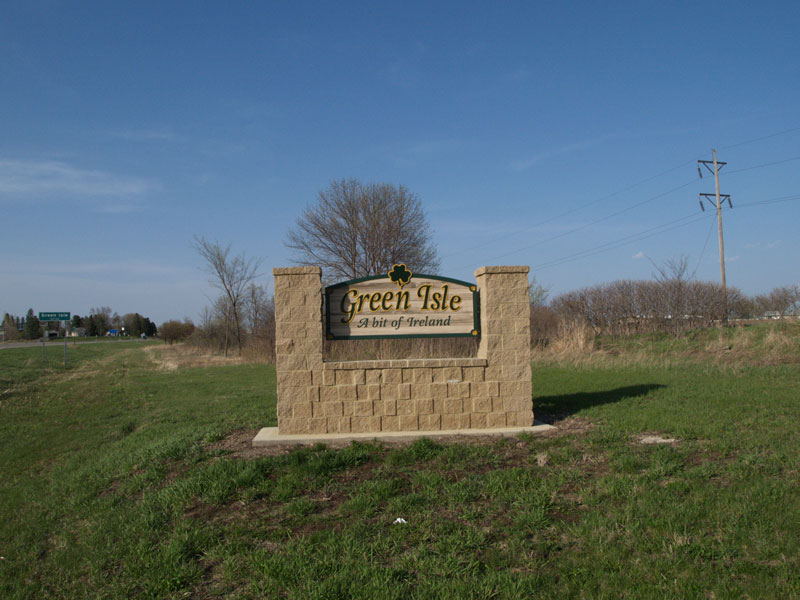
- Green Isle, Minnesota city sign
- Motto: "A Bit Of Ireland"
- Location of Green Isle within Sibley County, Minnesota
- Coordinates: 44°40′49″N 94°00′19″W
- Country: United States
- State: Minnesota
- County: Sibley

Government
  - Type: Mayor – Council
  - Mayor: Shane Sheets

Area
  - Total: 1.02 sq mi (2.65 km^{2})
  - Land: 1.02 sq mi (2.63 km^{2})
  - Water: 0.0077 sq mi (0.02 km^{2})
- Elevation: 991 ft (302 m)

Population (2020)
  - Total: 591
  - Density: 582.2/sq mi (224.77/km^{2})
- Time zone: UTC-6 (Central (CST))
  - Summer (DST): UTC-5 (CDT)
- ZIP code: 55338
- Area code: 507
- FIPS code: 27-25658
- GNIS feature ID: 2394976
- Website: www.greenislemn.gov

Green Isle is a city in Sibley County, Minnesota, United States. The population was 522 at the 2020 census.

== History ==
The Minneapolis and St. Louis Railway (M&StL) originally built the railroad tracks between Norwood and Morton circa 1880. Green Isle was platted in 1881, incorporating these northeast/southwest-oriented tracks. The town was named after the previously existing township, its name alluding to Ireland, the Emerald Isle, as many of its earliest settlers were from Ireland.

On June 15, 2025, 57-year-old Vance Luther Boelter was arrested in connection with the 2025 shootings of Minnesota legislators in a wooded area near Boelter's property in Green Isle. The manhunt was described by Brooklyn Park police Chief Mark Bruley as "the largest manhunt in state history."

== Geography ==
According to the United States Census Bureau, the city has an area of 0.98 square miles (2.54 km^{2}), all land. Minnesota State Highways 5 and 25 are two of the main routes in the community.

== Demographics ==
Historical population
Census	Pop.	Note	%±
1890	219		—
1900	275		25.6%
1910	256		−6.9%
1920	262		2.3%
1930	300		14.5%
1940	376		25.3%
1950	332		−11.7%
1960	331		−0.3%
1970	363		9.7%
1980	357		−1.7%
1990	239		−33.1%
2000	334		39.7%
2010	559		67.4%
2020	591		5.7%
U.S. Decennial Census;

=== 2010 census ===
As of the census of 2010, there were 559 people, 218 households, and 154 families residing in the city. The population density was 570.4 inhabitants per square mile (220.2/km^{2}). There were 240 housing units at an average density of 244.9 per square mile (94.6/km^{2}). The racial makeup of the city was 98.2% White, 0.4% African American, 0.2% Native American, 0.9% from other races, and 0.4% from two or more races. Hispanic or Latino of any race were 3.0% of the population.

There were 218 households, of which 39.9% had children under 18 living with them, 51.8% were married couples living together, 11.5% had a female householder with no husband present, 7.3% had a male householder with no wife present, and 29.4% were non-families. 22.9% of all households were made up of individuals, and 6.4% had someone living alone who 65 or older. The average household size was 2.56 and the average family size was 2.98.

The median age in the city was 32.1. 30.2% of residents were under 18; 5.1% were between 18 and 24; 36.9% were from 25 to 44; 16% were from 45 to 64; and 12% were 65 or older. The gender makeup of the city was 48.8% male and 51.2% female.

=== 2000 census ===
As of the census of 2000, there were 334 people, 136 households, and 102 families residing in the city. The population density was 447.5 inhabitants per square mile (172.8/km^{2}). There were 141 housing units at an average density of 188.9 per square mile (72.9/km^{2}). The racial makeup of the city was 98.50% White, 0.30% African American, 0.90% Asian, 0.30% from other races. Hispanic or Latino of any race were 3.59% of the population.

There were 136 households, of which 33.1% had children under 18 living with them, 65.4% were married couples living together, 5.9% had a female householder with no husband present, and 25.0% were non-families. 22.8% of all households were made up of individuals, and 11.0% had someone living alone who was 65 or older. The average household size was 2.46 and the average family size was 2.89.

In the city, the population was spread out, with 24.9% under 18, 7.5% from 18 to 24, 32.6% from 25 to 44, 18.3% from 45 to 64, and 16.8% who were 65 or older. The median age was 36. For every 100 females, there were 108.8 males. For every 100 females 18 and over, there were 110.9 males.

The median income for a household in the city was $44,792, and the median income for a family was $51,964. Males had a median income of $31,979 versus $25,625 for females. The per capita income was $25,537. About 1.8% of families and 2.5% of the population were below the poverty line, including none of those under 18 and 11.8% of those 65 or over.

== Government ==
The city operates under a mayor/council system with Shane Sheets serving as mayor since January 2023.

== Education ==
Green Isle is in the Sibley East School District. The district's comprehensive high school is Sibley East High School.
