= Joe Shiely Sr =

American contractor and city activist (1885–1972)

Joseph Leo Shiely Sr
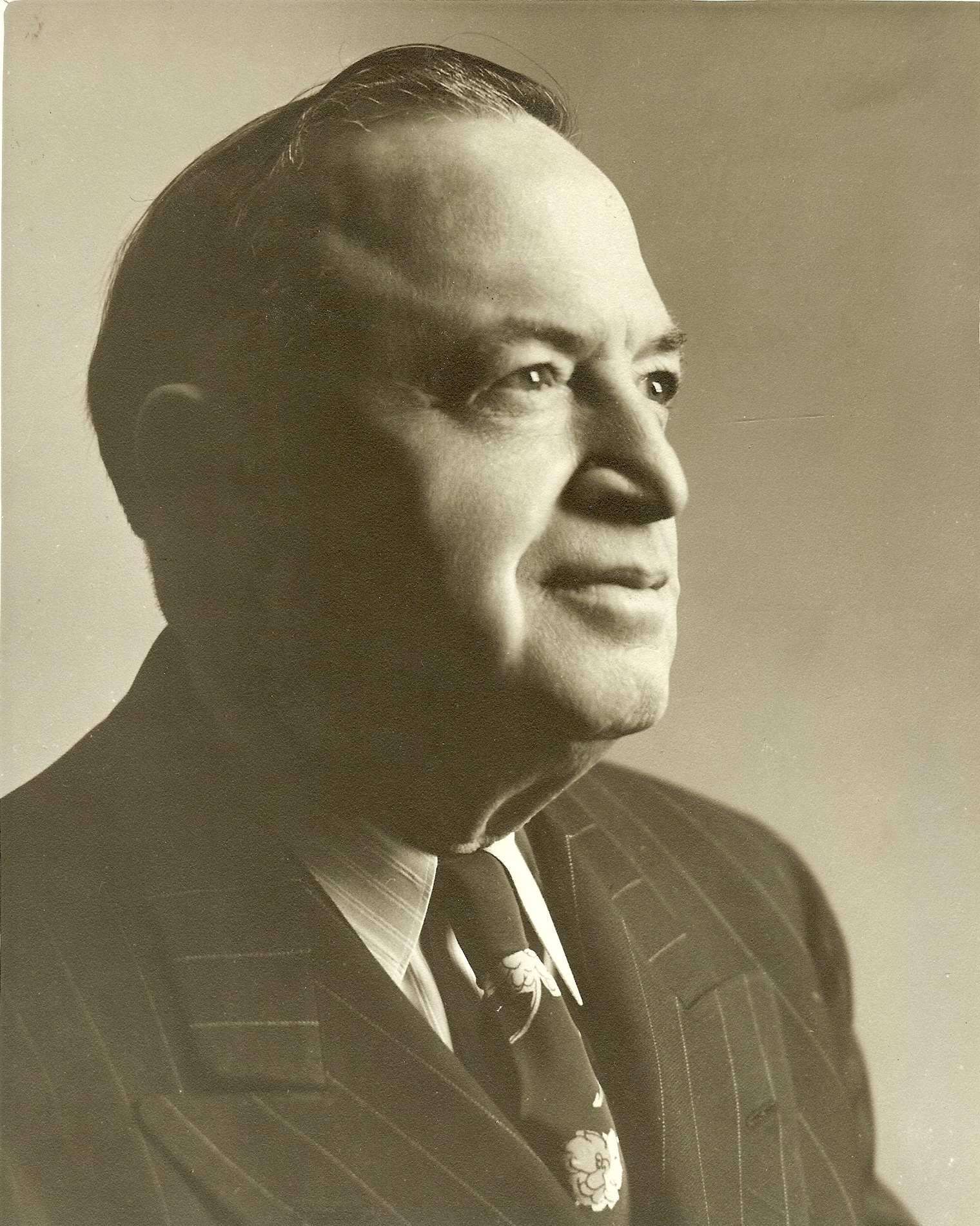
- Born: Joseph Leo Shiely Sr; January 30, 1885; St. Paul, Minnesota, U.S.
- Died: January 15, 1972 (aged 86); St. Paul, Minnesota, U.S.
- Occupations: Sand and Gravel contractor
- Spouse: Mary Elizabeth Shiely
- Children: 5

Joseph Leo Shiely (January 30, 1885 – January 15, 1972) was an American contractor known as "The Gravel King". He was the founder and chief executive officer of The Shiely Company, which contributed to the construction of the Fort Peck Dam, the Garrison Dam, and the Hanford Atomic Site.

== Biography ==
=== Childhood and youth ===
Shiely was born January 30, 1885, in St. Paul, Minnesota to James Shiely and Ellen Morrison. He grew up in the Frogtown neighborhood. His father was a contractor whose draying business pulled the marble stone from the railroad to the State Capitol and Cathedral of Saint Paul.

In 1900, Joseph Shiely worked from 7 to 8:30 a.m. in Butler Brothers & Ryan stone cutting blacksmith shop during construction of the state capitol. He attended Mechanic Arts High School the balance of the morning and returned to the blacksmith shop at 1:30 p.m. to work until 6:00 p.m., all for 50 cents a day. He left high school after three years to continue with Butler Brothers on the Minnesota Iron Range.

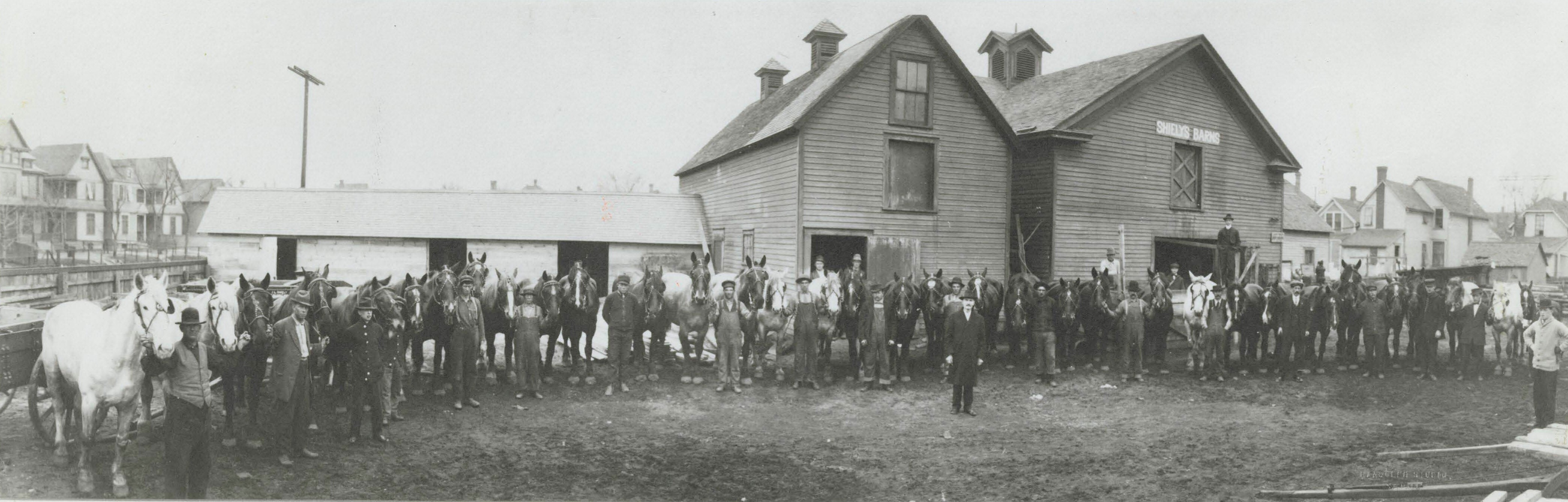
Photo of James Shiely (center) at the Shiely Barns. Features some of the horses used to move the massive marble stones from railroad to Capitol building and Cathedral.

=== Young businessman ===
In 1901, Shiely was timekeeper for Butler Brothers in Hibbing, Minnesota. A year later he became clerk and estimator for St. Paul contractors Newman & Hoy, with whom he stayed until 1908.

From 1905 to 1908 he was job foreman and superintendent of construction of buildings, bridges and dams for Newman & Hoy in Minnesota, North Dakota, and Montana. In 1908, Shiely became assistant engineer for the Northern Pacific Railway on the double-tracking from Garrison to Missoula in Montana.

Shiely became roadmaster, inspector, and concrete supervisor for the Great Northern Railway in 1909. During the following four years he supervised work on double-tracking from Summit to Java in Montana; oversaw work on Basin and Woodville tunnel linings in Montana, and Collins bridges in the same state. He was also engaged in the replacement of wooden bridges and culverts on the Great Northern main line.

Shiely often joked that he and J. J. Hill built the Great Northern Railroad. His work supplying ballast for the railroad tracks led to him amassing one of St. Paul's "most substantial fortunes."

=== Founding of the Shiely Company ===
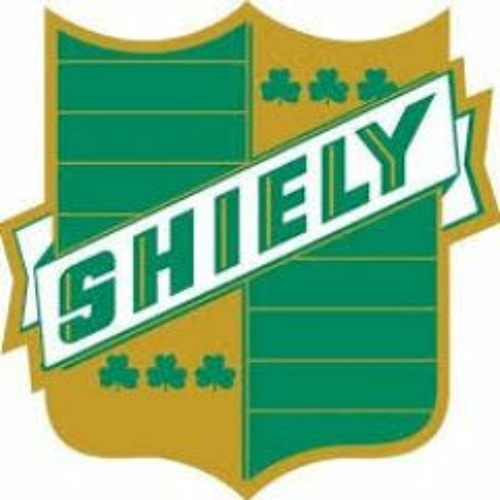
Logo of the JL Shiely Company from later decades

With a loan of $1000 along with seven horses and seven wagons, Shiely founded the JL Shiely Company alongside Dan Bell and Ray Meehan in 1916.

In 1924 the company secured a contract to build and operate eight ballast producing plants for the Great Northern Railroad. These plants were located at New London and Brookston, Minnesota; Verendrye, North Dakota; Chinook, Nimrod and Warland, Montana; Olds and Gold Bar, Washington. The contract was completed in about 1932. The company built the first ready mix concrete plant in Saint Paul in 1929. Shiely purchased the residence at 1335 Summit on St. Paul's famous Summit Avenue in 1928.

The Shiely Company was sold to English China Clays (now part of Aggregate Industries) for $72,000,000 in 1986.

=== "The Gravel King" ===
As the U.S. entered The Great Depression, Shiely looked outside of Minnesota for work for his employees. In 1932, he entered into a partnership with E.W. Hallett of Crosby, Minnesota to bid on the contract to move gravel from Cole, Montana to the site of the Fort Peck Dam. Shiely was elected the permanent chair of the newly formed National Sand and Gravel Association. The nickname "The Gravel King" appeared for the first time in a George Barton Minneapolis Tribune column in 1935.

=== Support for Saint Paul ===
Throughout the 1920s and 1930, Shiely served as the sole ambassador for St. Paul's chamber of commerce. He was known as St. Paul’s “goodwill ambassador” to communities throughout the nation and in Alaska. When the St Paul Winter Carnival went in hiatus, Shiely a new carnival starting in 1928. He would serve as King Boreas for the St Paul carnival after its revival in 1940, drawing over 300,000 people to the Capitol City.

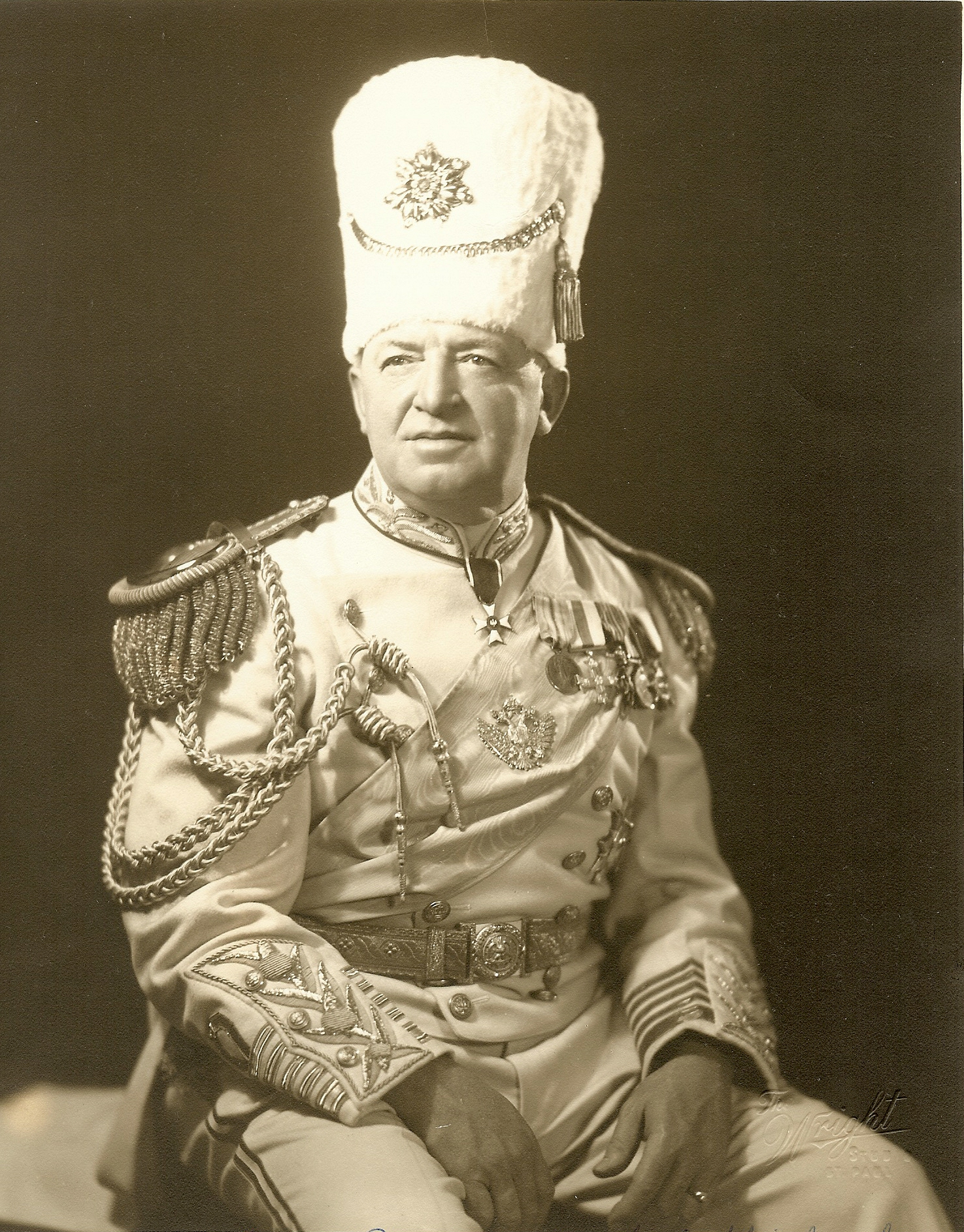
Photo of Joe Shiely Sr as King Boreas

=== Tunnel to Nina Clifford's Brothel ===
The long standing rumor of a tunnel between the Minnesota Club and Nina Clifford's brothel started when Shiely ran for President of the Prestigious Men's Club in 1931. Following the stock market collapse and the commencement of the Great Depression, the club encountered significant financial difficulties. Shiely sought innovative measures to stabilize the club's finances. Among his proposed solutions was the idea of constructing a tunnel leading to Nina’s, coupled with a turnstile system that would require a usage fee"

Many believe that the tunnel stunt was a joke, while others claim the members wives put a stop to it. Shiely won the election and paid off the Club's debts, which had escalated throughout the Great Depression.

=== Fort Peck Dam ===
In 1934, the War Department awarded the largest ever contract for sand and gravel to the Shiely- Becker County Sand And Gravel consortium as the start of the Fort Peck Dam project. The Shiely company supplied almost all of the material for the concrete for the dam, employing thousands of workers throughout the Great Depression.

=== Atomic bomb site at Hanford ===
At the start of the Atomic Era as part of the World War II war effort, Shiely joined another joint venture with United Construction Company, of Winona, Minnesota for the production of aggregate and ready mixed concrete for the DuPont Atomic Energy Plant at Hanford, Washington, where the first atomic weapon was built. Shiely and partner EW Hallett received certificates of merit from the War Department for finishing the project a year ahead of schedule, leading to a swifter end of the war.

=== Garrison Dam ===
In February 1949, the company was awarded the contract for all the coarse aggregate for Garrison Dam in North Dakota, under the U. S. Corps of Engineers. The source was designated and owned by the U. S. Fish and Wildlife Service and located on the Upper Souris Wildlife Refuge between Greene and Grano, North Dakota. Four miles of railroad were required to be constructed to the Soo Line railroad connection at Greene, North Dakota. The first shipment from the plant was on August 8, 1949 and the last shipment August 28, 1956. Over 27,000 carloads moved to the damsite by rail.

In 1951, the company was awarded a second contract by the Corps of Engineers for blanket gravel to be placed under the riprap at Garrison Dam. This contract was accomplished with the use of portable equipment from a source in Minot, North Dakota.

With dwindling reserves at their Snelling plant, in January 1950, the company entered into a long—term lease on 2,200 acres of land underlain with sand and gravel on Grey Cloud Island, 15 miles downstream on the Mississippi River from St. Paul.

=== Creating the town of Lilydale, Minnesota ===
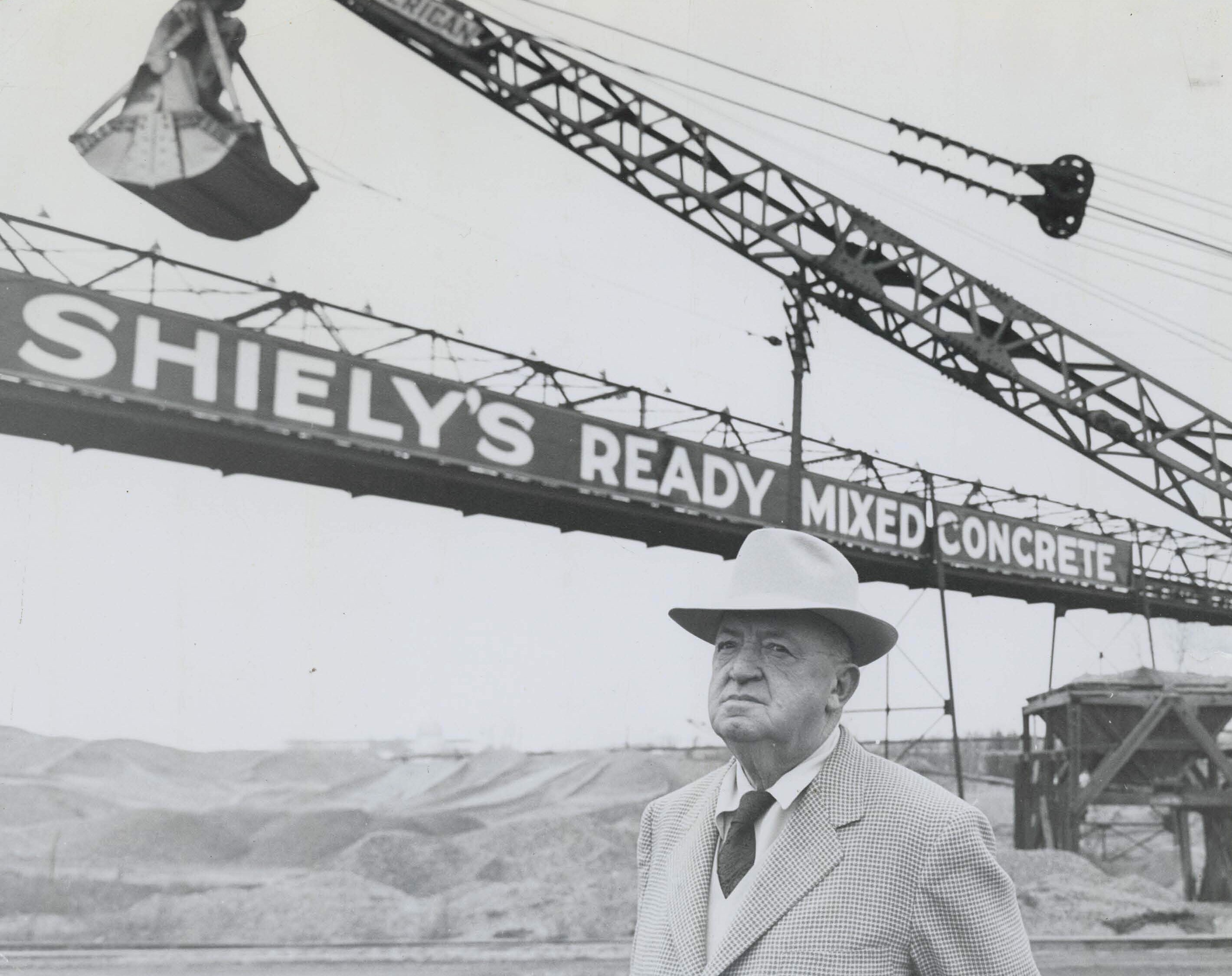
Shiely at Nelson Plant in Lilydale circa 1951

In 1951, the Shiely Company unsuccessfully attempted to lease land in Bloomington, Minnesota for a new quarry along the Mississippi. After being refuted by the Bloomington City Council, Shiely turned to expanding his existing plant in Mendota, Minnesota instead. The town of Mendota refused Shiely a permit to expand the existing Nelson Plant in 1952. Undeterred, Shiely offered the affected landowners in Mendota $5000 each to secede and incorporate as a new town. The vote passed 47-45. The town of Mendota sued to stop the succession but the Minnesota Supreme Court ruled in favor of Shiely and the town of Lilydale was created.

=== Family life ===
In 1867, Shiely married Mary Elizabeth Jenny. They had five children:

1. Joseph Leo Shiely Jr (1914–1995) - Went on to become President of the Shiely Company
2. Mercedes M Shiely - Attended Trinity College and married the head of Murphy Motor Freight
3. James F Shiely (1919 - 1969)- President for Winton Lumber in Minneapolis
4. Vincent R Shiely (1920–1977) - Became CEO of Briggs and Stratton
5. Gertrude R Shiely (1920–1999) - A Psychiatric Social Worker at the University of Minnesota and philanthropist who worked with many charities in St Paul.

== Death ==
Shiely died in his home in St. Paul, Minnesota, on January 15, 1972, at the age of 86.

Shiely's only landmark is a monument to his Irish forefathers in the cemetery at the Church of St. Thomas in Jessenland Township, which was dedicated in 1971.

== Primary sources ==
- Young, Robert O. (1952). America's Builders. Malibu, CA: Pepperdine College Press.
- Smith, Robert T. (December 9, 1951). "Too Small to Fight, Shiely Used Brains, Made Millions". Minneapolis Star Tribune.
- Lethert Wingerd, Mary (2003). Claiming the City: Politics, Faith and the Power of Place in St Paul (1st ed.). Cornell University Press. pp. 34–36. ISBN 9780801488856.
- McClure, Jane (Fall 1994). "The Midway Chamber and Its Community: The Colorful History of an 'Unparalleled Feature'" (PDF). Ramsey County History. Ramsey County Historical Society
- Orr Baker, Robert (1984) "The Minnesota Club: St Paul's Enterprising Leaders and Their 'Gentlemen's Social Club' Ramsey County History. Ramsey County Historical Society
- Towne, Oliver (1972) "Joe's Last Hurrah." St Paul Pioneer Press Jan. 1972
