= Railroad and Bank Building =

Historic building in Saint Paul, Minnesota, U.S.

180 East Fifth
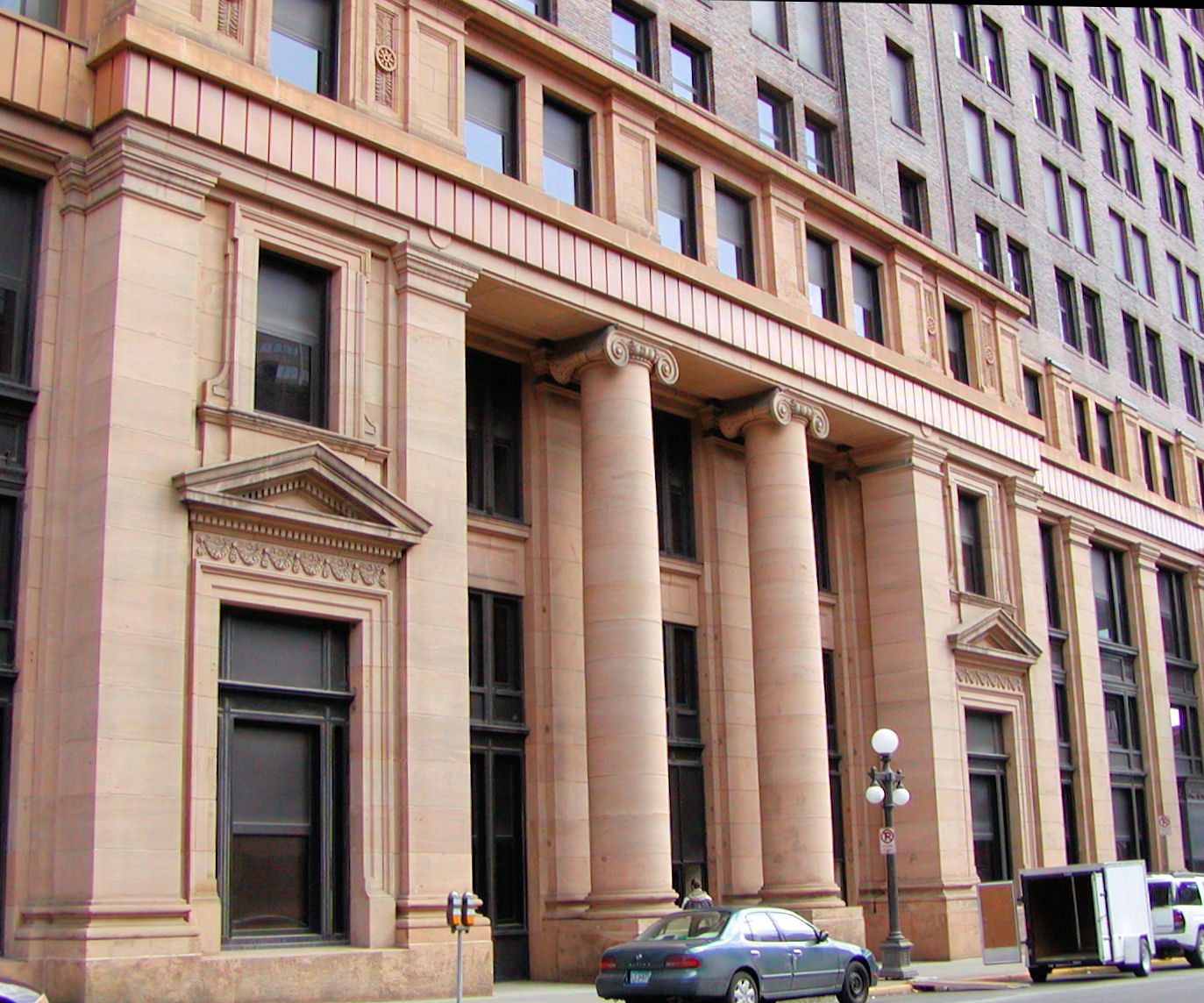
- One of the recessed entrances

General information
- Type: Highrise office
- Location: 180 E Fifth St; Saint Paul, Minnesota, U.S.
- Coordinates: 44.9476°N 93.0891°W
- Completed: 1916

Height
- Height: 198 feet (60 m)

Dimensions
- Other dimensions: 291.9 ft × 233.1 ft (89.0 m × 71.0 m)

Technical details
- Structural system: Steel frame
- Material: Brick
- Floor count: 14
- Floor area: 668,321 sq ft (62,089 m^{2}) (Note: Another source reports 674,504 sq ft (62,663 m^{2}))
- Lifts/elevators: 12

Design and construction
- Architect: Charles Sumner Frost
- Railroad and Bank Building
- U.S. National Register of Historic Places
- U.S. Historic district – Contributing property
- Location within Minnesota Location within the United States
- Area: 1.76 acres (0.71 ha)
- Architectural style: Classical Revival
- Part of: Lowertown Historic District
- NRHP reference No.: 83000935
- Added to NRHP: February 21, 1983

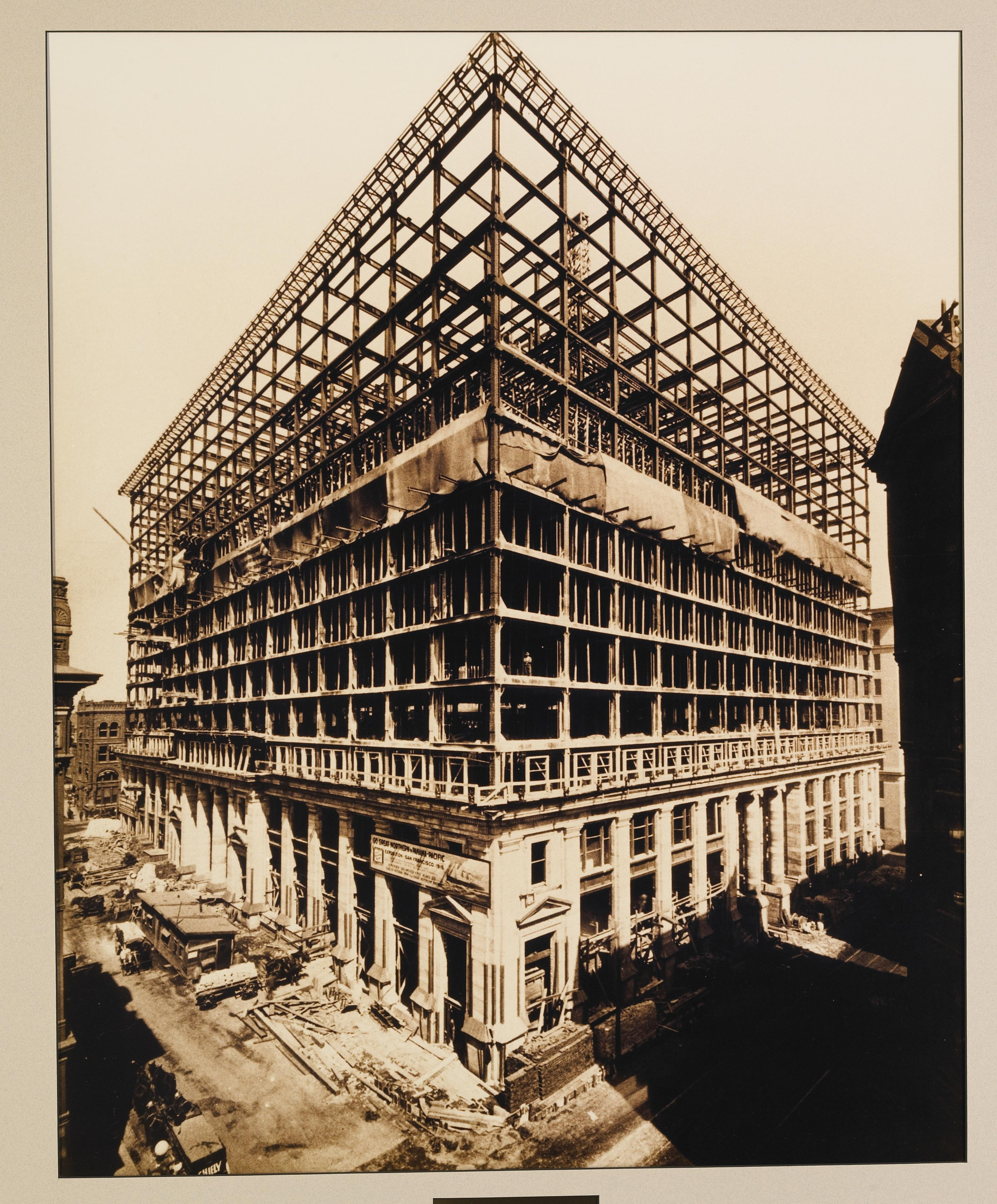
Great Northern building mid-construction circa 1915. Note the Shiely Company horse and buggy in the bottom left.

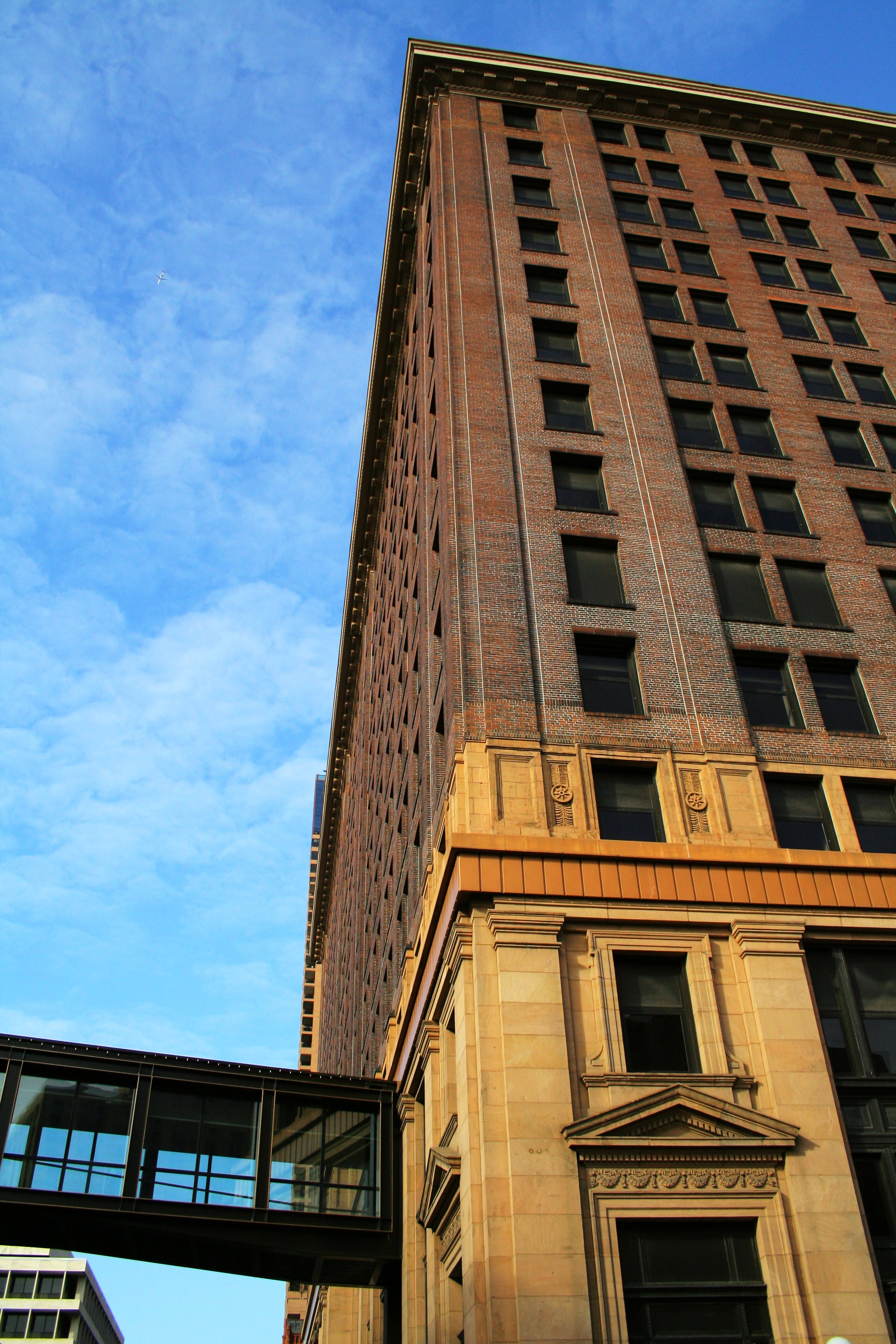
The southwest corner

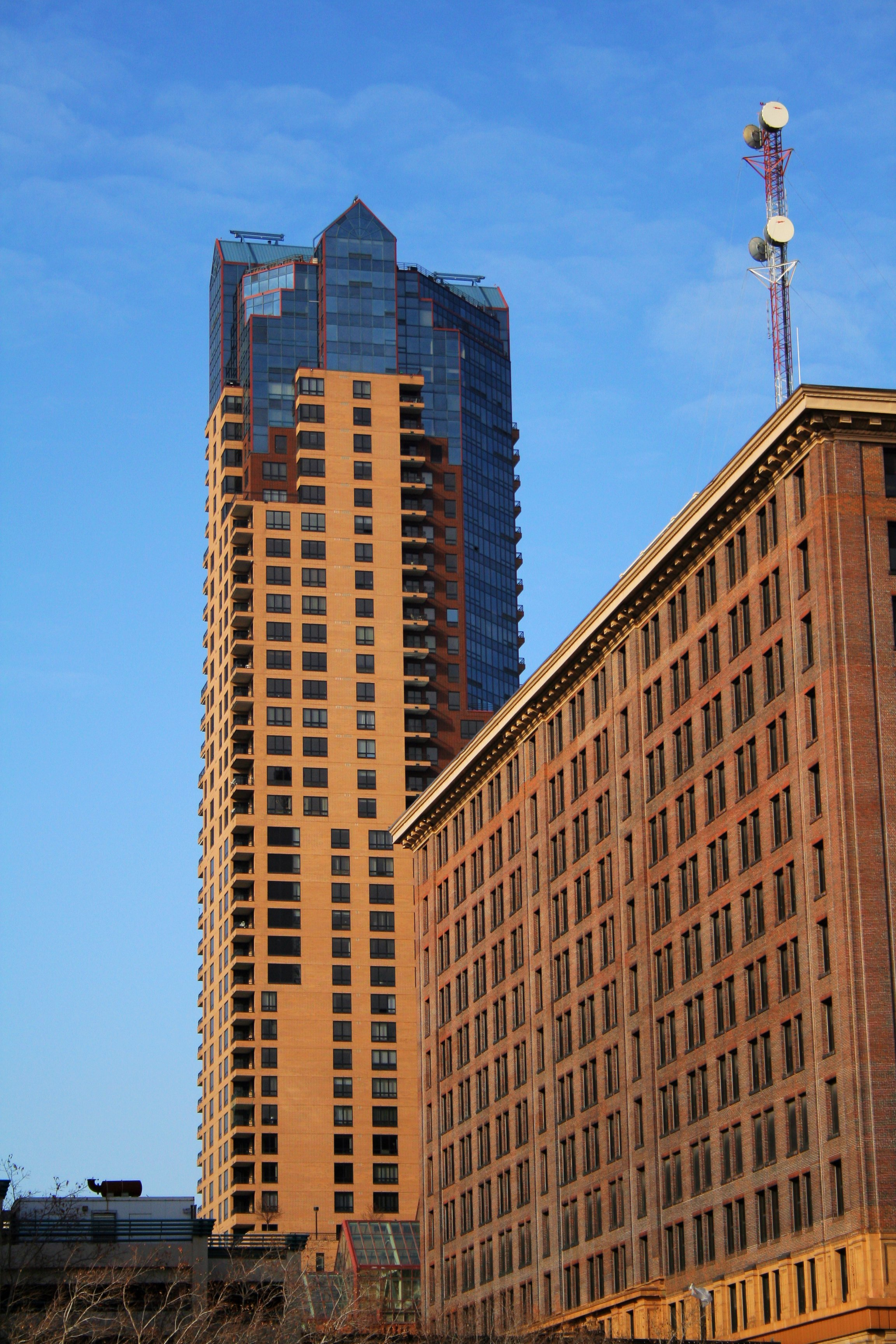
Jackson Street (west) facade

The Railroad and Bank Building, renamed Great Northern Building in 2019, is an office building in Saint Paul, Minnesota, United States. It was the largest office building in the Upper Midwest from its completion in 1914 until 1973. For most of its existence, it was the headquarters of the business empire created by 19th century railroad entrepreneur James J. Hill. The building is the work of architect Charles Sumner Frost and is a contributing property of the St. Paul's Lowertown Historic District. After the decline of the railroads in the United States, the building has been used as leased office space with some retail operations on the lower floors.

== Background ==
Railroad magnate James J. Hill was the majority owner of the Great Northern Railway since he and a group of investors purchased the predecessor company in the late 1870s. Hill took control of the Northern Pacific Railway, a competing line, around 1900. Hill and J. P. Morgan, tried to merge the two railroads in 1895 and again in the early 1900s, into the Northern Securities Company railroad trust. Both attempts were blocked by the Supreme Court after the U.S. Justice Department invoked the Sherman Antitrust Act. Hill took control of the First National Bank and Northwest Trust Company around 1912. (Note: At the time, the First National Bank and the Northwest Trust Company were related by separate companies)

Hill sought to build a new headquarters building for his empire around this time, to replace the c. 1887 Great Northern Building at 300 Wall Street in St. Paul. The building was constructed from 1914 to 1916, at a cost of $4 million, as the corporate headquarters of the three separate companies he controlled. Due to the anti-trust concerns and the need to keep day-to-day operations independent, the building was designed to appear and generally function as a separate structure for each of the three tenants. The three companies individually owned their section of the building; solid walls divided the building into sections, each with a private entrance and set of elevators – Great Northern on 4th Street, Northern Pacific on 5th Street, and the First National Bank and Northwest Trust on Jackson Street. When constructed, a single door separated the presidential offices of the two railroads on the tenth floor. In light of anti-trust concerns, this was the only connection within the building and the door was normally locked with the keys tightly controlled. Routine communication was either by telephone or by sending written documents through a six-mile (10 km) network of pneumatic tubes that allowed items to reach any place in the building within ten seconds.

A building construction committee was formed with a representative from each company, the Northern Pacific chief engineer William L. Darling, the Great Northern's assistant to the president Ralph Budd, and First National Bank's president Everett H. Baily. Charles Sumner Frost, who was also responsible for two other significant downtown buildings, Saint Paul Union Depot and The Chicago, St. Paul, Minneapolis and Omaha Office Building, was chosen to be the project architect. It was built on the site of the Davidson Block (1880), the Economy Hotel, and several other small buildings.

== Architecture ==
The Classical Revival building has a steel frame with reinforced concrete floors and a masonry exterior. The first three stories are of sandstone, the fourth of terra cotta and the remaining of brick. The building is topped with a classical cornice. The north, west, and south facades are almost identical but due the slope of the lot, the east side shows an additional floor. The entrances are recessed in antis with Ionic columns made from sandstone; similar pilasters are used around the building on the first three floors.

The foundation was constructed to be able to support an additional four floors. The building was reported to contain 934,000 sq ft (86,800 m^{2}). It has a steel frame and concrete floor slabs. Finish materials include brick, marble, and terra cotta. Construction started in February 1914 with the demolition of the existing buildings on the site, and was completed by December 1, 1915. The project engineer was Toltz Engineering Co. and the builder was Grant Smith, both of St. Paul. Materials for the building were provided by Joe Shiely Sr as seen in the photo.

The building included a 1,600 sq ft (150 m^{2}) bungalow-style cottage on the roof that included a room for board meetings and two bedrooms where out-of-town board members could stay. The bank had a retail banking operation on the first floor in the center of the building in an atrium with a height of 53 ft (16 m). The open area above the central interior courtyard provided daylight and ventilation to the inside offices on the higher floors.

The utilities (heat, electricity, and water) were common and the three companies bickered over their share of the cost until the 1970 merger of the two railroads with the Chicago, Burlington and Quincy Railroad to form the Burlington Northern. As the railroads had bought the bank's portion of the building in 1966, the building finally had one owner. The bank had moved to the 32-story First National Bank Building in 1931 after merging with Merchants National Bank in 1929. The Burlington Northern maintained its headquarters in the building until 1981, when the company's corporate offices relocated to Seattle.

== Later history ==
The 232-by-290-foot (71 m × 88 m) building was the largest office building in the Upper Midwest until the 1973 completion of the 51-story IDS Center in Minneapolis. A deteriorating band of decorative terra cotta near the top was removed in the mid-1970s and the original cast iron window frames were replaced with more energy efficient windows by the early 1980s.

The Palmer Group, a local developer, bought the building from the Burlington Northern in December, 1984 and initiated a $9.7 million renovation of 65,000 sq ft (6,000 m^{2}) on the first two floors, converting them into retail space. Restaurant tenants included Burger King and other fast food outlets, a departure from the other kinds of restaurants found in the area. The railroad's former cafeteria, an 80 by 80 ft (24 by 24 m) space in the center of the building, was turned back into an atrium with the original 53 ft (16 m) high skylit roof restored.

As of 2011, the building had a 55-person conference center and a 267-seat theater that tenants could use for meetings such as lectures, training sessions, community meetings, and other events. A bigger meeting space, the two-story Great Hall banquet center, seats 500 people. The first two floors were remodeled and the owner planned to continue renovating the building, including the addition of a tenant fitness center.

The building was purchased in receivership in 2019 for $52 million by New York City-based Gamma Real Estate, which has spent $2.5 million on remodeling, including $1 million on the Great Hall. The Great Hall, once hosting private events such as weddings, was made into an amenity for building workers. The building was rebranded as the Great Northern Building at this time.

As of 2021, the building has the most rentable office space in downtown St. Paul. It is connected by skyway to four different surrounding structures. Most floors have 50,000 to 55,000 sq ft (4,600 to 5,100 m^{2}) of rentable space.

== Names ==
The building has had many different names: (in chronological order)

- Railroad and Bank Building
- Great Northern Railroad Building
- Burlington Northern Building
- First Trust Center
- US Bank & Trust Building
- US Bank Trust Center
- 180 East Fifth
- Great Northern Building (since 2019)

== Incidents ==
On February 18, 1972, bombs were detonated in several locations around St. Paul, including the State Office Building. The heaviest damage was from a bomb left in a rear service door of the building that damaged a freight elevator and injured two people. Police and FBI investigators believed the bombings were intended to distract police from an attempted bank robbery that occurred shortly after the bombings.

== Tenants ==
Gander Outdoors had its headquarters in the building, on at least one-and-a-half floors from at least 2011 until its 2017 bankruptcy. Part of the 11th floor was once remodeled for ditech Mortgage, but the company did not occupy the space due to financial difficulties. Another big tenant, Cray Computer, also vacated when leaving St. Paul. In 2015, Ditech, rebranded as Greentree, leased 140,000 sq ft (13,000 m^{2}) in the building for 800 workers on parts of four different floors. The company planned to spend $7 million to upgrade the space and move its employees from two other locations in the city. This lease left the building 97% occupied.

Seven hundred employees of the Minnesota Department of Employment and Economic Development moved into the 11 thru 13th floors in August 2021. A large workforce of the U.S. Army Corps of Engineers, also using 1 1/2 to 2 floors since at least 2011, is scheduled to move out of the building by the end of 2022. HealthPartners was a large tenant in 2011 with a call center and billing operations in the building. It moved its first 400 workers to the building in 1997. The original tenant, Burlington Northern, was down to one floor at that time.
