= List of cemeteries in Minnesota =

This list of cemeteries in Minnesota includes currently operating, historical (closed for new interments), and defunct (graves abandoned or removed) cemeteries, columbaria, and mausolea which are historical and/or notable. It does not include pet cemeteries.

== Clay County ==
- Prairie Home Cemetery in Moorhead

== Clearwater County ==
- Cemetery sites at Itasca State Park near Park Rapids; IUCN-listed

== Dakota County ==
- Acacia Park Cemetery in Mendota Heights

== Fort Snelling (unorganized territory) ==
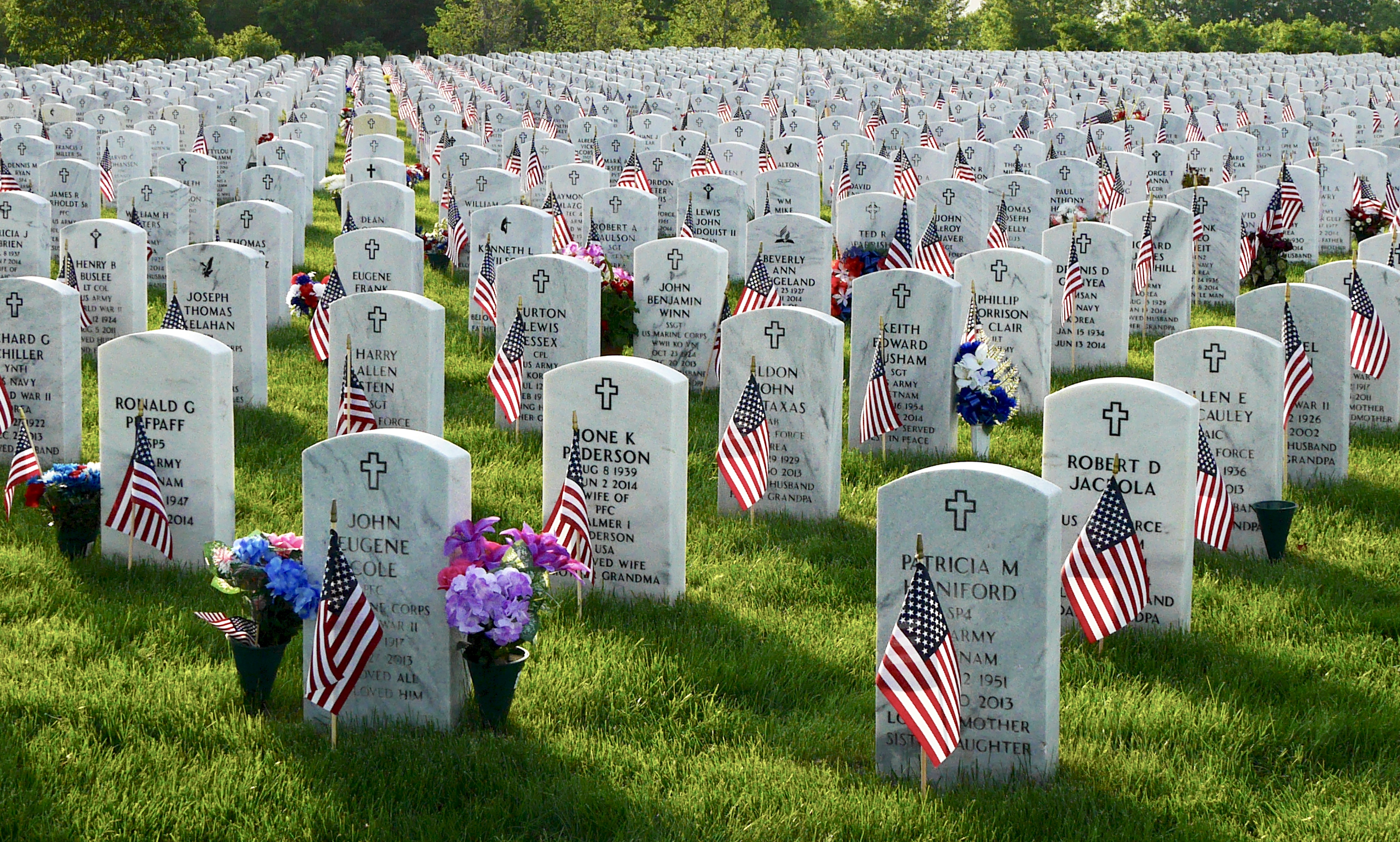
Fort Snelling National Cemetery

- Fort Snelling National Cemetery

== Hennepin County ==
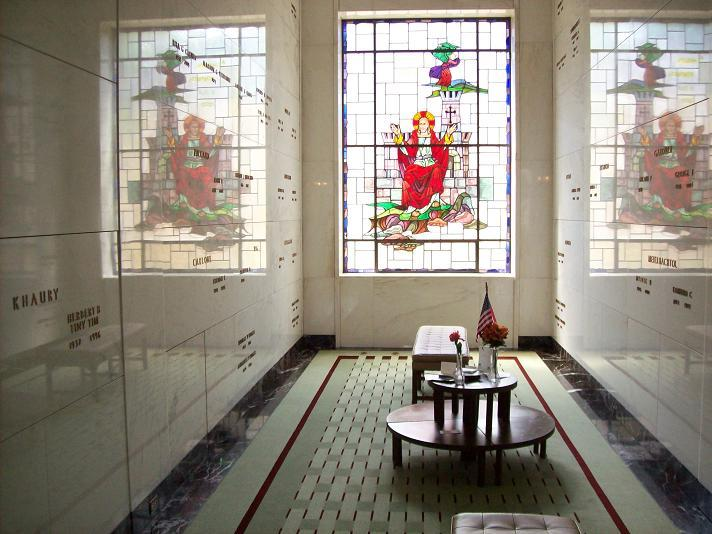
Mausoleum at Lakewood Cemetery in Minneapolis, Hennepin County

- Bloomington Cemetery in Bloomington; NRHP-listed
- Lakewood Cemetery in Minneapolis; NRHP-listed
- Minneapolis Pioneers and Soldiers Memorial Cemetery in Minneapolis; NRHP-listed

== Meeker County ==
- Steelesville Cemetery near Dassel

== Ramsey County ==
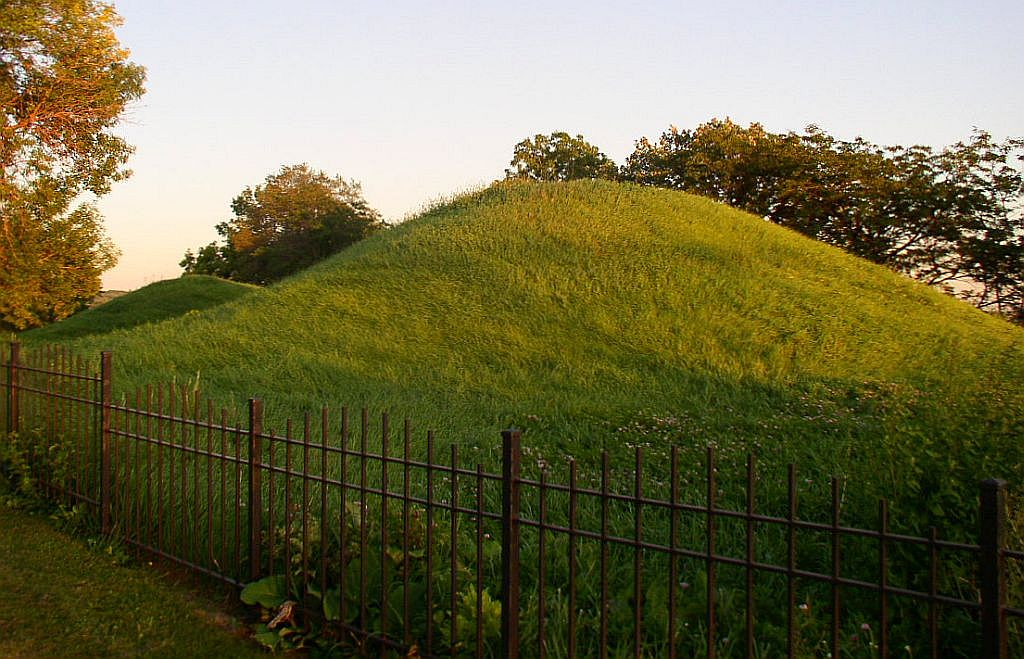
Indian Mounds Park in Saint Paul, Ramsey County

- Indian Mounds Park in Saint Paul

== Sibley County ==
- Cemetery at Church of St. Thomas in Jessenland Township; NRHP-listed

== See also ==
- Private Cemeteries Act (Minnesota)
- List of cemeteries in the United States
