= Private Cemeteries Act (Minnesota) =

The Private Cemeteries Act is a state Act, which provides legislation respecting private cemeteries, human remains and burial sites in the state of Minnesota, United States.

== About ==
The Act is divided into fourteen sections, including:

- Plat and Record
- Effect of Recorded Plat
- Religious Corporations may Acquire Existing Cemeteries
- Conveyance of Lots
- Gifts for Proprietary Care of Lots
- Transfer to Association; How Effected
- Effect of Transfer
- Damages; Illegal Molestation of Human Remains; Burials; Cemeteries; Penalty; Authentication
- Civil Actions
- Exemptions
- Vacation; Change of Name
- Abandoned Lots; Recovery
- Correction of Interment Errors
- Relocation

== Passage and Revisions ==
The Act was first brought into force in 1976 and has undergone fifteen revisions since that time.

- 1976 Revision
- 1980 Revision
- 1983 Revision
- 1984 Revision
- 1985 Revision
- 1986 Revision
- 1989 Revision
- 1993 Revision
- 1994 Revision
- 1999 Revision
- 2003 Revision
- 2005 Revision
- 2007 Revision
- 2010 Revision
- 2013 Revision

== Effects ==
The Passage of the Private Cemeteries Act impacted the practice of archaeology and treatment of human remains in Minnesota in several ways. The Act:

- legislates the creation, recording, and transfer of private cemeteries, as well as the sale of burial plots within them;
- mandates state fiduciary responsibility for burial authentications;
- requires that data regarding burial locations be made publicly available through state agencies such as Minnesota Geospatial Information Office, and the Unplatted Burial Sites and Earthworks in Minnesota website, and assigns state fiduciary responsibility over associated costs;
- establishes the roles and responsibilities of the Minnesota Office of the State Archaeologist (MOSA), with respect to human remains, burial sites and cemeteries; and assigns the office prerogative over the licensure and process requirements for burial authentications;
- provides a legislates requirement proponents who plan to develop with known human remains or burials within their proposed development area., to submit their plans to the State Archaeologist at the MOSA for review; and
- enacts penalties for violations and non-compliance

== Archaeological protection ==
The Act affords protection to state archaeological sites under Section MS 307.08, in that the state of Minnesota declares:

"that all human burials, human remains, and human burial grounds shall be accorded equal treatment and respect for human dignity without reference to their ethnic origins, cultural backgrounds, or religious affiliations. The provisions of this section shall apply to all human burials, human remains, or human burial grounds found on or in all public or private lands or waters in Minnesota"

== Compliance and enforcement ==
Penalties for contraventions against the Act are detailed in Section 307.08 of the Act, and include:

=== Felony; gross misdemeanor ===
A person who intentionally, willfully, and knowingly does any of the following …:

- destroys, mutilates, or injures human burials or human burial grounds;
- without the consent of the appropriate authority, disturbs human burial grounds or removes human remains.

=== Gross misdemeanor ===
A person who, without the consent of the appropriate authority and the landowner, intentionally, willfully, and knowingly does any of the following:

- removes any tombstone, monument, or structure placed in any public or private cemetery or authenticated human burial ground;
- removes any fence, railing, or other work erected for protection or ornament, or any tree, shrub, or plant or grave goods and artifacts within the limits of a public or private cemetery or authenticated human burial ground; or
- discharges any firearms upon or over the grounds of any public or private cemetery or authenticated burial ground.

== Minnesota Office of the State Archaeologist ==
The Minnesota Office of the State Archaeologist (MOSA) oversees a portion of the Act and has the following duties stemming from the legislation:

- Authenticates all unrecorded burial sites over 50 years old;
- Grants permission for disturbances in unrecorded non-Indian cemeteries;
- Allows posting and approves signs for authenticated non-Indian cemeteries;
- Maintains unrecorded cemetery and burial site locations and data;
- Provides burial sites data to the Minnesota Geospatial Information Office (MnGEO) -- formerly the Land Management Information Center (LMIC);
- Determines the ethnic identity of burials over 50 years old;
- Helps determine tribal affiliation of Indian burials;
- Determines if osteological analysis should be done on recovered remains;
- Helps establish provisions for dealing with unaffiliated Indian remains;
- Reviews development plans that may impact unrecorded burials;
- answering public and agency inquiries about known or suspected burial sites;
- coordinating with the Minnesota Indian Affairs Council (MIAC) when Indian burials are threatened;
- formally determining the presence or absence of burial grounds through field work in particular areas (authentication);
- advising agencies and landowners on legal and management requirements for unrecorded burial grounds.

The MOSA has adopted an internal policy, called the State Archaeologists Procedures for Implementing Minnesota's Private Cemeteries Act, which helps guide the implementation and execution of the Act, within MOSA operations.

This procedural manual provides detailed sections on:

- Authentication;
- Burial Removal and Analysis;
- Reinterment;
- Management of Unrecorded Burial Grounds;
- Record Keeping and Data Sharing; and
- Development Plan Review

== Archaeological licensing ==
The Minnesota Office of the State Archaeologist has mandate over the issuance of archaeological investigation licenses in the state, in conjunction with the Minnesota Historical Society. There are four kinds of licenses, including:

- Yearly license for reconnaissance/Phase I survey.
- Site-specific license for site evaluations/Phase II.
- Site-specific license for major excavations/Phase III.
- Site-specific license for burial authentications

Burial authentication licenses governed by Section MS 307.08 of the Private Cemeteries Act, are issued by the MOSA. These authentications determine the absence or presence of human remains at a site, and often involve extensive sampling of a specific locality. As the State Archaeologist is the only one legislated by the Field Archaeology Act (Minnesota) to authenticate burials older than 50 years old, the State Archaeologist often serves as Co-Principal on these permits. In addition to the five basic professional standards of the MOSA outlined here, the following additional requirements are necessary for burial authentication licenses:

- "Demonstrated experience or training in dealing with human remains, identifying fragmentary human remains, and with assessing soil conditions and features commonly associated with human burials"; and
- "If a suspected Indian burial is involved… some experience in consulting with tribal groups and the Minnesota Indian Affairs Council"

== Coroner; Medical Examiner Act ==
One additional Act which governs the archaeological methods associated with human remains in Minnesota, is the Coroner; Medical Examiner Act, enacted in 1965. This acts makes provisions for the discovery of unidentified deceased persons, and outlines the chain of command with respect to these remains. Section 390.25, Subdivision 5, "Notice to State Archaeologist" reads:

"After the coroner or medical examiner has completed the investigation, the coroner or medical examiner shall notify the state archaeologist, according to section 307.08, of all unidentified human remains found outside of platted, recorded, or identified cemeteries and in contexts which indicate antiquity of greater than 50 years".

== See also ==
- List of cemeteries in Minnesota
