= Arthur T. Gibbons =

American businessman & politician (1903-1986)

Arthur Thomas Gibbons Sr. (February 2, 1903 – April 19, 1986) was an American businessman and politician.

Gibbons was born in Oelwein, Iowa and he moved with his family to Saint Paul, Ramsey County, Minnesota in 1903. Gibbons graduated from the Mechanic Arts High School in Saint Paul, Minnesota and went to the University of Minnesota. He lived in Saint Paul, Minnesota with his wife and family and was involved with the insurance business. Gibbons served in the Minnesota House of Representatives from 1935 to 1954 and then served in The Ramsey County Commission from 1962 to 1970. He died from lung cancer at his home in Saint Paul, Minnesota. His funeral and burial was in Saint Paul, Minnesota.
