= Field Archaeology Act (Minnesota) =

The Field Archaeology Act is a state Act legislating the preservation, interpretation and protection of archaeology in the state of Minnesota, United States of America. The Act is divided into twelve sections.

== Passage and revisions ==
The Act was first brought into force in 1963 and has undergone ten revisions since that time.

== Effects ==
The passage of the Field Archaeology Act in 1963 impacted the practice of archaeology in Minnesota in several critical ways. It provided proscriptions related to the practice of archaeology, banned unlicensed practitioners from conducting archaeological investigations on state sites, and enacted penalties for violations of the Act. It also officially established the Minnesota Office of the State Archaeologist, and outlined the licensing process and requirements for archaeologists seeking to work on state sites. In terms of physical archaeological remains and data recovered as a result of field archaeology, the Act explicitly granted ownership and title to the state.

== Archaeological protection ==
The Act affords protection to state archaeological sites under Section 138.32, in that the state "reserves to itself the exclusive right and privilege of field archaeology on state sites, in order to protect and preserve archaeological and scientific information, matter, and objects".

== Minnesota Office of the State Archaeologist ==
The Act defines the position of the State Archaeologist, and dictates the lawful duties thereof. The Minnesota Office of the State Archaeologist is charged with the following duties:

- Acts as the agent of the state to enforce the Act.
- Sponsors, engages in, and directs fundamental archaeological research.
- Cooperates with agencies to preserve and interpret archaeological sites.
- Encourages protection of archaeological sites on private property.
- Retrieves and protects artifacts and data discovered on public property.
- Retrieves and protects archaeological remains disturbed by agency construction.
- Helps preserve artifacts and data recovered by archaeological work.
- Disseminates archaeological information through report publication.
- Approves archaeologist's qualifications for licensing to work on public property.
- Formulates licensing provisions for archaeological work on public property.
- Issues emergency licenses for archaeological work on public property.
- Revokes or suspends archaeological licenses due to good cause
- Approves curation arrangements of artifacts and data from state sites.
- Repossesses artifacts from state sites that are not being properly curated.
- Consults with the Minnesota Historical Society and Minnesota Indian Affairs Council regarding significant field archaeology.
- Completes annual reports about the Office of the State Archaeologist's and licensees' activities.
- Reviews and comments on agency development plans that may affect state sites

== Archaeological licensing ==
The Act provides that any archaeological work conducted on non-federal public land in Minnesota, requires a permit issued by the Office of the State Archaeologist. There are four kinds of licenses, including

- Yearly license for reconnaissance/Phase I survey.
- Site-specific license for site evaluations/Phase II.
- Site-specific license for major excavations/Phase III.
- Site-specific license for burial authentications

The State archaeologist provides a review and vetting of an archaeologist's qualifications, and forwards the application onto the Minnesota Historical Society for license issuance.

- License Qualifications
- License Application Forms and Information

== Burial grounds ==
Burial grounds and cemeteries in Minnesota are governed by the Private Cemeteries Act. The Act was first enacted in 1976, and has been amended eight times, most recently in 2007. The State Archaeologist oversees the implementation of this Act and has the following associated duties:

- Authenticates all unrecorded burial sites over 50 years old
- Grants permission for disturbances in unrecorded non-Indian cemeteries.
- Allows posting and approves signs for authenticated non-Indian cemeteries.
- Maintains unrecorded cemetery data.
- Provides burial sites data to the Minnesota Geospatial Information Office (MnGEO) -- formerly the Land Management Information Center (LMIC).
- Determines the ethnic identity of burials over 50 years old.
- Helps determine tribal affiliation of Indian burials.
- Determines if osteological analysis should be done on recovered remains.
- Helps establish provisions for dealing with unaffiliated Indian remains.
- Reviews development plans that may impact unrecorded burials.

Complete statute language

== See also ==
National Register of Historic Places listings in Minnesota
