= Lowertown Historic District (Saint Paul, Minnesota) =

Historic district in Saint Paul, Minnesota, U.S.

- U.S. National Register of Historic Places
- U.S. Historic district
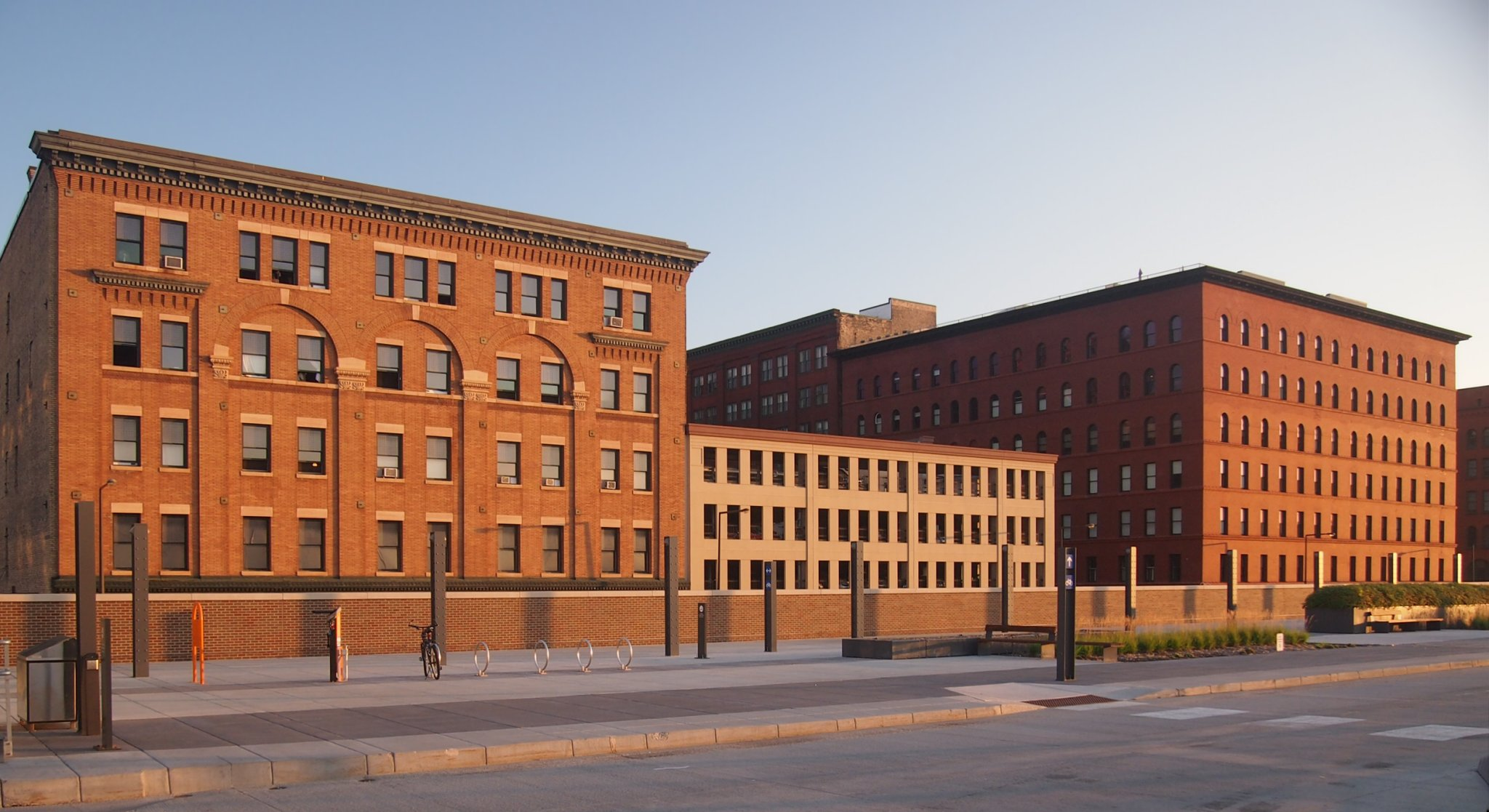
- Commercial buildings of the Lowertown Historic District
- Interactive map showing the location of the Lowertown Historic District
- Location: Roughly bounded by Kellogg Blvd, Broadway, 7th, and Jackson Sts., Saint Paul, Minnesota, U.S.
- Coordinates: 44°56′57″N 93°5′13″W
- Area: 35.5 acres (14.4 ha)
- Built: 1870–1921
- Architect: Multiple
- Architectural style: Late 19th and 20th Century Revivals, Late Victorian
- NRHP reference No.: 83000935
- Added to NRHP: February 21, 1983

The Lowertown Historic District is a historic district in the Lowertown neighborhood of Saint Paul, Minnesota, United States. This 16-block warehouse and wholesaling district comprises 37 contributing properties built between the 1870s and 1920. It was listed on the National Register of Historic Places in 1983 for the significance of its river and rail connections, economic impact, architecture, and urban planning. Lowertown was originally the lower landing on the Mississippi River; the first port of access to the Twin Cities. Several warehouse, railroad, banking, and distribution buildings served the entire Upper Midwest from 1880 to 1920. A significant concentration of these buildings survive, unified by similar architectural styles and construction materials. Many were designed by the city's most prestigious architects, including Cass Gilbert and Clarence H. Johnston Sr.

== History ==
The Lowertown neighborhood declined after the Depression. The renovation of the Merchants National Bank Building (now the McColl Building) in the late 1960s was the first project to focus attention on revitalization potential. The conversion of the Noyes Brothers and Cutler Building into a complex of offices, shops, and restaurants (now known as Park Square Court) soon followed. The city's Housing and Redevelopment Authority (HRA) became involved in 1973 when Mears Park was redesigned by William Sanders and renamed after Norman B. Mears, a Saint Paul businessman.

In April 1978, the Lowertown Redevelopment Corporation (LRC) was organized with the goal of creating "a place for people, a highly livable urban village in the midst of the city, which will bring new jobs, housing, commercial development, and year-round activities to Lowertown and infuse the city with renewed vitality." Enabled by an unprecedented $10 million grant by the McKnight Foundation, the LRC assumed the role and responsibility of driving the revitalization of Lowertown. Throughout the 1970s and 1980s, artists moved to Lowertown, attracted by low rents, raw space and relative quiet. This new population began to bring life to the buildings and the streets of Lowertown. Initiated by the LRC and supported fully by the City of St. Paul, Lowertown was listed on the National Register of Historic Places in 1983; the next year, the City of St. Paul designated the Lowertown Historic District as a Heritage Preservation Site.

== Redevelopment ==
Aided by these designations and the associated tax credits, Artspace, the LRC, the city, and others partnered to renovate three buildings dedicated to the arts. The Lowertown Artists Lofts Cooperative, the Tilsner and the Northern Warehouse were renovated and became the anchors of the arts community. Throughout the years, there has been a steady commitment to incrementally reinvest in the assets of Lowertown. Instead of demolishing and building new, Lowertown remained committed to a slow, deliberate and steady approach to redevelopment. This approach allowed Lowertown to remain a relatively quiet neighborhood on the edge of downtown. Such an approach was particularly supportive of the artist community, as it respected the financial and environmental needs of working artists. In 1982, the St. Paul Farmers’ Market moved to Lowertown. An institution since the late 1800s, the Farmers’ Market was an anomaly of sorts for Lowertown - it was a destination in the middle of a relatively quiet neighborhood. The market now draws 20,000 people each weekend in the summer. In 2006 the LRC transformed into the Lowertown Future Fund to continue supporting Lowertown redevelopment.

New residences have been built in the neighborhood, attracting new residents paying market rate for condominiums. Restaurants, festivals, weddings and other regional attractions, such as the restored Union Depot, have opened in Lowertown. The St. Paul Art Crawl is held twice a year and exemplifies the cultural atmosphere that local residents have worked so hard to maintain. In 2013, USA Today named Lowertown one of "10 up-and-coming neighborhoods around the USA" after it was announced RealtyTrac named Lowertown at the top of its "hipster zip codes" list. The "hipster" designation implies the neighborhood's high proportion of "people between 25 and 34 years old who use public transportation and rent their housing."

In 2015, the St. Paul Saints professional baseball team opened its season in the new CHS Field. The stadium stands in the space of the former Gilette/Diamond Products plant at 5th Street and Broadway. Designs for the stadium were presented to the public in December 2013. Art installations from local artists adorn the exterior of the ballpark. CHS Field sits outside the official 18 blocks that make up the Lowertown Heritage Preservation District, roughly bounded by Kellogg Boulevard, Broadway, 7th Street and Jackson Street.

== Mears Park ==
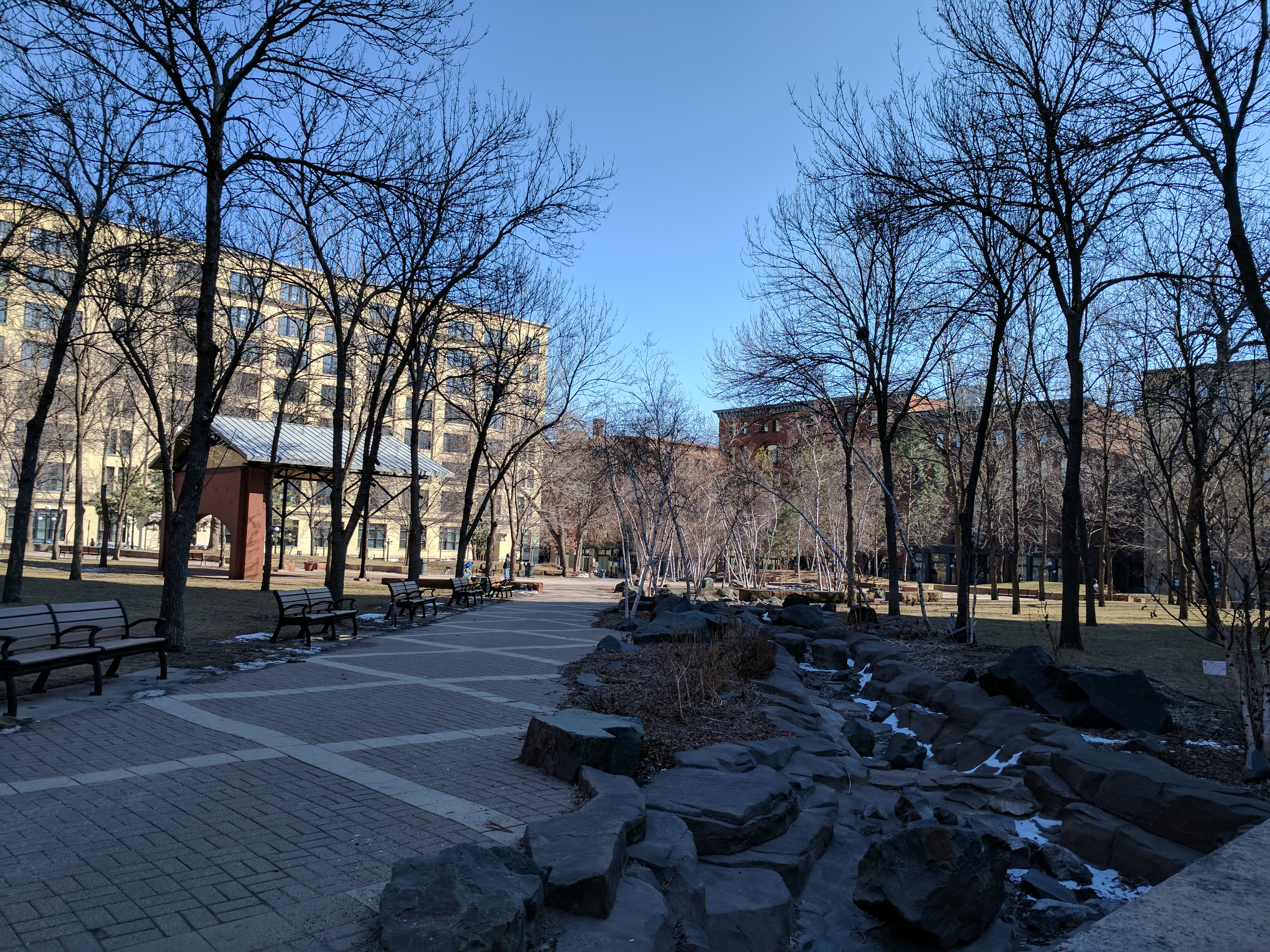
Image of Mears Park, 2017

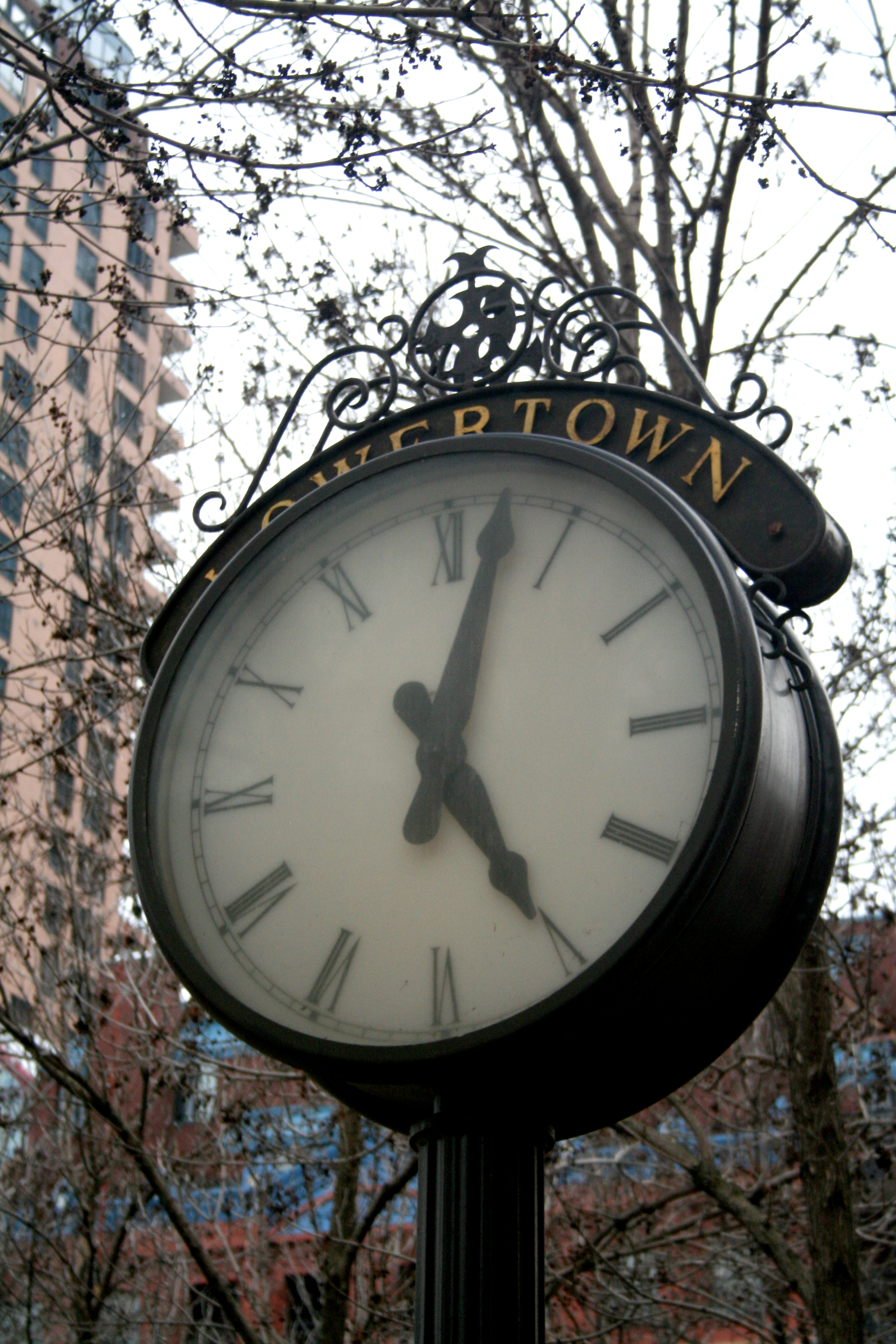
Mears Park, Lowertown St Paul Clock

Previously known as Smith Park, Park Square, and Baptist Hill, Mears Park is bounded by 5th, 6th, Sibley and Wacouta streets. The site was originally the home of the First Baptist congregation, who built their church on top of a hill in the middle of a city block. In 1849 the land was donated to the city by a man named Robert Smith after the church expanded to a new location a few blocks north. The hill was leveled and the square was formally created in 1888.

For most of the next century, the park was a traditional city square with a central fountain and sidewalks radiating about it. In the early 1970s, the park became known as the “Brickyard” after a renovation covered much of the square in bricks. After his death in 1974, the park was officially renamed after Norman Mears, a St. Paul inventor in the printing and etching field; his inventions were used to fight World War II and make color televisions. After retirement, Mears had set his sights on the revitalization of Lowertown.

Modern-day Mears Park was opened in 1992 following a major reconstruction designed by landscape architect Don Ganje and artist Brad Goldberg. The new design received rave reviews for brilliantly mixing natural and manmade elements, from the rocky stream to the metal bandshell, and has proven popular year after year. Today the park sits in the middle of a re-energized Lowertown, hosting handfuls of fairs and festivals throughout the season including Music in Mears, the Twin Cities Jazz Festival, and Concrete and Grass Music Festival. Volunteers known as the Friends of Mears Park maintain the gardens.

== Crane Ordway Building ==
Crane and Ordway manufactured valves, fittings, and supplies for steam engines. Rogers and Ordway was the successor company to Wilson & Rogers, the oldest firm in the line of plumbing and steam fittings in the Northwest. At one time, The Crane Company was the largest manufacturer of valves, fittings, and steam supplies in the world, employing over 3,000 men at the factory in Chicago factory. In 1892 Crane bought out the Rugg-Fuller Company in Minneapolis.

On January 1, 1893, Richard T. Crane of Chicago and Lucius Pond Ordway of Saint Paul incorporated the Crane & Ordway Company. It consolidated the firms of Rogers and Ordway of Saint Paul and Duluth with a branch of the Crane Company in Minneapolis, uniting all the large interests in this line of business in the Northwest. Lucius Ordway became vice president and general manager of Crane & Ordway. Ordway came to Saint Paul from Providence, Rhode Island, in 1883 and worked for Wilson & Kogers until 1886, when he became a member of the firm of Rogers & Ordway.

The company dealt in a general line of pipe, fittings, boilers, pumps, pumping machinery, and plumbers' and steam-fitters' supplies. It did an extensive business in well-drilling machinery, windmills, and large irrigating plant outfits of all descriptions, furnishing estimates and designs and complete plans for water works. Crane later became part of American Standard. Ordway went on to help build the 3M company.

The Renaissance Box Building: The building, completed in 1904, was designed by Reed and Stem, the architectural firm that designed Grand Central Terminal in New York and the St. Paul Hotel in downtown St. Paul. It had been vacant for 30 years prior to Aeon, a non-profit developer of affordable housing, restoring it in 2006. The historic warehouse now offers 70 units of affordable rental apartments.

== Union Depot Train Station ==
Saint Paul's Union Depot is a historic railroad station and intermodal transit hub in the Lowertown neighborhood of the city of Saint Paul, Minnesota, United States. It serves light rail, intercity rail, intercity bus, and local bus services.

== Railroad and Bank Building ==
The Railroad and Bank Building building at 176 E. 5th Street, now known as the Great Northern Building, was constructed from 1914 to 1916 at a cost of $4 million as the corporate headquarters of three separate companies controlled by James J. Hill, the Great Northern Railway, the Northern Pacific Railway, the First National Bank and Northwest Trust Company. It replaced 280 Kellogg Blvd, now known as Great Northern Lofts as the headquarters of the railroads. It was designed by Charles Sumner Frost.

== Neighborhood architects ==
Architects who contributed to the neighborhood include Cass Gilbert, J. Walter Stevens, and Charles Sumner Frost.
