= Ray Jerome Baker =

American photographer, film maker and lecturer (1880–1972)

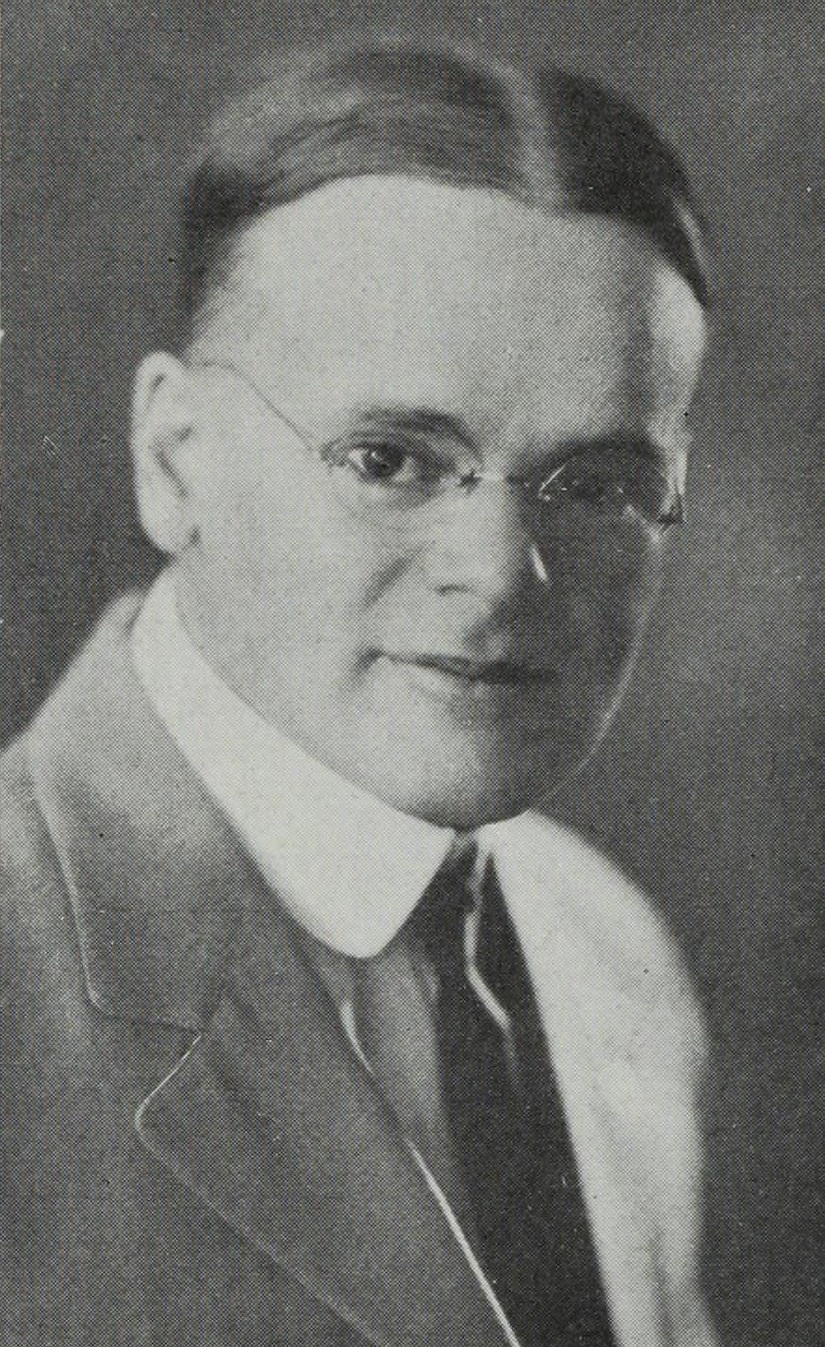
- Baker in 1922. Photo by Emma Freeman
- Born: December 1, 1880; Rockford, Illinois, US
- Died: October 27, 1972 (aged 91); Honolulu, Hawaii, US
- Occupations: Photographer, film maker and lecturer
- Known for: Photography
- Spouse: Edith Frost Baker

Ray Jerome Baker (December 1, 1880 – October, 1972) was an American photographer, film maker and lecturer. His photographs are among some of the earliest professional works in Humboldt County, California, United States, and later in Hawaii where his work focused on the people of that state.

== Biography ==
Baker was born near Rockford, Illinois, in 1880. From 1898 until 1903, he lived in Saint Paul, Minnesota, where he studied at Mechanic Arts High School and took his first photographs before attending the University of Minnesota for one semester. In 1903, he moved to Portland, Oregon, and shortly thereafter, in 1904, to Eureka, California. On his arrival in Eureka, his studio was in a tent until moving into a building at 5th and F Streets, where he ran a commercial photography studio and became a lifelong friend of the writer Jack London. Baker regularly toured southern Humboldt County on a motorcycle in the early 20th century.

He met Edith Frost, a local school teacher, at a Socialist meeting in Eureka in 1906; they married shortly thereafter. Edith Frost Baker's family had holdings around Briceland and Miranda in southern Humboldt; the Bakers would visit them for the rest of their lives. Baker's photos of southern Humboldt are some of the few images of the early 20th century.

During his years living in Humboldt County, Baker built "the Log House" on property that belonged to his mother-in-law who willed it to Baker's only son, Earl Frost Baker. By 1908 he moved his photography business to a new studio at 825 E Street in Eureka and he took his family to Hawaii for the first time.

In August, after his return to Eureka, the Eureka Herald mentioned his name several times in connection with a charge of "taking obscene photographs"; he posted $100 bail and ended up paying a $50 fine. In 1910 Baker moved to Honolulu with his wife and son. His studio and darkroom was located at 911 Kalakaua Avenue from 1915 until he retired in 1960.

Baker remained active as a photographer and travel lecturer until 1959. He produced thousands of photographic images as black-and-white prints, postcards and books, and as glass plates. When lecturing, Baker used hand-painted lantern slides to dramatize his presentations; he made larger hand-colored glass plates backlit with daylight when exhibited. The glass plate lantern slides and many of the photographs taken by Baker were hand-colored by his wife Edith.

Baker traveled to New Zealand and to the U.S. mainland, where he visited Mark Twain and Thomas Edison. Otherwise, he spent his time photographing the land, people and plants of Hawaii. He did commercial work for cane and pineapple plantations, and provided tourists arriving on ocean liners with mementos, mostly photographic postcards and bound books of photographs. His photographs appeared in mainstream media, including The National Geographic Magazine. Baker wrote a memoir in 1964, titled Odyssey of a Cameraman.

His studies of the Pacific people of Hawaii are an ethnographic and environmental resource. His Racial Patterns in Hawaii and his Familiar Hawaiian Plants, document a changing environment.

Ray Jerome Baker died in Honolulu on Friday, October 27, 1972, and a funeral was held over his ashes.

== Collections and archives ==
- Bishop Museum, Honolulu. A large collection of original prints, negatives, glass plate lantern slides, and ephemera.
- Kaua'i Historical Society. A small photo album containing 187 original photographs taken by well-known Hawaii photographer, Ray Jerome Baker. Baker gave the album the title, "Kauai Over the Years - Scenes Mostly Old, Some New." The black and white images were taken by Baker on visits to Kauai between 1908 and 1961.
- Swanlund-Baker Photograph Collection, Humboldt State University Library. Large collection of correspondence and photographs from Baker's time in Northern California.

== Selected works ==
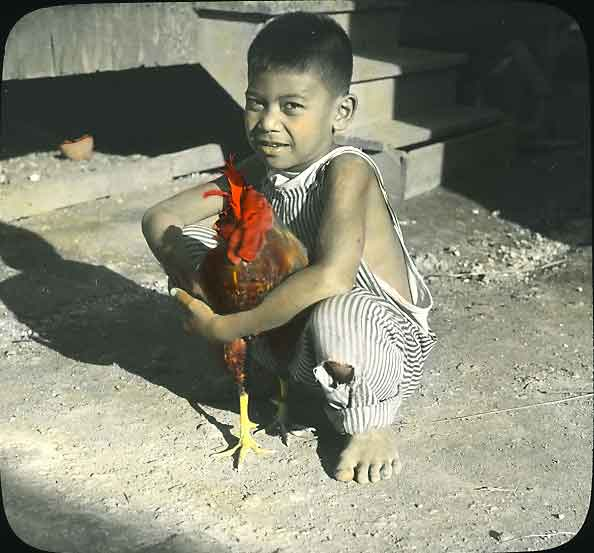
Boy with his prize fighting chicken, Ewa Plantation, 1932, hand-painted glass plate photograph

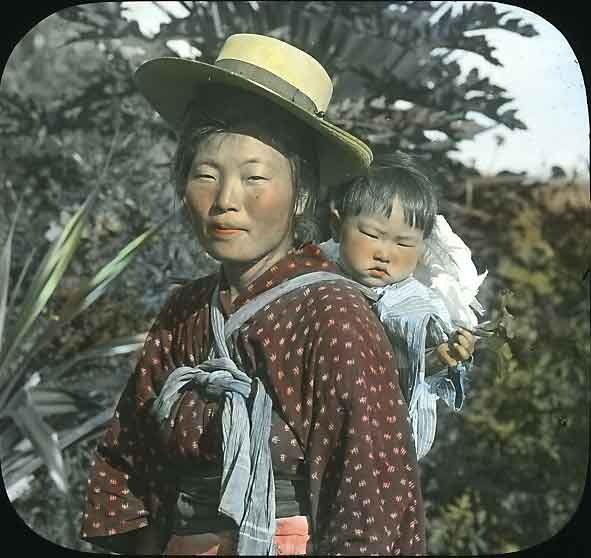
Chinese woman on Oahu with baby, hand-painted glass plate photograph

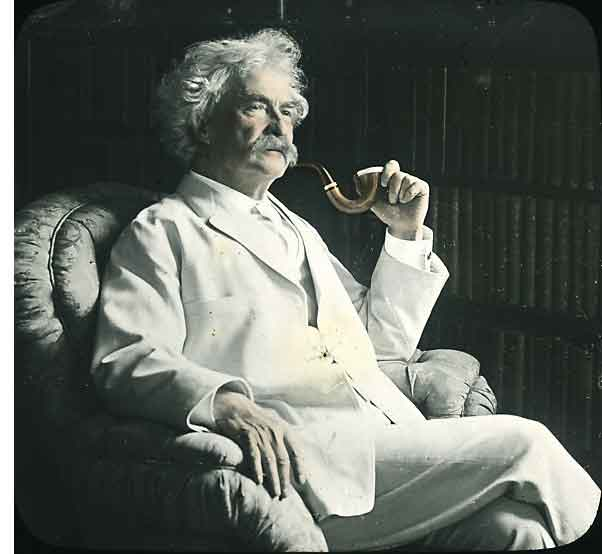
Mark Twain at home in Connecticut, hand-painted glass plate photograph

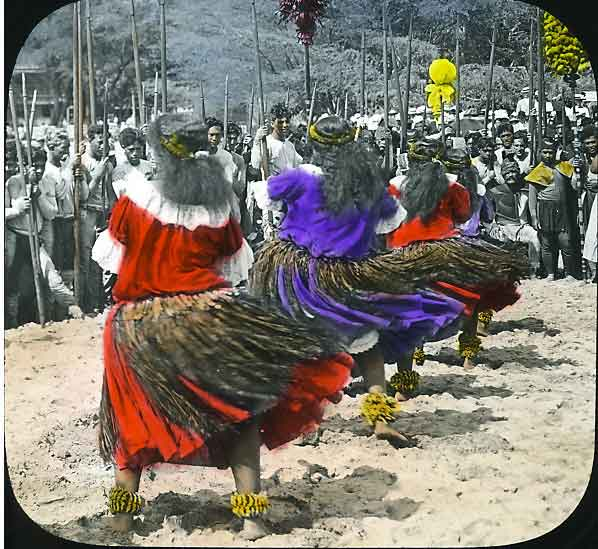
Hula Girls in Honolulu, hand-painted glass plate photograph

== Studio publications ==
- 1912–1935: Alohaland 5 in × 7 in (130 mm × 180 mm)
- 1912–1935: Hawaii 5 in × 7 in (130 mm × 180 mm)
- 1912–1935: Hawaii-Nei 5 in × 7 in (130 mm × 180 mm)
- 1914: Hawaiian Types printed booklet
- 1914: Palms and other Flora of the Hawaiian Islands printed booklet
- 1914: Hawaiian Island Views printed booklet
- 1914: Homes, Historical Buildings and Places of Interest in the Hawaiian Islands printed booklet
- 1936: The Romance of Raw Sugar
- 1938: Familiar Hawaiian Plants
- 1938: Camera Studies in Portraiture
- 1938: Hawaii the Isle of a Thousand Wonders
- 1938: Alohaland 11 in × 4 in (280 mm × 100 mm)
- 1939: Hawaiian Yesterdays
- 1941: Hawaii Then and Now
- 1943: Scenic Hawaii
- 1945: Men of our Armed Forces
- 1945: Art Forms in Plant Structures
- 1964: Odyssey of a Cameraman, a memoir
