= Mechanic Arts High School =

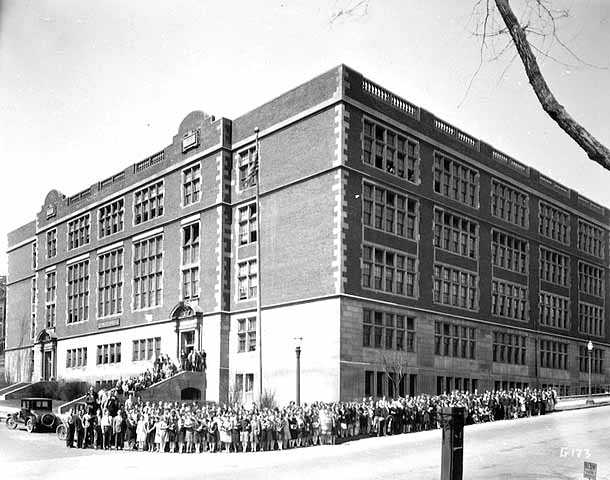
- Mechanic Arts High School in approximately 1928
- Saint Paul, Minnesota; United States

Information
- Established: 1911
- Closed: 1976
- School district: Saint Paul Public Schools
- Classrooms: 34

Mechanic Arts High School was a high school in Saint Paul, Minnesota, which operated from 1911 to 1976. The school was part of the Saint Paul Public Schools district. Located near downtown, Frogtown and the Rondo neighborhood, it was a prominent school for Saint Paul's black students.

== History ==
Started as the Manual Training Program at St. Paul High School in 1886, the program moved to the former Madison Elementary School building as Mechanical Arts High School. Created in response to a need for graduating students to directly enter the workforce of a rapidly industrializing United States, the school was recognized as the "first high school in the Upper Midwest to combine manual training with traditional academic curricula" for its first twenty years of operation (1896–1916).

Land was purchased in 1907 for the new Mechanic Arts High School building, and construction was completed in 1911. The former locations' land was sold and the building demolished in 1914 as part of the construction of the Minnesota Historical Society Building (renamed the Minnesota Judicial Center in 1992). In 1929, land was purchased for a new gym addition that was completed in 1930.

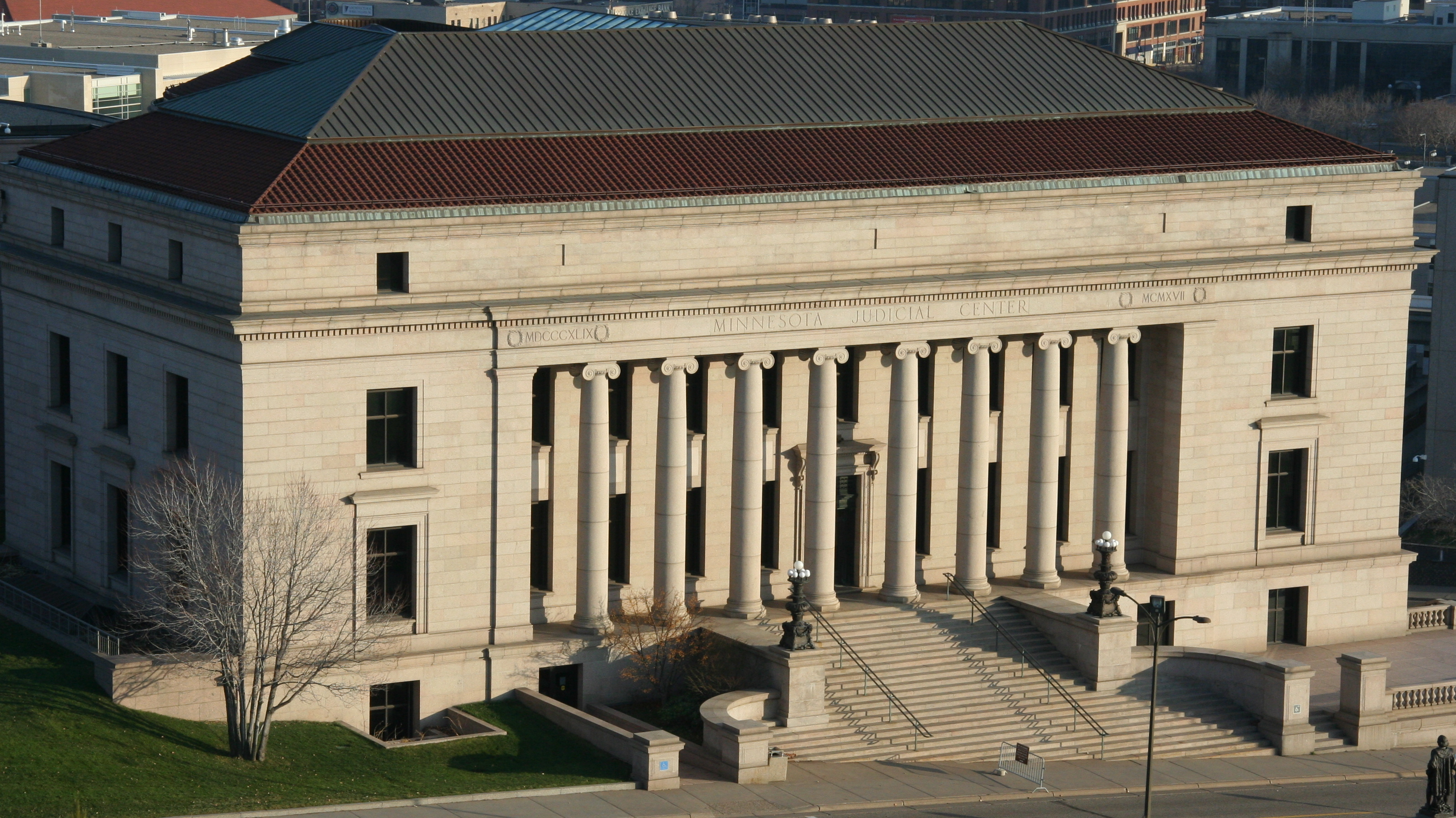
The Minnesota Judicial Center, built on the first location of Mechanic Arts

Due to a declining student population and the integration of schools, the last graduating class was in 1976 with the remaining students being consolidated between Washington Tech High School and Central High School. The building was next used to house the Open School as well as various learning centers developed to further integrate the student populous. These programs continued until the building was demolished in 1988. The current building, the Minnesota Judicial Center, displays a preserved water fountain preserved from the high school.

The M Club, the schools' athletic lettermen alumni association, still meets annually, and has awarded scholarships to local-area students for the past 70 years.

== Notable alumni ==
- Ray Jerome Baker, photographer and filmmaker
- Horace LaBissoniere, American football player and Minnesota politician
- Harry Blackmun, United States Supreme Court Justice
- Milton Halberstadt, photographer
- Arthur T. Gibbons, Minnesota legislator
- Phoebe Omlie, early female aviator
- Ervin Harold Schulz, Minnesota legislator
- Mabel Seeley, mystery writer
- Stanford J. Shaw, historian
- Joe Shiely Sr, construction contractor
- William Bushnell Stout, automotive and aviation engineer
- Roy Wilkins, civil rights activist
- Fredrick Arthur Willius, cardiologist
- Morris F. Collen, pioneer of medical informatics

== Notable teachers ==
- Mary Colter, architect and designer
