= Ervin Harold Schulz =

American politician (1911–1978)

Ervin Harold Schulz (April 21, 1911 – February 25, 1978) was an American newspaper editor, businessman, and politician.

Schulz was born in Mankato, Blue Earth, Minnesota. He lived in Saint Paul, Minnesota and went to the Saint Paul Mechanic Arts High School in Saint Paul. Schulz also sent to Macalester College in Saint Paul. Schulz was the editor and publisher of the West End Call Community Newspaper and was also involved in the insurance business. Schulz served in the Minnesota House of Representatives from 1939 to 1942.
