= Milton Halberstadt =

American photographer

Milton Halberstadt (1919–2000) was a US photographer in fine art and commercial photography who left a body of work covering genres from abstract art to commercial photography.

== Early life and education ==
Halberstadt grew up in Boston, Massachusetts, and attended the Mechanic Arts High School, which taught mechanical trades. He then studied at the Massachusetts School of Art. Afterwards, he studies at the Art Institute of Chicago and the Institute of Design (founded in 1937 as New Bauhaus by designer-painter László Moholy-Nagy). He served as an assistant to both László Moholy-Nagy and György Kepes.

He served as a US Army Air Forces navigator during World War II in the 456th Bombardment Group. While a second lieutenant, he was a navigator aboard a B-24 Liberator called "Texas Ranger" flying over Yugoslavia in 1944 when his aircraft was hit by enemy fire. Despite severe injuries, Halberstadt guided the plane down safely, and he received the Distinguished Flying Cross medal for heroism in aerial combat.

M. Halberstadt Illustration studio in San Francisco produced fine large format studio photography. Halberstadt's clients included Del Monte, Dole, S&W, Paul Masson, Pan-Am Airlines, and Royal Viking Lines.

The Milton "Hal" Halberstadt Papers and Photograph Collection resides at the University of California Davis special collections archives.

== Chronology ==
- 1919 Born
- 1936 Began professional photography career in Boston after high school. In his early work he documented the streets of his native Boston for the Works Progress Administration (WPA) National Research Project.
- 1940 Rockefeller foundation Scholarship to the School of Design, Chicago (New Bauhaus)
- 1943 Served as a navigator of a bomber during World War II
- 1945-1973 M. Halberstadt Illustration Photography Studio in San Francisco
- 1973- Taught fine photography at University of California, Berkeley, San Francisco State University and the University of Oregon
- 2000 Died

== Print references ==
- Warren, Lynne. Encyclopedia of Twentieth-century Photography CRC Press, 2006.
- Comer, Stephanie, et al. The Moment of Seeing: Minor White at the California School of Fine Arts Chronicle Books, 2006.
- Susan Ehrens. B&W Magazine Millenium Issue #5 B&W Magazine, February, 2000.
- Court, Arthur. Minerals; Nature's Fabulous Jewels, photography by Milton Halberstadt Abrams, 1974.
- Kepes, György. Language of Vision Credited as Halbe, Paul Theobald Company, 1961.
- Moholy-Nagy, Laszlo. Vision in Motion Credited as Halbe, Paul Theobald Company, 1947.
- The Editors of Time-Life Books, The Studio, Life Library of Photography, numerous printings.

== Exhibitions ==
- Contemporary Art, Museum of Fine Art, Houston, Texas, 1948.
- Pioneer Photographers Addison Gallery of American Art, Andover, Massachusetts, 1948.
- Subjektive Fotographie, 2nd International Exhibit of Modern Photography.
- State School of Arts & Crafts, Saarbrücken, Germany, 1954.
- Fine Arts Exhibit IV, Metropolitan Museum of Art, New York, 1966.
- American Photography: The Sixties, Sheldon Memorial Art Gallery, University of Nebraska, Lincoln, Nebraska, 1968.
- Affrischer Fran Califrien GavIe Museum, Stockholm, Sweden, 1968.
- Art in Embassies, A Program of the United States Dept. of State.
- Ten Californian Photographers, 1973.
- Photography + The City Smithsonian Institution, Washington, D.C., 1965.
- Retrospective: Photographs 1936-81, Douglas Elliott Galleries, San Francisco, 1981.
- Taken by Design: Photographs From the Institute of Design, 1937–1971, Art Institute of Chicago, 2002.
- A Mind at Play, Art Institute of Chicago, 2008.

== Permanent collections ==
- Addison Gallery of American Art, Andover, Massachusetts.
- George Eastman House, Rochester, New York.
- Polaroid Corporation, Cambridge, Massachusetts.
- Smithsonian Institution, Washington, D.C..
- Metropolitan Museum of Art, New York.
- The Oakland Museum of Art, Oakland, California.
- Center for Creative Photography, University of Arizona, Tucson, Arizona.

== Film ==
- Photography - The Incisive Art (Ansel Adams' series of 5 films for KQED) Professional Photography with Ansel Adams, Beaumont Newhall and others, 1960.
