= Horace LaBissoniere =

American football player and state legislator (1896–1972)

Profile
- Positions: Center, Guard

Personal information
- Born: September 13, 1896; St. Paul, Minnesota, US
- Died: January 27, 1972 (aged 75)

Career information
- College: Michigan, College of St. Thomas

Career history
- 1922: Hammond Pros

Horace C. "Tony" LaBissoniere (September 13, 1896 – January 27, 1972) was an American football player and state legislator. A native of St. Paul, Minnesota, LaBissoniere graduated from Mechanic Arts High School in St. Paul. He enrolled at the University of Michigan, where he played football for the Michigan Wolverines. He later attended the College of St. Thomas. During World War I, he served in the United States Army and was promoted to the rank of second lieutenant in the infantry. In 1922, at age 26, LaBissoniere played one year of professional football for the Hammond Pros. LaBissoniere also attended the University of Minnesota where he obtained a degree in dentistry. He served one term in the Minnesota House of Representatives from 1933 to 1935. LaBissoniere died in 1972 at age 75.
