= Greene, North Dakota =

Unincorporated community in North Dakota, U.S.

Coordinates: 48.657°N 101.701°W

Greene is an unincorporated community in Renville County in the U.S. state of North Dakota. Greene was a stop on the Minneapolis, St. Paul and Sault Ste. Marie Railroad, but now the line is operated by the Northern Plains Railroad.
