= Jessenland Township, Sibley County, Minnesota =

Jessenland Township, Minnesota
- Township
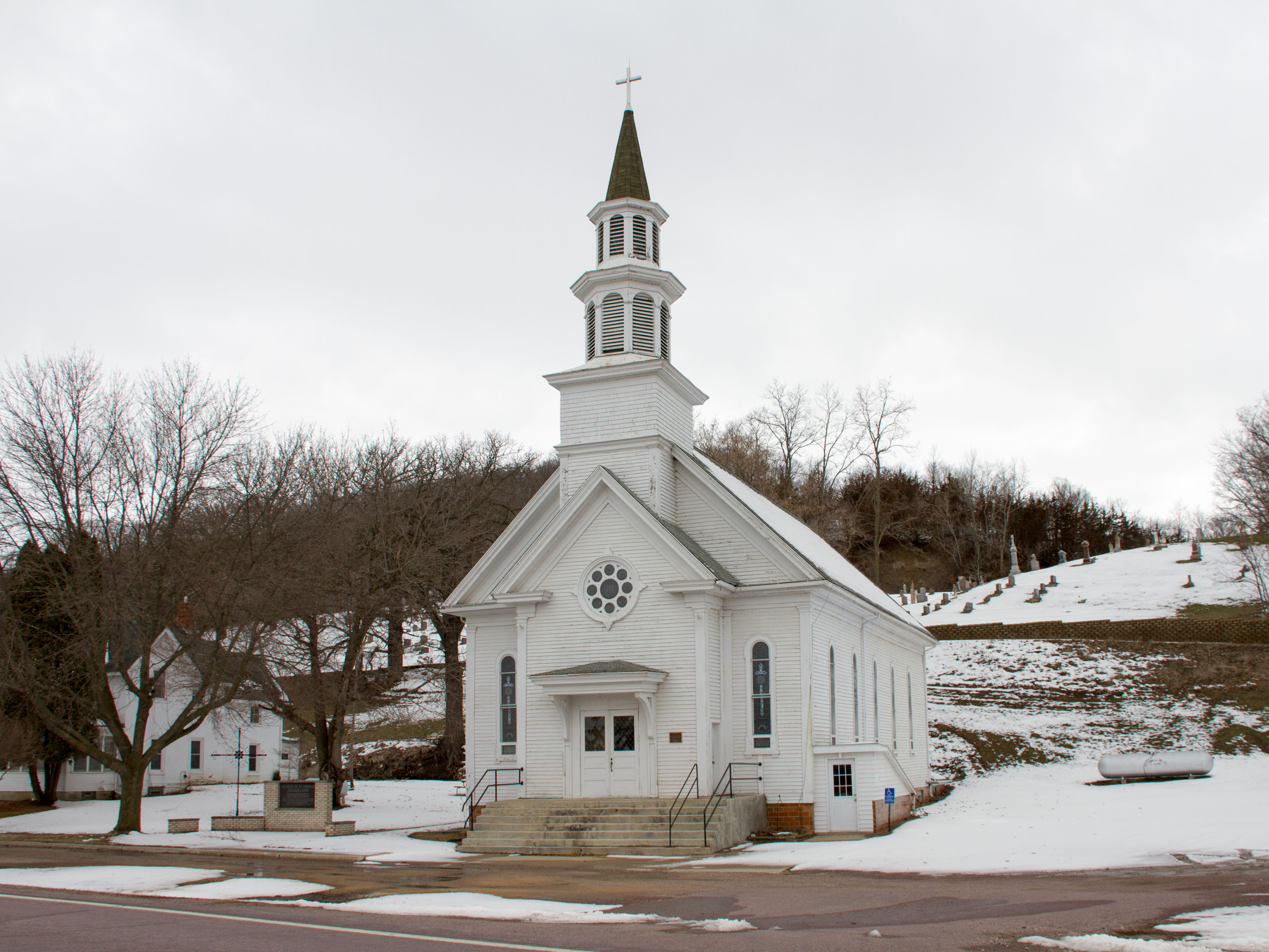
- The Church of St. Thomas, now the Jessenland Cultural and Heritage Center.

- Location within the state of Minnesota Jessenland Township, Minnesota (the United States)
- Coordinates: 44°35′40″N 93°56′50″W
- Country: United States
- State: Minnesota
- County: Sibley

Area
  - Total: 34.4 sq mi (89.1 km^{2})
  - Land: 33.2 sq mi (86.0 km^{2})
  - Water: 1.2 sq mi (3.1 km^{2})
- Elevation: 988 ft (301 m)

Population (2000)
  - Total: 481
  - Density: 15/sq mi (5.6/km^{2})
- Time zone: UTC-6 (Central (CST))
  - Summer (DST): UTC-5 (CDT)
- FIPS code: 27-31922
- GNIS feature ID: 0664581

Jessenland Township is a township in Sibley County, Minnesota, United States. The population was 481 at the 2000 census.

Jessenland Township was organized in 1858, the same year Minnesota achieved statehood.

== Geography ==
According to the United States Census Bureau, the township has a total area of 34.4 square miles (89 km^{2}), of which 33.2 square miles (86 km^{2}) is land and 1.2 square miles (3.1 km^{2}) (3.49%) is water.

== Demographics ==
As of the census of 2000, there were 481 people, 160 households, and 130 families residing in the township. The population density was 14.5 inhabitants per square mile (5.6/km^{2}). There were 165 housing units at an average density of 5.0 per square mile (1.9/km^{2}). The racial makeup of the township was 96.88% White, 0.42% Asian, 0.42% from other races, and 2.29% from two or more races. Hispanic or Latino of any race were 2.29% of the population.

There were 160 households, out of which 36.3% had children under the age of 18 living with them, 75.0% were married couples living together, 1.9% had a female householder with no husband present, and 18.8% were non-families. 13.1% of all households were made up of individuals, and 5.6% had someone living alone who was 65 years of age or older. The average household size was 3.01 and the average family size was 3.35.

In the township the population was spread out, with 30.1% under the age of 18, 6.2% from 18 to 24, 27.7% from 25 to 44, 26.2% from 45 to 64, and 9.8% who were 65 years of age or older. The median age was 38 years. For every 100 females, there were 118.6 males. For every 100 females age 18 and over, there were 118.2 males.

The median income for a household in the township was $55,000, and the median income for a family was $59,107. Males had a median income of $32,115 versus $26,042 for females. The per capita income for the township was $18,758. About 1.6% of families and 3.9% of the population were below the poverty line, including none of those under age 18 and 9.4% of those age 65 or over.

== History ==
Jessenland Town Hall and log building

Before European settlement, the area was originally inhabited by the Dakota people, who lived along the Minnesota River and used the land for hunting and fishing. Following the signing of the Treaty of Traverse des Sioux in 1851, much of the surrounding territory was opened to European-American settlers.

In 1852, three Irish Catholic brothers from County Tipperary, Ireland (Thomas, Dennis, and Walter Doheny) became recognized as the first permanent European settlers around the Jessenland Township area. Like many Irish immigrants escaping the hardships of the Great Famine.The brothers settled on land along the Minnesota River, establishing a small landing site known as Doheny’s Landing. This river access point was crucial for trade and transportation, providing an early lifeline for the surrounding settlers. Doheny’s Landing served as a supply and ferry point and helped attract other Irish Catholic families to the region. Farming, particularly wheat and livestock, sustained the early community.

The area quickly developed a reputation as a vibrant enclave of Irish culture, faith, and perseverance and soon became known as Jessenland. Some historical accounts suggest the name "Jessenland" came from Jesse Cameron, an early Protestant settler, and was meant to signify “Jesse’s Land.”

While much of the original town center no longer exists, the Church of St. Thomas remains a lasting landmark. The original log church was built in 1854, and a larger stone structure replaced it in 1870. Making St. Thomas one of the oldest Catholic churches in Minnesota. The church complex consists of an 1870 church, 1878 rectory, and a hillside cemetery whose oldest tombstone is dated 1856.

Jessenland remains a rural farming community with deep Irish-American roots.
