= Church of St. Thomas (Jessenland Township, Minnesota) =

Church complex in Minnesota, United States

- U.S. National Register of Historic Places
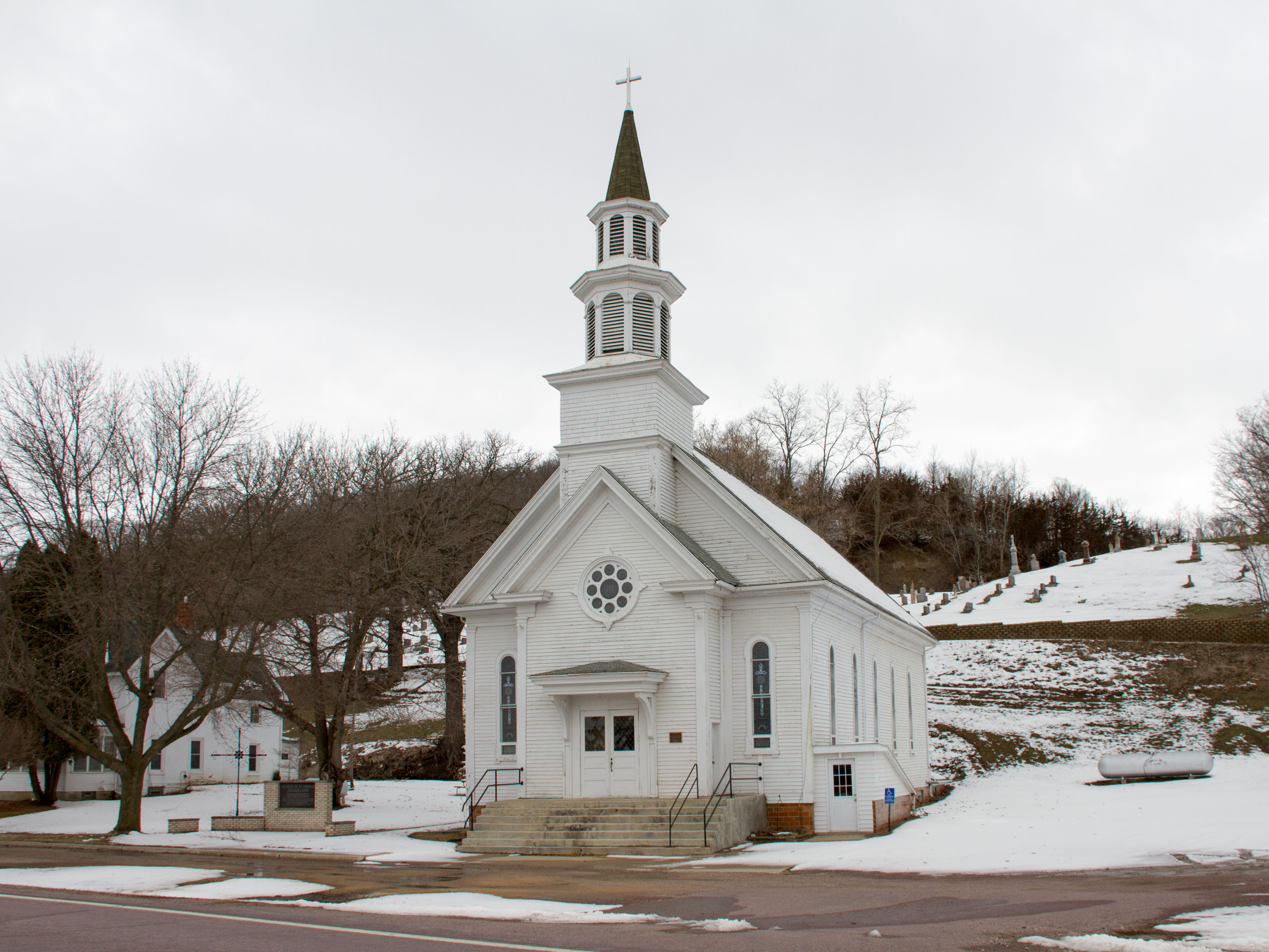
- The Church of St. Thomas viewed from the east

- Location within Minnesota Location within the United States
- Location: 31624 Scenic Byway Road, Jessenland Township, Minnesota
- Nearest city: Henderson, Minnesota
- Coordinates: 44°35′56″N 93°54′0.5″W
- Area: 5 acres (2.0 ha)
- Built: 1870 (church), 1878 (rectory), 1856 (cemetery)
- Architect: Unknown
- Architectural style: Greek Revival
- NRHP reference No.: 88003085
- Added to NRHP: September 16, 1991

The Church of St. Thomas is a former Roman Catholic church complex in Jessenland Township, Minnesota, United States. It consists of an 1870 church, 1878 rectory, and a hillside cemetery whose oldest tombstone is dated 1856. Together they are remnants of the very first agricultural settlement established by Irish Americans in Minnesota, founded here along the Minnesota River in 1852. The complex was listed on the National Register of Historic Places in 1991 for its local significance in the theme of European ethnic heritage. It was nominated for its association with Minnesota's first Irish-American farming settlement and one of the first agricultural communities in Sibley County. In 2023, the Diocese of New Ulm closed the oratory and sold the building to a non-profit organization named Friends of Jessenland. Their mission is to create an Irish cultural center. The cemetery remains in perpetual care of the Diocese.

In April of 2026, KFAI's MinneCulture podcast series featured a documentary by Kyle Shiely about the Church, its heritage and the ongoing efforts to save it.

== See also ==
- List of Catholic churches in the United States
- National Register of Historic Places listings in Sibley County, Minnesota
