= List of county roads in Carver County, Minnesota =

Highway names
- Interstates: Interstate X (I-X)
- US Highways: U.S. Highway X (US X)
- State: Trunk Highway X (MN X or TH X)
- County State-Aid Highways: County State-Aid Highway X (CSAH X)
- County Roads: County Road X (CR X)

System links
- County roads of Minnesota; Carver County

Carver County, Minnesota has several county roads. Many of them are considered county state-aid highways (CSAH). Carver County uses a white square shield to sign both CSAH and county roads. Carver County's county roads generally follow the same numbering rules that U.S. Highways follow; even-numbered county roads go east-west while odd-numbered county roads go north-south. Exceptions to this include County Roads 10, 40, 61, and 92.

For the route list, click here.

== County Road 10 ==
County Road 10 is an east-west cross-county route traversing northeast Carver County. It serves the cities of Chaska, Waconia, and Watertown. It starts at Flying Cloud Drive (County 61) and heads west as Engler Boulevard. In Waconia (west of MN 5), County Road 10 is known as 13th Street. East of MN 5, County Road 10 is known as Waconia Parkway South. It then shifts from an east-west route to a north-south route. It then has a roundabout with State Highway 7 in Watertown Township. County Road 10 then enters Watertown and is known as White Street and Territorial Street. It then has a slight overlap with State Highway 25 and then exits Watertown and travels further north to the Wright County line, continuing as County Road 13. The route is about 23 miles (37 km) long.

A spur of County Road 10 exists in Waconia, connecting State Highway 5 with County Road 10 via Orchard Road. The spur is one mile (1.6 km) long.

== County Road 11 ==
County Road 11 is a north-south cross-county route in northeastern Carver County. It serves the cities of Carver and Victoria. It starts at the Scott County line (continuing from County 9) and heads north as Jonathan Carver Parkway. It has a slight overlap with County Road 40 in Carver. Once it reaches an intersection with Engler Boulevard (County 10), it is known as Victoria Drive. The route then enters Victoria and has a slight overlap with State Highway 5. It then travels through the Carver Park Reserve and ends at a roundabout with State Highway 7. The route is about 16 miles (26 km) long.

== County Road 13 ==
County Road 13 is a short north-south route in northeastern Carver County. It serves the city of Victoria. It starts at 82nd Street (County 18) and heads north as Bavaria Road. Once it reaches State Highway 5, it is known as Rolling Acres Road. It ends at State Highway 7 soon after. The route is about two miles (3.2 km) long.

== County Road 14 ==
County Road 14 is an east-west route in eastern Carver County. It serves the cities of Chaska and Chanhassen. It starts at Victoria Drive (County 11) in Laketown Township and heads east as Pioneer Trail. It has a major intersection with State Highway 41 in Chaska and State Highway 101 in Chanhassen. It continues to the Hennepin County line, where it continues as County Road 1. The route is about seven miles (11 km) long.

== County Road 15 ==
County Road 15 is a north-south route in eastern Carver County. It serves the cities of Chaska and Chanhassen. It starts at Flying Cloud Drive (County 61) and heads north as Audubon Road. It then has a slight overlap with Lyman Boulevard (County 18). It then continues as Galpin Boulevard into Chanhassen until it reaches State Highway 5, where it continues as County 117. The route is about five miles (8 km) long.

== County Road 17 ==
County Road 17 is a north-south route in eastern Carver County. It serves the city of Chanhassen. It starts at Pioneer Trail (County 14) and heads north as Powers Boulevard. It has major intersections with both County Road 18 and State Highway 5. It continues to the Hennepin County line, where it is known as County Road 82. The route is about five miles (8 km) long.

== County Road 18 ==
County Road 18 is split up into two east-west segments in northeastern Carver County. They serve the cities of Victoria, Chaska, and Chanhassen. The first segment starts at Church Lake Boulevard (County 43) in Victoria and heads east. It then ends at Bavaria Road (County 13) near the Minnesota Landscape Arboretum. The second segment starts at a dead end in Chaska near State Highway 41 and heads east as Lyman Boulevard. It ends at State Highway 101 / County Road 101 in Chanhassen. The combined length of the two segments is about five miles (8 km).

== County Road 20 ==
County Road 20 is an east-west cross-county route in northern Carver County. It serves the city of Watertown. It starts at the McLeod County line (continuing from County 6) and heads east. It has a slight overlap with County Road 33 in Hollywood Township. It also has a slight overlap with both State Highway 25 and County Road 10 in Watertown and Watertown Township. It then exits Watertown on its own path and ends at the Hennepin County line, where it continues as County Road 6. It is about 14 miles (23 km) long.

== County Road 21 ==
County Road 21 is a north-south county route in northwestern Carver County. It serves Hollywood Township. It starts at State Highway 7 and travels north to the Wright County line, where it continues as County Road 10. It is about five miles (8 km) long.

== County Road 23 ==
County Road 23 is a short north-south county route in west-central Carver County. It serves the city of Mayer. It starts at First Street (County 30) and heads north as Bluejay Avenue. Outside of Mayer, it is known as just "County Road 23". It ends at State Highway 7 and continues as County Road 123. The route is about one mile (1.6 km) long.

== County Road 24 ==
County Road 24 is an east-west county route in northern Carver County. It serves the city of Watertown. It starts at White Street (County 10) and heads east. It ends at the Hennepin County line, where it continues as County Road 15. It is about four miles (6.4 km) long.

== County Road 27 ==
County Road 27 is a short north-south route in northern Carver County. It serves the city of Watertown. It starts at Territorial Street (County 10 / 20) and heads north as Lewis Avenue. It ends at the Wright County line, where it continues as County Road 16. The route is about two miles (3.2 km) long.

== County Road 30 ==
County Road 30 is an east-west route in western Carver County. It serves the cities of New Germany, Mayer, and Waconia. It starts at the McLeod County line (continuing from County 23) and heads east. In New Germany, it has a slight overlap with County 33 (State Avenue) before turning right onto Broadway Street. In Mayer, County 30 is known as First Street. It then has a slight overlap with State Highway 25 before turning left back onto its original alignment. It then ends at Waconia Parkway (County 10) in Waconia Township. County Road 30 used to travel through Waconia and end at the Hennepin County line via present-day County Road 92. The current route is about 11 miles (18 km) long.

== County Road 31 ==
County Road 31 is a north-south route in southwestern Carver County. It serves the city of Norwood Young America. It starts at County Road 50 in Young America Township and heads north. It then turns right onto Elm Street in Norwood Young America and ends at Morse Street (County 33) in Norwood Young America. It is about four miles (6.4 km) long.

A westward spur of County Road 31 exists, connecting County Road 31 with U.S. 212 in Young America Township. That segment is about one-half mile (0.8 km) long.

== County Road 32 ==
County Road 32 is an east-west route in western Carver County. It serves the city of Waconia. It starts at County Road 30 in Camden Township and heads south. It then shifts to an east-west route and has a major intersection with State Highway 25 and County Road 51 before ending at Waconia Parkway (County 10) in Waconia Township. A second segment of the route used to travel along 13th Street in Waconia from State Highway 5 to County Road 10. It has since been replaced by County Road 10. The current route is about nine miles (14 km) long.

== County Road 33 ==
County Road 33 is a north-south route in western Carver County. It serves the cities of Norwood Young America and New Germany. It starts at the Sibley County line (continuing from County 5) and heads north. It then has a very slight overlap with County Road 52 in the unincorporated town of Assumption. It then has another slight overlap; this time with County Road 50 in Young America Township before branching off into Norwood Young America. There, it follows Oak, Elm, Morse, Railroad, and Reform Streets. Soon after, it has a major intersection with U.S. 212 / State Highway 5 / State Highway 25. It then passes through New Germany, where it is known as State Avenue. It then has a major intersection with State Highway 7 in Hollywood Township. It then has a slight overlap with County Road 20 in Hollywood Township before reaching the Wright County line, where it continues as County Road 8. The route is about 24 miles (39 km) long.

== County Road 34 ==
County Road 34 is an east-west route in western Carver County. It serves the city of Norwood Young America. It starts at the McLeod County line (continuing from County 3) and heads east. In Norwood Young America, it has a major intersection with State Highway 5. After the intersection, County 34 is known as First Street, Central Avenue, Main Street, Third Avenue, and Tacoma Avenue until it ends at U.S. 212. The route is about six miles (9.7 km) long.

== County Road 36 ==
County Road 36 is an east-west route in south-central Carver County. It serves the city of Cologne. It starts at U.S. 212 in Benton Township and heads east through Cologne and ends back at U.S. 212 in Dahlgren Township. The route is about 2.5 miles (4 km) long. It was established in 1972 after a bypass was built for U.S. 212 around Cologne, and took the place of the old U.S. 212 route. This route could be considered a business spur of U.S. 212.

== County Road 40 ==
County Road 40 is a northeast-southwest route in southeastern Carver County. It mostly follows the course of the Minnesota River. It also serves the city of Carver. It starts at Chaska Boulevard (County 61) in Carver and heads south as Old Carver Road. In downtown Carver, it is known as Fourth Street before turning left onto Broadway Street, then right onto Main Street. It then turns left onto Jonathan Carver Parkway (County 11). Instead of turning Jordan-bound with County 11, it keeps going straight. Ten miles (16 km) later, it ends at State Highway 25 in San Francisco Township, where it continues as Sibley County Road 6. The route is about 13 miles (21 km) long.

== County Road 41 ==
County Road 41 is a north-south route in southeastern Carver County. It serves San Francisco Township and Dahlgren Township. It starts at County Road 52 in San Francisco Township and heads north. It has a major intersection with County Road 50 on the San Francisco-Dahlgren Township border. County Road 41 zig-zags and turns right onto Market Avenue. It then has a major intersection with U.S. 212. It ends at County Road 36 near Cologne. The route is about seven miles (11 km) long.

== County Road 43 ==
County Road 43 is a north-south route in eastern Carver County. It serves the city of Victoria. It starts at County Road 50 in East Union and heads north. It has an intersection with U.S. 212, also in Dahlgren Township. In Laketown Township, it has a slight overlap with County Road 10 before turning right onto Church Lake Boulevard into Victoria, where it ends at Victoria Drive (County 11) and continues as County Road 18. The route is about 11 miles (18 km) long.

== County Road 44 ==
County Road 44 is an east-west route in eastern Carver County. It serves the city of Chaska. This route used to be the CSAH portion of County Road 140, but that portion was renumbered. It starts at the intersection with County Roads 43 and 140 in Dahlgren Township and heads east as Big Woods Boulevard. It then ends at Chaska Boulevard (County 61) in Chaska. The route is about four miles (6.4 km) long.

== County Road 45 ==
County Road 45 was a north-south route in southeastern Carver County. It served San Francisco Township and Dahlgren Township. It started at the Scott County line (continuing from County 9) and ended at County Road 40. The route was about 4 miles (6.4 km) in length. The route is known today as the southernmost portion of County Road 11.

== County Road 50 ==
County Road 50 is an east-west cross-county route in southern Carver County. It serves the city of Hamburg. It starts at Jonathan Carver Parkway (County 11) in San Francisco Township and heads west until County Road 51 in Benton Township. It then has a slight overlap with County Road 51 for about one mile (1.6 km) before turning left. In Hamburg, County Road 50 is known as Park Avenue, Railroad Street, Henrietta Avenue, Jacob Street, and Broadway Avenue, after which it exits Hamburg. County Road 50 continues heading west to the McLeod County line, where it turns left on Zebra Avenue and reaches the Sibley County line, where it continues as County Road 11. The route is 20 miles (32 km) long.

== County Road 51 ==
County Road 51 is a north-south route in south-central Carver County. It serves Hancock Township, Benton Township, and Waconia Township. It starts at County Road 52 / 151 and heads north. It has two major intersections; one with U.S. 212 and one with State Highway 5. It ends at County Road 32 in Waconia Township. The route is about 11 miles (18 km) long. The section between State Highway 5 and County Road 32 used to be a second segment of County Road 151, but it became a part of County Road 51.

== County Road 52 ==
County Road 52 is an east-west route in southern Carver County. It serves Hancock Township and San Francisco Township. It starts at County Road 33 and heads east. It has intersections with county roads 51, 53, and 41 before ending at County Road 40 in San Francisco Township. The route is about eight miles (13 km) long.

== County Road 53 ==
County Road 53 is a north-south route in south-central Carver County. It serves the city of Cologne. It starts at the Sibley County line (continuing from County 14) and heads north. It has major intersections with County Roads 52 and 50. It ends at a reduced-conflict intersection with U.S. 212 and State Highway 284 in Cologne. The route is about 6.5 miles (10.5 km) long.

== County Road 57 ==
County Road 57 was a short north-south route in central Carver County. It served the city of Waconia. It started at the junction of State Highways 5 and 284 and headed north as Olive Street before ending at Main Street (old County 59). The route was about one-half mile (0.8 km) long.

== County Road 59 ==
County Road 59 is a short north-south route in central Carver County. It serves the city of Waconia. It starts at Engler Boulevard (County 10) in Waconia and heads north as Main Street. It ends at State Highway 5 in Waconia Township. The route is about 0.7 miles (1.1 km) long. County Road 59 used to continue north of State Highway 5 into downtown Waconia (via the old route of County Road 30) and end at County Road 57, but that section was removed.

== County Road 61 ==
County Road 61 is an east-west route in eastern Carver County. It serves the city of Chaska and Chanhassen. It starts at Jonathan Carver Parkway (County 11) and heads east as Chaska Boulevard. It has a major intersection with State Highway 41 in Chaska. Once it reaches County Road 10, it is known as Flying Cloud Drive. It has another major intersection with State Highway 101 and County Road 101 in Chanhassen. It then continues to the Hennepin County line, where it continues as County Road 61. The route is about seven miles (11 km) long. This route used to be old U.S. 212 before it was shifted onto the nearby freeway that was originally known as State Highway 312.

== County Road 92 ==
County Road 92 is a short north-south route in central Carver County. It serves Laketown Township. It starts at State Highway 5 and heads north as Laketown Parkway. It has an intersection with County Road 155 before ending at the Hennepin County line, where it continues as County 92. The route is about three miles (4.8 km) long. The route used to be a part of County Road 30. Crown College is located along the route.

== County Road 101 ==
County Road 101 is split into two north-south segments. They serve the city of Chanhassen. The first one starts at the Scott County line (continuing from County 101) and heads north. It ends at County 61. The second segment starts at County 14 and heads north as Great Plains Boulevard and Market Boulevard before ending at State Highway 5. The combined segments have a total length of three miles (4.8 km). The routes used to be portions of State Highway 101 that were turned back to Carver County maintenance.

== Route list ==
Number	Length (mi)	Length (km)	Southern or western terminus	Northern or eastern terminus	Local names	Formed	Removed	Notes
CSAH 10	23.2	37.3	County 61 in Chaska	Wright County Line (County 13)	Engler Boulevard (Chaska); 13th Street, Waconia Parkway South (Waconia); White Street, Territorial Street (Watertown)	—	—	
CSAH 10	1	1.6	MN 5 in Waconia Township	County 10 in Waconia Township	Orchard Road	c. 2019	current	Spur of CSAH 10 providing a more direct connection between it and MN 5
CSAH 11	15.7	25.3	Scott County Line (County 9)	MN 7 in Victoria	Jonathan Carver Parkway (S of County 10); Victoria Drive (N of County 10)	—	—	Southernmost section originally County 45
CR 11	4.7	7.6	Shady Oak Drive and County 11 in Victoria	County 61 in Chaska	Shady Oak Drive, Victoria Drive (Chaska), Crosstown Boulevard	—	c. 2006	Southern segment; this old alignment was slowly removed or replaced with trails until the rest was turned back to local management in 2006.
CSAH 13	1.9	3.1	County 18 in Victoria	MN 7 in Victoria	Bavaria Road (S of MN 5); Rolling Acres Road (N of MN 5)	—	—	
CSAH 14	8.7	14.0	County 11 in Victoria	Hennepin County Line (County 1)	Pioneer Trail	—	—	
CSAH 15	4.6	7.4	County 61 in Chaska	MN 5 and County 117 in Chanhassen	Audubon Road; Lyman Boulevard; Galpin Road	—	—	Northernmost section originally part of County 19
CSAH 17	4.6	7.4	County 14 in Chanhassen	Hennepin County Line (County 82)	Powers Boulevard	—	—	
CSAH 18	1.3	2.1	County 11 and County 43 in Victoria	County 13 in Victoria	82nd Street	—	—	Western Segment
CSAH 18	4.6	7.4	Dead end near MN 41 in Chaska	County 101 in Chanhassen	Lyman Boulevard	—	—	Eastern Segment
CSAH 19	1	1.6	County 18 in Chanhassen	MN 5 and County 117 in Chanhassen	Galpin Road	—	c. 2008	Became part of County 15.
CSAH 20	7.7	12.4	McLeod County Line (County 6)	MN 25 in Watertown Township		—	—	Western Segment
CSAH 20	4.2	6.8	County 10 in Watertown	Hennepin County Line (County 6)		—	—	Eastern Segment
CSAH 21	5	8.0	MN 7 in Hollywood Township	Wright County Line (County 10)		—	—	
CSAH 23	1.4	2.3	County 30 in Mayer	MN 7 and County 123 on the Hollywood/Watertown township line	Bluejay Avenue (Mayer)	—	—	
CSAH 24	3.7	6.0	County 10 in Watertown	Hennepin County Line (County 15)		—	—	
CSAH 27	1.8	2.9	County 10 in Watertown	Wright County Line (County 16)	Lewis Avenue (Watertown)	—	—	
CSAH 30	11.1	17.9	McLeod County Line (County 23)	County 10 in Waconia Township	State Avenue, Broadway Street (New Germany); 1st Street, MN 25 (Mayer)	—	—	Originally continued to the Hennepin County line via present-day CSAH 59 and CSAH 92
CSAH 31	4.5	7.2	Sibley County Line (County 16)	The other County 31 in Young America Township	Upton Road; CSAH 50; Vera Avenue (Young America Twp.)	—	—	
CSAH 31	1.6	2.6	U.S. 212 in Young America Township	County 33 in Norwood Young America	Elm Street (Norwood Young America)	—	—	
CSAH 32	8.9	14.3	County 30 in Camden Township	County 10 in Waconia Township		—	—	Originally continued into Waconia via present-day CSAH 10
CSAH 33	23.9	38.5	Sibley County Line (County 5)	Wright County Line (County 8)	Oak Street, Elm Street, Morse Street, Railroad Street, Reform Street (Norwood Young America); State Avenue (New Germany)	—	—	
CSAH 34	6.3	10.1	McLeod County Line (County 3)	U.S. 212 in Norwood Young America	1st Street, Central Avenue, Main Street, 3rd Avenue, Tacoma Avenue (Norwood Young America)	—	—	
CSAH 36	2.5	4.0	U.S. 212 in Cologne	U.S. 212 in Dahlgren Township	Lake Street (Cologne)	c. 1972	current	Old U.S. 212; established after a bypass was built for U.S. 212 around Cologne in 1972
CSAH 40	13.1	21.1	Sibley County Line (County 6)	County 61 in Chaska	Jonathan Carver Parkway, Main Street, Broadway Street, 4th Street (Carver)	—	—	
CSAH 41	7.3	11.7	County 52 in San Francisco Township	County 36 on the Benton/Dahlgren township line		—	—	
CSAH 43	10.8	17.4	County 50 on the San Francisco/Dahlgren township line	County 11 and County 18 in Victoria	Church Lake Boulevard (Victoria)	—	—	
CSAH 44	3.9	6.3	County 43 and County 140 in Dahlgren Township	County 61 in Chaska	Big Woods Boulevard	c. 2013	current	
CSAH 45	3.8	6.1	Scott County Line (County 9)	County 40 in Dahlgren Township		—	c. 2006	Became part of County 11.
CSAH 50	19.9	32.0	Sibley County Line (County 11)	County 11 in San Francisco Township	Zebra Avenue (Young America Twp.); Broadway Avenue, Jacob Street, Henrietta Avenue, Railroad Street, Park Avenue (Hamburg)	—	—	
CSAH 51	12.1	19.5	County 52 and County 151 in Hancock Township	County 32 in Waconia Township		—	—	Section north of MN 5 section originally County 151
CSAH 52	8	13	County 33 in Hancock Township	County 40 in San Francisco Township		—	—	
CSAH 53	6.5	10.5	Sibley County Line (County 14)	U.S. 212 and MN 284 in Cologne	Paul Street (Cologne)	—	—	Superstreet intersection with U.S. 212
CSAH 57	0.5	0.80	MN 5 and MN 284 in Waconia	Main Street (Old County 59 and 30) in Waconia	Olive Street	—	c. 2015	Turned back to local maintenance.
CSAH 59	0.7	1.1	County 10 in Waconia	MN 5 in Waconia	Main Street	—	—	Originally ended at CSAH 57 via Main Street/Old County 30; that section turned back to local maintenance circa 2011.
CSAH 61	7.2	11.6	County 11 in Chaska	Hennepin County Line (County 61)	Chaska Boulevard (W of County 10); Flying Cloud Drive (E of County 10)	c. 2008	current	Old U.S. 212
CSAH 92	2.5	4.0	MN 5 in Waconia	Hennepin County Line (County 92)		—	—	Old County 30
CSAH 101	0.7	1.1	Scott County Line (County 101)	County 61 in Chanhassen		1988	current	Southern Segment; old MN 101
CSAH 101	2.4	3.9	County 14 and MN 101 in Chanhassen	MN 5 in Chanhassen	Great Plains Boulevard; Market Boulevard	1988	current	Northern Segment; old MN 101
CR 110	1.3	2.1	County 10 in Laketown Township	County 10 in Laketown Township	Klein Drive	c. 2010	c. 2013	Western Segment; turned back to local maintenance.
CR 110	2.6	4.2	County 10 in Dahlgren Township	County 61 in Chaska	Creek Road	—	c. 2006	Eastern Segment; turned back to local maintenance.
CR 111	1.1	1.8	County 14 in Chaska	County 11 in Victoria	Shady Oak Drive	—	—	
CR 111	1	1.6	County 11 in Dahlgren Township	Pioneer Trail in Chaska	Pioneer Trail	—	c. 2006	Became part of County 14
CR 117	2.1	3.4	MN 5 and County 15 in Chanhassen	Hennepin County Line	Galpin Road	—	—	
CR 122	6.4	10.3	County 33 in Hollywood Township	MN 25 in Watertown Township		—	—	
CR 123	3.7	6.0	MN 7 and County 23 on the Hollywood/Watertown township line	County 122 in Watertown Township		—	—	
CR 127	1.7	2.7	County 20 in Watertown Township	County 24 in Watertown Township		—	—	
CR 131	1.7	2.7	U.S. 212 and MN 5 / 25 in Young America Township	County 34 in Young America Township		—	—	
CR 133	0.5	0.80	County 20 in Hollywood Township	Wright County Line		—	—	
CR 135	3.7	6.0	County 33 on the Young America/Camden township line	County 32 in Camden Township		—	—	
CR 140	13.7	22.0	County 50 in Benton Township	County 43 and County 44 in Dahlgren Township		—	—	Section between County 50 and MN 284 originally County 153; easternmost section became County 44
CR 141	3.5	5.6	County 10 in Laketown Township	MN 5 in Laketown Township	Laketown Road	—	—	
CR 147	5.4	8.7	County 40 in Carver	County 14 in Chaska	Broadway Street, Jonathan Carver Parkway (only after decommissioned), Guernsey Avenue, Victoria Drive (only after decommissioned)	—	c. 2001	Portion north of U.S. 212 became part of County 11 after that road became Jonathan Carver Parkway, and portion south of U.S. 212 (Broadway Street) was turned back to local management and later closed permanently.
CR 151	1	1.6	Sibley County Line (County 160)	County 52 in Hancock Township		—	—	
CR 151	2.1	3.4	MN 5 and County 51 in Waconia Township	County 32 in Waconia Township		—	c. 2016	Northern Segment; became part of County 51.
CR 152	3	4.8	County 51 in Benton Township	County 53 in Benton Township		—	—	
CR 153	7	11	County 50 in Benton Township	MN 284 in Benton Township		—	c. 2019	Became part of County 140.
CR 155	2.8	4.5	County 92 in Laketown Township	MN 7 in Watertown Township		—	—	
Former
