= Dahlgren, Minnesota =

Unincorporated community in Minnesota, US

Dahlgren
- Unincorporated community
- Location within Minnesota Location within the United States
- Coordinates: 44°46′36″N 93°41′01″W
- Country: United States
- State: Minnesota
- County: Carver
- Township: Dahlgren Township
- Elevation: 974 ft (297 m)
- Time zone: UTC-6 (Central (CST))
  - Summer (DST): UTC-5 (CDT)
- ZIP code: 55318 and 55322
- Area code: 952
- GNIS feature ID: 654662

Dahlgren is an unincorporated community in Dahlgren Township, Carver County, Minnesota, United States. The community is located along Highway 212 at Carver County Road 43 near Chaska and Cologne.
