= East Union, Minnesota =

Unincorporated community in Minnesota, US

East Union
- Unincorporated community
- Location within Minnesota Location within the United States
- Coordinates: 44°43′05″N 93°40′54″W
- Country: United States
- State: Minnesota
- County: Carver
- Township: Dahlgren Township and San Francisco Township
- Elevation: 856 ft (261 m)
- Time zone: UTC-6 (Central (CST))
  - Summer (DST): UTC-5 (CDT)
- Area code: 952
- GNIS feature ID: 643115

East Union is an unincorporated community in Carver County, Minnesota, United States.

The community lies on the boundary line between Dahlgren Township and San Francisco Township. The center of East Union is generally considered at the junction of Carver County Roads 40, 43, and 50. Nearby places include Chaska, Carver, and Cologne. Bevens Creek flows through the community.

== History ==
The area was originally settled by Swedish immigrants in 1854, who traveled up the nearby Minnesota River via flatboat. They established King Oscar's Settlement, which later divided into the parishes of East Union and West Union. East Union Lutheran Church and its parish hall are listed on the National Register of Historic Places as King Oscar's Settlement. West Union was split off as a separate parish, 9 miles (14 km) west, so worshipers wouldn't have to travel so far. Gustavus Adolphus College was founded in East Union in 1862; the college is now in St. Peter, Minnesota.

== Schools ==
East Union Elementary School, a part of the Eastern Carver County School District (Independent School District 112) was a school serving kindergarten through 5th grade located in East Union. It opened in 1965 and consists of a single hallway with classrooms, front office space, a music room, and a gymnasium that doubles as the cafeteria. East Union Elementary was permanently closed in 2024 following a failed tax levy referendum.

== Notable people ==
- Andrew Holt, Minnesota Supreme Court justice, was born in East Union.
