= Waconia Township, Carver County, Minnesota =

Township in Minnesota, United States

Waconia
- Township
- Motto: "Out Of Water....Comes Life"
- Location within the state of Minnesota Waconia (the United States)
- Coordinates: 44°50′27″N 93°50′2″W
- Country: United States
- State: Minnesota
- County: Carver
- Named after: Lake Waconia

Area
  - Total: 32.5 sq mi (84.2 km^{2})
  - Land: 27.1 sq mi (70.2 km^{2})
  - Water: 5.4 sq mi (14.0 km^{2})
- Elevation: 971 ft (296 m)

Population (2020)
  - Total: 1,068
- Time zone: UTC-6 (Central (CST))
  - Summer (DST): UTC-5 (CDT)
- ZIP code: 55387
- Area code: 952
- FIPS code: 27-67450
- GNIS feature ID: 0665887
- Website: https://waconiatwsp.gov/

Waconia Township is a rural township in Carver County, Minnesota, United States. The population was 1,068 as of the 2020 census.

== History ==
Waconia Township was organized in 1858, and named after Lake Waconia.

== Geography ==
According to the United States Census Bureau, the township has a total area of 32.5 square miles (84.2 km^{2}), of which 27.1 square miles (70.2 km^{2}) is land and 5.4 square miles (14.0 km^{2}) (16.58%) is water.

The southeast quarter of the city of Mayer and the entire city of Waconia are located within the township geographically but are separate entities.

Township 116 North, Range 25 West, Fifth Principal Meridian of the Public Land Survey System.

=== Lakes ===
- Burandt Lake (west three-quarters)
- Donders Lake
- Goose Lake (south three-quarters)
- Hydes Lake
- Lake Patterson
- Lake Waconia (west three-quarters)
- Rice Lake (northeast edge)
- Rutz Lake
- Swan Lake

=== Adjacent townships ===
- Watertown Township (north)
- Laketown Township (east)
- Dahlgren Township (southeast)
- Benton Township (south)
- Young America Township (southwest)
- Camden Township (west)

=== Unincorporated community ===
- Maple

=== Cemeteries ===
The township contains three cemeteries: Rutz Lake, Saint Josephs and Waconia Public.

=== Major highways ===
- Minnesota State Highway 5
- Minnesota State Highway 25

== Demographics ==
Historical population
Census	Pop.	Note	%±
1860	466		—
1870	1,097		135.4%
1880	1,288		17.4%
1890	1,206		−6.4%
1900	1,191		−1.2%
1910	982		−17.5%
1920	960		−2.2%
1930	908		−5.4%
1940	889		−2.1%
1950	904		1.7%
1960	1,034		14.4%
1970	1,389		34.3%
1980	1,402		0.9%
1990	1,287		−8.2%
2000	1,284		−0.2%
2010	1,228		−4.4%
2020	1,068		−13.0%
U.S. Decennial Census

As of the census of 2000, there were 1,284 people, 429 households, and 349 families residing in the township. The population density was 47.4 inhabitants per square mile (18.3/km^{2}). There were 443 housing units at an average density of 16.3/sq mi (6.3/km^{2}). The racial makeup of the township was 99.14% White, 0.08% Native American, 0.23% Asian, 0.08% from other races, and 0.47% from two or more races. Hispanic or Latino of any race were 0.16% of the population.

There were 429 households of out of which 38.7% had children under the age of 18 living with them, 74.4% were married couples living together, 3.7% had a female householder with no husband present, and 18.6% were non-families. 12.8% of all households were made up of individuals, and 3.7% had someone living alone who was 65 years of age or older. The average household size was 2.99 and the average family size was 3.30.

In the township the population was spread out, with 30.7% under the age of 18, 6.5% from 18 to 24, 29.8% from 25 to 44, 23.9% from 45 to 64, and 9.0% who were 65 years of age or older. The median age was 38 years. For every 100 females, there were 103.5 males. For every 100 females age 18 and over, there were 106.0 males.

The median income for a household in the township was $76,113, and the median income for a family was $76,782. Males had a median income of $46,563 versus $35,132 for females. The per capita income for the township was $27,437. About 2.1% of families and 2.9% of the population were below the poverty line, including 1.9% of those under age 18 and 10.7% of those age 65 or over.

== Politics ==
Presidential election results

Precinct General Election Results
Year	Republican	Democratic	Third parties
2020	69.7% 556	29.2% 233	1.1% 9
2016	66.3% 490	26.0% 192	7.7% 57
2012	65.8% 518	33.2% 261	1.0% 8
2008	63.7% 475	34.3% 256	2.0% 15
2004	66.5% 521	32.3% 253	1.2% 9
2000	61.0% 421	31.2% 215	7.8% 54
1996	46.1% 274	35.6% 212	18.3% 109
1992	43.5% 300	25.0% 172	31.5% 217
1988	66.8% 426	33.2% 212	0.0% 0
1984	67.3% 397	32.7% 193	0.0% 0
1980	60.3% 372	31.9% 197	7.8% 48
1976	54.2% 330	43.2% 263	2.6% 16
1968	58.7% 304	35.5% 184	5.8% 30
1964	52.5% 241	47.5% 218	0.0% 0
1960	54.9% 240	44.9% 196	0.2% 1
