= Coney Island, Minnesota =

Unincorporated community in Minnesota, US

Coney Island
- Unincorporated community
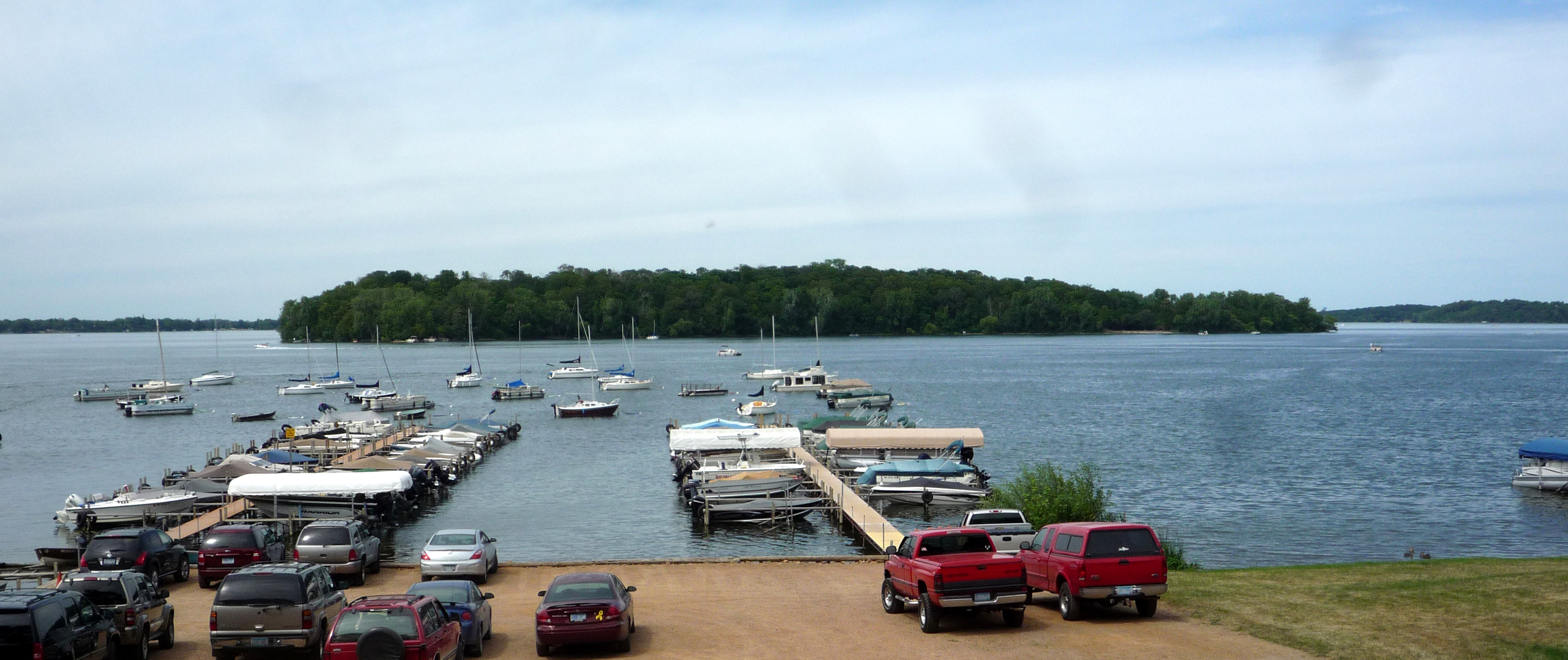
- The namesake lake island

- Location within Minnesota Location within the United States
- Coordinates: 44°51′18″N 93°45′41″W
- Country: United States
- State: Minnesota
- County: Carver
- Township: Laketown Township
- Elevation: 971 ft (296 m)
- Time zone: UTC-6 (Central (CST))
  - Summer (DST): UTC-5 (CDT)
- ZIP code: 55387
- Area code: 952
- GNIS feature ID: 1815278

Coney Island is an unincorporated community in Laketown Township, Carver County, Minnesota, United States. The community is located along Highway 5 at Laketown Parkway near Waconia and St. Bonifacius.

Coney Island took its name from a nearby lake island, which was a popular summer resort.
