= Cologne: From the Diary of Ray and Esther =

1939 film

- Directed by: Esther Dowidat, Raymond Dowidat
- Starring: 'Old Man' Guettler, Hans Guettler, Bill Guettler, Esther Dowidat
- Release date: 1939
- Running time: 14 minutes
- Country: United States

Cologne: From the Diary of Ray and Esther is a 1939 short documentary film which deals with the German-American community on the eve of World War II. It was filmed and directed by amateur filmmakers Esther Dowidat and Raymond Dowidat, residents of Cologne, Minnesota.

In 2001, this fourteen-minute film was selected for preservation in the United States National Film Registry by the Library of Congress as being "culturally, historically or aesthetically significant".
