= Laketown Township, Carver County, Minnesota =

Township in Minnesota, United States

Laketown
- Township
- Location within the state of Minnesota Laketown (the United States)
- Coordinates: 44°50′38″N 93°42′23″W
- Country: United States
- State: Minnesota
- County: Carver

Area
  - Total: 30.4 sq mi (78.7 km^{2})
  - Land: 27.7 sq mi (71.7 km^{2})
  - Water: 2.7 sq mi (7.0 km^{2})
- Elevation: 974 ft (297 m)

Population (2020)
  - Total: 1,966
- Time zone: UTC-6 (Central (CST))
  - Summer (DST): UTC-5 (CDT)
- FIPS code: 27-35108
- GNIS feature ID: 0664705

Laketown Township is a township in Carver County, Minnesota, United States. The population was 1,966 as of the 2020 census.

== History ==
Laketown Township organized in 1858, and was named for its numerous small lakes.

== Geography ==
According to the United States Census Bureau, the township has a total area of 30.4 square miles (79 km^{2}), of which 27.7 square miles (72 km^{2}) is land and 2.7 square miles (7.0 km^{2}) (8.89%) is water.

The west edge of the city of Chaska and the west half of the city of Victoria are located within the township geographically but are separate entities.

Township 116 North, Range 24 West, Fifth Principal Meridian of the Public Land Survey System.

=== Lakes ===
- Lake Auburn (west quarter)
- Lake Waconia (east quarter)
- Lunstein Lake
- Marsh Lake
- Mud Lake
- Parley Lake
- Piersons Lake
- Reitz Lake
- Turbid Lake
- Wasserman Lake (west three-quarters)
- Lake Bavaria (southern half)

=== Adjacent townships ===
- Dahlgren Township (south)
- Benton Township (southwest)
- Waconia Township (west)
- Watertown Township (northwest)

=== Unincorporated community ===
- Coney Island

=== Major highway ===
- Minnesota State Highway 5

=== Cemeteries ===
The township contains Scandia Cemetery.

== Demographics ==
Historical population
Census	Pop.	Note	%±
1860	648		—
1870	1,039		60.3%
1880	1,056		1.6%
1890	1,007		−4.6%
1900	1,109		10.1%
1910	1,180		6.4%
1920	952		−19.3%
1930	985		3.5%
1940	990		0.5%
1950	966		−2.4%
1960	1,036		7.2%
1970	1,750		68.9%
1980	2,424		38.5%
1990	2,232		−7.9%
2000	2,331		4.4%
2010	2,243		−3.8%
2020	1,966		−12.3%
U.S. Decennial Census

As of the census of 2000, there were 2,331 people, 637 households, and 545 families residing in the township. The population density was 84.2 inhabitants per square mile (32.5/km^{2}). There were 665 housing units at an average density of 24.0/sq mi (9.3/km^{2}). The racial makeup of the township was 96.48% White, 0.64% African American, 0.09% Native American, 1.80% Asian, 0.26% Pacific Islander, 0.09% from other races, and 0.64% from two or more races. Hispanic or Latino of any race were 0.90% of the population.

There were 637 households, out of which 42.4% had children under the age of 18 living with them, 80.7% were married couples living together, 2.4% had a female householder with no husband present, and 14.4% were non-families. 11.1% of all households were made up of individuals, and 3.9% had someone living alone who was 65 years of age or older. The average household size was 2.92 and the average family size was 3.17.

In the township the population was spread out, with 23.2% under the age of 18, 21.4% from 18 to 24, 24.9% from 25 to 44, 24.3% from 45 to 64, and 6.3% who were 65 years of age or older. The median age was 32 years. For every 100 females, there were 100.3 males. For every 100 females age 18 and over, there were 100.6 males.

The median income for a household in the township was $75,000, and the median income for a family was $78,577. Males had a median income of $50,349 versus $29,167 for females. The per capita income for the township was $27,543. About 1.5% of families and 1.8% of the population were below the poverty line, including none of those under age 18 and 3.5% of those age 65 or over.

United States presidential election results for Laketown Township, Minnesota
Year	Republican		Democratic		Third party(ies)	
Year	No.	%	No.	%	No.	%
1960	269	52.95%	235	46.26%	4	0.79%
1964	254	46.61%	291	53.39%	0	0.00%
1968	381	57.04%	242	36.23%	45	6.74%
1972	617	66.20%	279	29.94%	36	3.86%
1976	614	57.65%	421	39.53%	30	2.82%
1980	775	64.05%	318	26.28%	117	9.67%
1984	782	76.37%	242	23.63%	0	0.00%
1988	722	70.17%	307	29.83%	0	0.00%
1992	524	46.54%	305	27.09%	297	26.38%
1996	663	57.50%	358	31.05%	132	11.45%
2000	940	68.86%	336	24.62%	89	6.52%
2004	918	69.81%	382	29.05%	15	1.14%
2008	922	68.45%	407	30.22%	18	1.34%
2012	886	68.52%	382	29.54%	25	1.93%
2016	710	61.47%	322	27.88%	123	10.65%
2020	763	63.53%	407	33.89%	31	2.58%
2024	773	63.78%	416	34.32%	23	1.90%

== Education ==
Much of the township is in the Waconia Public School District while a portion is in the Eastern Carver County Public Schools school district.

Crown College is in the township.
