= Watertown Township, Carver County, Minnesota =

Township in Minnesota, United States

Watertown
- Township
- Location within the state of Minnesota Watertown (the United States)
- Coordinates: 44°56′46″N 93°49′14″W
- Country: United States
- State: Minnesota
- County: Carver

Area
  - Total: 34.5 sq mi (89.3 km^{2})
  - Land: 32.5 sq mi (84.3 km^{2})
  - Water: 1.9 sq mi (5.0 km^{2})
- Elevation: 968 ft (295 m)

Population (2020)
  - Total: 1,188
- Time zone: UTC-6 (Central (CST))
  - Summer (DST): UTC-5 (CDT)
- ZIP code: 55388
- Area code: 952
- FIPS code: 27-68566
- GNIS feature ID: 0665931
- Website: https://watertowntwpcarvercomn.gov/

Watertown Township is a rural township in Carver County, Minnesota, United States. The population was 1,188 as of the 2020 census.

== History ==
Watertown Township was organized in 1858, and named from the numerous bodies of water within its borders.

== Geography ==
According to the United States Census Bureau, the township has a total area of 34.5 square miles (89.3 km^{2}), of which 32.5 square miles (84.3 km^{2}) is land and 1.9 square miles (5.0 km^{2}) (5.62%) is water.

The entire city of Watertown and a portion of the city of Mayer are located within the township geographically but are separate entities.

Township 117 North, Range 25 West, Fifth Principal Meridian of the Public Land Survey System.

=== Lakes ===
- Buck Lake
- Goose Lake (north quarter)
- Lippert Lake (east quarter)
- Mud Lake
- Oak Lake
- Rice Lake
- Swede Lake

=== Adjacent townships ===
- Franklin Township, Wright County (north)
- Laketown Township (southeast)
- Waconia Township (south)
- Hollywood Township (west)
- Woodland Township, Wright County (northwest)

=== Cemeteries ===
The township contains the following cemeteries: Saint Paul's Catholic and Zion.

=== Major highways ===
- Minnesota State Highway 7
- Minnesota State Highway 25

== Demographics ==
Historical population
Census	Pop.	Note	%±
1860	437		—
1870	1,241		184.0%
1880	1,032		−16.8%
1890	1,102		6.8%
1900	1,161		5.4%
1910	1,267		9.1%
1920	1,191		−6.0%
1930	1,125		−5.5%
1940	1,052		−6.5%
1950	1,040		−1.1%
1960	1,075		3.4%
1970	1,348		25.4%
1980	1,429		6.0%
1990	1,349		−5.6%
2000	1,432		6.2%
2010	1,204		−15.9%
2020	1,188		−1.3%
U.S. Decennial Census

As of the census of 2000, there were 1,432 people, 478 households, and 393 families residing in the township. The population density was 44.0 inhabitants per square mile (17.0/km^{2}). There were 485 housing units at an average density of 14.9/sq mi (5.8/km^{2}). The racial makeup of the township was 98.88% White, 0.28% African American, 0.21% Native American, 0.56% Asian, and 0.07% from two or more races. Hispanic or Latino of any race were 0.56% of the population.

There were 478 households, out of which 38.9% had children under the age of 18 living with them, 74.1% were married couples living together, 3.8% had a female householder with no husband present, and 17.6% were non-families. 14.2% of all households were made up of individuals, and 4.4% had someone living alone who was 65 years of age or older. The average household size was 2.88 and the average family size was 3.22.

In the township the population was spread out, with 27.1% under the age of 18, 7.1% from 18 to 24, 29.3% from 25 to 44, 27.7% from 45 to 64, and 8.9% who were 65 years of age or older. The median age was 38 years. For every 100 females, there were 101.7 males. For every 100 females age 18 and over, there were 103.5 males.

The median income for a household in the township was $61,083, and the median income for a family was $67,679. Males had a median income of $42,250 versus $30,724 for females. The per capita income for the township was $24,005. About 3.4% of families and 6.2% of the population were below the poverty line, including 4.1% of those under age 18 and 13.8% of those age 65 or over.

== Politics ==
Presidential election results

Precinct General Election Results
Year	Republican	Democratic	Third parties
2020	67.9% 583	30.8% 265	1.3% 11
2016	66.9% 522	26.8% 209	6.3% 49
2012	64.0% 501	34.4% 269	1.6% 13
2008	60.9% 485	36.8% 293	2.3% 18
2004	63.4% 524	34.9% 288	1.7% 14
2000	60.3% 480	32.3% 257	7.4% 59
1996	44.3% 302	39.0% 266	16.7% 114
1992	34.0% 240	35.6% 251	30.4% 214
1988	56.4% 354	43.6% 274	0.0% 0
1984	58.8% 371	41.2% 260	0.0% 0
1980	54.6% 364	36.9% 246	8.5% 57
1976	43.2% 267	51.5% 318	5.3% 33
1968	53.1% 257	43.2% 209	3.7% 18
1964	49.4% 201	50.6% 206	0.0% 0
1960	66.0% 274	33.7% 140	0.2% 1
