= Minnesota State Highway 41 =

State highway in Minnesota, United States

Trunk Highway 41
- MN 41 highlighted in red

Route information
- Maintained by MnDOT
- Length: 9.382 mi (15.099 km)
- Existed: 1933–present

Major junctions
- South end: US 169 / CSAH 78 at Jackson Township
- US 212 at Chaska; MN 5 at Chanhassen
- North end: MN 7 at Shorewood

Location
- Country: United States
- State: Minnesota
- Counties: Scott, Carver, Hennepin

Highway system
- Minnesota Trunk Highway System; Interstate; US; State; Legislative; Scenic
← MN 40	→ MN 42

Minnesota State Highway 41 (MN 41) is a 9.382-mile-long (15.099 km) highway in Minnesota, which runs from its intersection with U.S. Highway 169 in Jackson Township near Shakopee and continues north to its northern terminus at its intersection with State Highway 7 in Shorewood.

== Route description ==
Highway 41 is 9 miles (14 km) in length and serves as a north–south arterial route between the communities of Chaska and Chanhassen.

The route crosses the Minnesota River between Jackson Township and Chaska.

41 is also known as Chestnut Street in Chaska and Hazeltine Boulevard in Chanhassen.

Highway 41 has an intersection with Chaska Boulevard (Old Highway 212) in downtown Chaska.

41 has an interchange with the U.S. 212 freeway in Chaska.

The Minnesota Landscape Arboretum is located immediately west of the junction of Highway 41 and Highway 5 in Chanhassen / Chaska. The Arboretum entrance is located on Highway 5.

== History ==
Highway 41 was posted in 1934 between U.S. 212 at Chaska and State Highway 7 at Shorewood.

The section of Highway 41 between U.S. 169 at Jackson Township and U.S. 212 at Chaska was authorized in 1950.

The original section of Highway 41 between U.S. 212 and Highway 7 was paved by 1940.

The original Minnesota River bridge between Jackson Township and Chaska opened in 1960. A new four-lane bridge was completed in 2007.

== Major intersections ==
County	Location	mi	km	Destinations	Notes
Scott	Jackson Township	0.000	0.000	US 169 / CSAH 78	Diverging diamond interchange
Minnesota River		1.497– 1.597	2.409– 2.570	Chaska Bridge	
Carver	Chaska	2.026	3.261	CSAH 61	Formerly US 212
Carver	Chaska	3.113	5.010	CSAH 10 (Engler Boulevard)	
Carver	Chaska	3.778– 3.876	6.080– 6.238	US 212	Interchange
Carver	Chaska	4.737	7.623	CSAH 14 (Pioneer Trail)	
Carver	Chaska	6.230	10.026	CSAH 18 (Lyman Boulevard)	Roundabout
Carver	Chanhassen	7.215	11.611	MN 5 (Arboretum Boulevard) – Victoria, I-494	
Hennepin	Shorewood	9.362	15.067	MN 7 – Hutchinson, Minneapolis	
1.000 mi = 1.609 km; 1.000 km = 0.621 mi
