= Minnesota State Highway 5 =

Highway in Minnesota

Trunk Highway 5
- Fort Road
- MN 5 highlighted in red

Route information
- Maintained by MnDOT
- Length: 76.347 mi (122.869 km)
- Existed: 1934–present

Major junctions
- West end: MN 19 / MN 22 at Gaylord
- US 212 at Norwood Young America; MN 41 at Chanhassen; MN 101 at Chanhassen; I-494 / US 212 at Eden Prairie; I-35W at Bloomington; I-494 at Bloomington; MN 55 / MN 62 at Fort Snelling; I-35E at St. Paul; I-94 / US 12 / US 52 at St. Paul; US 61 at St. Paul
- East end: MN 120 / CSAH 6 at Maplewood–Oakdale

Location
- Country: United States
- State: Minnesota
- Counties: Sibley, Carver, Hennepin, Ramsey

Highway system
- Minnesota Trunk Highway System; Interstate; US; State; Legislative; Scenic
← MN 4	→ MN 6

Minnesota State Highway 5 (MN 5) is a 76.347-mile-long (122.869 km) highway in Minnesota, which runs from its intersection with MN 19 and MN 22 in Gaylord and continues east and northeast to its eastern terminus at its intersection with MN 120 in Maplewood. The route passes through downtown Saint Paul.

== Route description ==
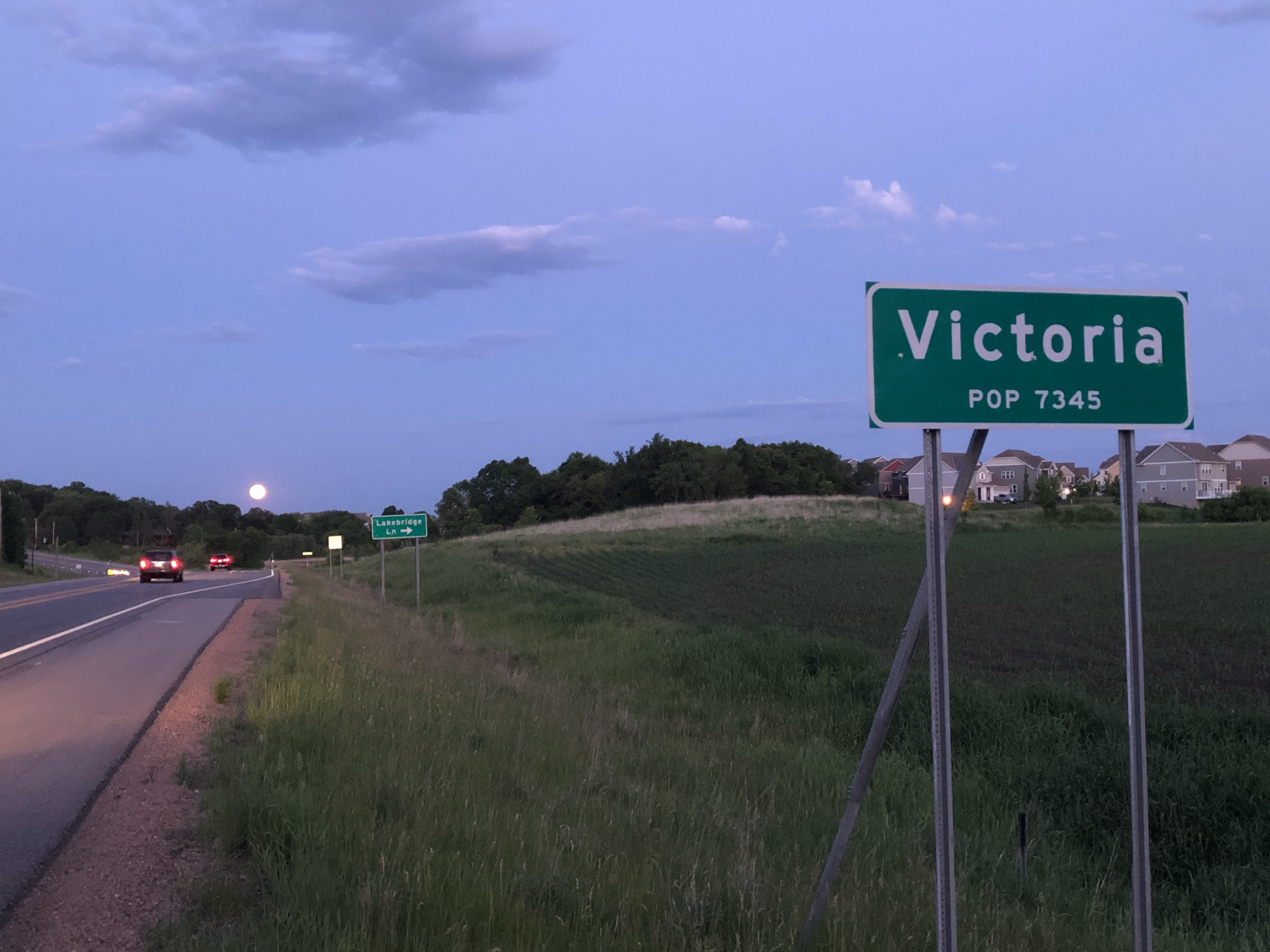
Looking east on MN 5 into Victoria

MN 5 serves as a northeast–southwest route between Gaylord, Norwood Young America, Chanhassen, Eden Prairie, Bloomington, Richfield, downtown Saint Paul, and Maplewood. The state highway runs though five counties. The highway is officially marked as an east–west route by its highway markers from beginning to end.

Part of MN 5 is designed as a freeway near the Minneapolis–Saint Paul International Airport. Just to the west of that segment, MN 5 runs concurrently with Interstate 494 (I-494) for 11 miles (18 km) between its junction with I-494 near the airport and the Minnesota River to its junction with I-494 and U.S. Highway 212 (US 212) in Eden Prairie.

MN 5 is considered a significant transit corridor, known as the Riverview Corridor, to downtown Saint Paul from the airport and points farther south and west. There has been discussion of creating a bus rapid transit or light rail line along the highway, much like the METRO Blue Line currently runs rails into downtown Minneapolis along MN 55.

MN 5 is also known as Fort Road and West 7th Street in the city of St. Paul.

About 45 miles (72 km) of MN 5 is officially designated the Augie Mueller Memorial Highway, named for August B. Mueller. This designation is signed from its intersection with MN 101 in Chanhassen southwesterly to its intersection with MN 19 in Gaylord.

Legally, MN 5 is defined as legislative routes 45, 52, 102, 109, 111, and 121 in the Minnesota Statutes. The route is not marked with those numbers.

== History ==
MN 5 was authorized in 1934. The route was completely paved by 1953.

When MN 5 was slated for expansion in 1956, the construction threatened to demolish the remains of historic Fort Snelling, near the confluence of the Mississippi and Minnesota rivers. As a result of public outcry, the highway was built in a short tunnel underneath the Fort Snelling site, sparing the fort from destruction. This effort led to archaeological research into the remains of Fort Snelling and its eventual rebuilding as a state park.

From 1934 to 1982, the eastern section of the highway between Saint Paul and Stillwater was originally marked as MN 212, as it once reached old US 212 in Saint Paul, but that segment was re-numbered as an extension of MN 5 c. 1983. This segment is still marked with the mileposts from MN 212, which were a continuation of those from US 212.

Along the concurrency with I-494, the MN 5 marker is placed at most, but not all, interchanges. In 2007, new gore signs placed on France Avenue in Bloomington at its interchange with I-494 do not mention the MN 5 concurrency, whereas the older signs they replaced did. The more recent interchange with Lyndale Avenue (2009) displays the names of both highways.

In June 2015, it was announced that MN 5 will be shortened by 8.3 miles (13.4 km) by the state of Minnesota, giving the portion from MN 120 to its eastern conterminous at MN 36 to Washington County. The road is known as 34th Street between Jamaca Avenue and MN 120 and Stillwater Boulevard between Jamaca Avenue and MN 36. The road is an extension of County Road 14 (CR 14) and CR 15. This road is designated from the county line to Manning Avenue as CR 14 and from Manning Avenue to MN 36 as CR 15. This piece of the highway that will be returned to the county was originally marked as MN 212. This portion of highway is now marked with county highway signs as well as Old Highway 5 signs.

In May 2023, a seven-mile (11 km) section of MN 5 in the vicinity of Chanhassen was designated the Prince Rogers Nelson Memorial Highway in honor of musician Prince, whose Paisley Park Studios are located along the route.

== Major intersections ==
All exits are unnumbered except for the I-494 concurrency.

County	Location	mi	km	Destinations	Notes
Sibley	Gaylord	0.000	0.000	MN 19 west / MN 22 north – Winthrop, Glencoe	Western western end of MN 19/MN 22 concurrency
Sibley	Gaylord	0.141	0.227	MN 22 south – St. Peter	Eastern end of MN 22 concurrency
Sibley	Gaylord	1.350	2.173	MN 19 east – Henderson	Eastern end of MN 19 concurrency
Sibley	Green Isle	14.400	23.175	MN 25 south (McGrann Street) – Belle Plaine	Southern end of MN 25 concurrency
Carver	Young America Township	21.055	33.885	US 212 west / CR 131 – Glencoe	Western end of US 212 concurrency
Carver	Norwood Young America	23.610	37.997	US 212 east / CSAH 33 – Chaska	Eastern end of US 212 concurrency
Carver	Young America Township	26.242	42.232	MN 25 north – Watertown	Northern end of MN 25 concurrency
Carver	Waconia	32.167	51.768	MN 284 south (Olive Street) – Cologne	
Carver	Chanhassen	42.422	68.272	MN 41 (Hazeltine Boulevard) – Excelsior, Chaska	
Carver	Chanhassen	45.486	73.203	CSAH 101 (Market Boulevard)	Former MN 101 south
Carver	Chanhassen	46.132	74.242	MN 101 north / Dakota Avenue	
Hennepin	Eden Prairie	48.954	78.784	US 212 west	Western end of US 212 concurrency; western end of freeway section
Hennepin	Eden Prairie			CSAH 60 (Mitchell Road)	
Hennepin	Eden Prairie			Prairie Center Drive	
Hennepin	Eden Prairie	50.779	81.721	I-494 north / US 212 east	Eastern end of US 212 concurrency; western end of I-494 concurrency; I-494 exits 11B-C
Hennepin	See I-494				
Hennepin	Unorganized Territory of Fort Snelling	61.184– 61.930	98.466– 99.667	I-494 east / 34th Avenue – Terminal 2	Eastern end of I-494 concurrency; 34th Avenue and Terminal 2 not signed eastbound; I-494 exit 1A
Hennepin	Unorganized Territory of Fort Snelling			Post Road	
Hennepin	Unorganized Territory of Fort Snelling			Terminal 1	
Hennepin	Unorganized Territory of Fort Snelling	64.053	103.083	MN 55 / MN 62 – Hastings, Minneapolis, Fort Snelling Historic Site	Exits to MN 55 north include direct exit ramps to Bloomington Road
Mississippi River		64.243– 64.469	103.389– 103.753	Fort Road Bridge	
Ramsey	St. Paul	64.530	103.851	Edgcumbe Road, Shepard Road, Mississippi River Boulevard	Eastbound exit and westbound entrance
Ramsey	St. Paul			Norfolk Avenue	Eastbound exit only; eastern end of freeway
Ramsey	St. Paul	66.353	106.785	MN 51 north (Montreal Avenue)	
Ramsey	St. Paul	66.686	107.321	I-35E	I-35E exit 103B
Ramsey	St. Paul	70.886	114.080	I-94 / US 12 / US 52 west	I-94 east exit 241B
Ramsey	St. Paul	70.905	114.111	US 52 south (Lafayette Freeway)	Interchange
Ramsey	St. Paul	71.349	114.825	US 61 south	Western end of US 61 concurrency
Ramsey	St. Paul	71.939	115.775	US 61 north (Arcade Street)	Eastern end of US 61 concurrency
Ramsey	Maplewood	76.347	122.869	MN 120 (Century Avenue) / CSAH 6 east (Stillwater Boulevard)	Eastern terminus; road continues into Washington County as CSAH 6 (Stillwater Boulevard)
1.000 mi = 1.609 km; 1.000 km = 0.621 mi: Concurrency terminus; Incomplete access
