= Minnesota State Highway 284 =

State highway in Minnesota, United States

Trunk Highway 284
- MN 284 highlighted in red

Route information
- Maintained by MnDOT
- Length: 5.651 mi (9.094 km)
- Existed: July 1, 1949–present

Major junctions
- South end: US 212 at Cologne
- North end: MN 5 at Waconia

Location
- Country: United States
- State: Minnesota
- Counties: Carver

Highway system
- Minnesota Trunk Highway System; Interstate; US; State; Legislative; Scenic
← MN 282	→ MN 286

Minnesota State Highway 284 (MN 284) is a 5.651-mile-long (9.094 km) highway in Minnesota, which runs from its intersection with U.S. Highway 212 in Cologne and continues to its northern terminus at its intersection with State Highway 5 in Waconia.

== Route description ==
Highway 284 serves as a north–south route between Cologne and Waconia.

The roadway is also known as Paul Avenue and Benton Street in the city of Cologne.

The route passes around the east side of Benton Lake in Cologne.

The route is legally defined as Route 284 in the Minnesota Statutes.

== History ==
Highway 284 was authorized on July 1, 1949.

The route was paved at the time it was marked.

== Major intersections ==
The entire route is in Carver County.

Location	mi	km	Destinations	Notes
Cologne	0.000	0.000	US 212 – Chaska, Norwood Young America	Superstreet intersection
Waconia	5.651	9.094	MN 5 – Victoria, Norwood Young America CSAH 57 north	Roadway continues as CSAH 57
1.000 mi = 1.609 km; 1.000 km = 0.621 mi
