= U.S. Route 212 in Minnesota =

Section of U.S. Highway in Minnesota, United States

U.S. Highway 212
- Minnesota Veterans Memorial Highway; Yellowstone Trail
- US 212 highlighted in red

Route information
- Maintained by MnDOT
- Length: 161.787 mi (260.371 km)
- Existed: 1926–present
- Tourist routes: Minnesota River Valley Scenic Byway

Major junctions
- West end: US 212 at South Dakota state line
- US 59 at Montevideo; MN 23 / MN 67 at Granite Falls; US 71 at Olivia; MN 22 at Glencoe; MN 5 at Norwood Young America; MN 41 at Chaska; I-494 / MN 5 at Eden Prairie
- East end: US 169 / MN 62 at Edina

Location
- Country: United States
- State: Minnesota
- Counties: Lac qui Parle, Chippewa, Yellow Medicine, Renville, McLeod, Carver, Hennepin

Highway system
- United States Numbered Highway System; List; Special; Divided; Minnesota Trunk Highway System; Interstate; US; State; Legislative; Scenic
← MN 210	→ MN 217

U.S. Highway 212 (US 212) within the state of Minnesota travels from the South Dakota state line in the west, crosses the southwestern part of the state, to the Minneapolis–Saint Paul metropolitan area in the east and end at its interchange with US 169 and State Highway 62 (MN 62) in the Minneapolis suburb of Edina. US 212 in Minnesota has an official length of 161.8 miles (260.4 km). It is an urban freeway within the Minneapolis–Saint Paul area and is mostly a two-lane rural road elsewhere in the state.

Prior to the establishment of the United States Numbered Highway System, most of the US 212 corridor in Minnesota was part the transcontinental auto trail known as the Yellowstone Trail, which was established in 1917. US 212 was established in 1926 but originally terminated at US 12 in the city of Willmar from 1926 to 1934. US 212 was shifted to its current alignment around 1934, continuing slightly east of its current terminus to end at then US 12 in Saint Paul until 1982, when US 212 was truncated to Edina. In 2008, the Twin Cities portion of US 212 was relocated to a new freeway (formerly designated as State Highway 312 from 2003 to 2008).

== Route description ==
US 212 in Minnesota passes through seven counties in the southern part of the state, from the South Dakota state line to the Twin Cities area. It runs in straight east–west course from the South Dakota line across prairie land to the city of Montevideo. From there the route follows the valley of the Minnesota River to Granite Falls. It then leaves the Minnesota River valley to pass through farming areas until Glencoe, where the terrain gradually becomes more hilly as the road continues east. As the route approaches the Twin Cities, the road becomes a freeway running parallel to, but not within, the Minnesota River valley. US 212 ends at the junction of US 169 and MN 62 in the Minneapolis suburb of Edina.

The entire length of US 212 in Minnesota is officially designated the Minnesota Veterans Memorial Highway. Legally, the Minnesota section of US 212 is defined as Legislative Routes 155, 12, 187, and 260 in the Minnesota Statutes. The route is not marked with those numbers.

=== South Dakota to Granite Falls ===
US 212 crosses into Minnesota from South Dakota, traveling through flat, open terrain. About 12 miles (19 km) from the state line, it intersects US 75, then enters the small city of Dawson several miles later. US 212 continues past Dawson through more fertile prairie land, eventually being joined by US 59. The overlapped routes pass by the entrance to Camp Release State Park, a 14-acre (57,000 m^{2}) park where the former Sioux village of Chief Red Iron was located, and which also contains a 51-foot (16 m) granite monument commemorating the release of 269 prisoners from Sioux captivity. US 212 and US 59 split in the western edge of the city of Montevideo in the valley of the Minnesota River; US 59 heads northwest, and US 212 heads southeast. US 212 follows the Minnesota valley for about 13 miles (21 km) to the city of Granite Falls. In the center of the city, MN 23 joins US 212 briefly as they cross the Minnesota River; the two routes split soon after leaving the eastern city limits.

=== Granite Falls to Glencoe ===
East of Granite Falls, US 212 leaves the Minnesota River valley, heading due east across a variety of farming areas in the south central portion of the state. For the next 28 miles (45 km), US 212 passes through a series of small cities in this area: Sacred Heart, Renville, Danube, and Olivia. In Olivia, the county seat of Renville County, US 212 meets US 71. US 212 continues due east through more farmland, again passing through a series of small cities that developed along the route. Through the next 30 miles (48 km) of the road, US 212 goes through Bird Island, Hector (intersecting MN 4), Buffalo Lake, Stewart and Brownton (intersecting MN 15). Brownton, which is located on Buffalo Creek, is the site of the Sioux Uprising, one of the earliest massacres of white settlers in the region. Several miles later, US 212 is joined by MN 22; US 212 becomes a four-lane divided highway heading east into the city of Glencoe closely following Buffalo Creek. MN 22 splits off to the north in downtown Glencoe, while US 212 heads east out of the city.

=== Glencoe to the Twin Cities area ===
East of Glencoe, the terrain becomes progressively more hilly as US 212 continues eastward. US 212 is joined by MN 5 and MN 25 about eight miles (13 km) after leaving Glencoe. The three overlapped routes continue east into the city of Norwood Young America for about two miles (3.2 km), after which MN 5 and MN 25 split off to the north in the center of the city. After leaving Norwood Young America, US 212 becomes a two-lane road, passing by several lakes, continuing east for several miles to the city of Cologne. It then runs into the community of Dahlgren. East of Dahlgren, US 212 becomes a freeway as it heads into the Twin Cities area. The freeway runs along the northwest upland of the Minnesota River valley.

After the first interchange on the freeway with Jonathan Carver Parkway, US 212 enters the city limits of Chaska. The road then curves to the north. It has an interchange with Big Woods Boulevard that was constructed in late 2019. It crosses over Chaska Creek, and has an interchange with Engler Boulevard before turning northeastward. The freeway meets with MN 41. Less than two miles (3.2 km) later, the freeway enters the city of Chanhassen, where it has two interchanges and passes by several lakes. US 212 then crosses into Hennepin County and into the city of Eden Prairie. US 212 is joined by MN 5 in Eden Prairie for about 1.5 miles (2.4 km) as they travel eastward. The overlap with MN 5 ends at the cloverleaf interchange with Interstate 494 (I-494). At the boundary between Eden Prairie and Edina, US 212 parallels MN 62, and the two highways have a junction with US 169. US 212 officially ends at the eastern limit of this interchange in Edina, where eastbound US 212 merges into eastbound MN 62. MN 62 continues the roadway into the city of Minneapolis.

== History ==
=== Auto trails ===
Yellowstone Trail marker

Most of the route of present-day US 212 between Montevideo and Norwood Young America was originally designated as part of the transcontinental auto trail known as the Yellowstone Trail, which was conceived in 1912. The Yellowstone Trail stretched from Seattle, Washington, via Yellowstone National Park, to Plymouth, Massachusetts. The auto trail route in Minnesota was officially recognized by the Minnesota Highway Department in 1917. East of Norwood Young America, the Yellowstone Trail utilized MN 5, shifting to Excelsior Boulevard via the Minnewashta Parkway to reach Minneapolis. West of Montevideo, the Yellowstone Trail used present day MN 7 to US 12.

The westernmost section of present-day US 212, from the South Dakota line to Montevideo, was also part of another auto trail known as the Short Cut West Highway. This auto trail went on a direct route between Minneapolis and Yellowstone National Park. The Yellowstone Trail also connects Minneapolis with Yellowstone National Park but travels a longer, more circuitous route through many populated centers. Between Montevideo and the Twin Cities area, the Short Cut West Highway ran along MN 7 until Lake Minnewashta, where it ended at the Yellowstone Trail.

=== Designation as a U.S. Highway ===
In 1926, the United States Numbered Highway System was implemented in the country. US 212 was originally designated as a route that connected US 85 in Belle Fourche, South Dakota, with US 12 in Willmar, Minnesota. In 1934, US 212 was extended east to Saint Paul along mostly its modern alignment. In the Twin Cities area, US 212 utilized Flying Cloud Drive and Vernon Avenue to reach Excelsior Boulevard. It then followed Lake Street through Minneapolis, crossing the Mississippi River into Saint Paul and becoming Marshall Avenue and finally ending at then US 12 in downtown Saint Paul. In 1983, US 212 was truncated to end at US 169 in Edina, disconnecting US 212 from US 12, its parent route.

=== Construction ===
The paving of US 212 in Minnesota began in 1928 and the route was completely paved by 1940. The earliest sections to be paved were the roads east of MN 15, which was paved by 1929. The portion of the route in Renville County was paved by 1931, while the portion between US 75 and Granite Falls was paved between 1932 and 1934. The portion west of US 75 had originally been a county road and was only added to the state highway system in 1934. Paving of this section was finished in 1938. The portion that overlapped MN 5 was paved by 1940.

Over the next few decades, several sections of the road were reconstructed as four-lane divided highways. The four-lane road between Glencoe and Norwood Young America was completed in 1959. The expressway approach in the vicinity of I-494 was completed by 1971. Several other segments were reconstructed in 1990, namely the old Flying Cloud Drive alignment, which became a four-lane divided surface arterial, and the MN 5 overlap, which became an expressway.

The section of the route between Glencoe and Chaska currently alternates between a 65-mile-per-hour (105 km/h), four-lane expressway and a 60-mile-per-hour (97 km/h) two-lane roadway. A four-way stop sign in Glencoe is located within the 55-mile-per-hour (89 km/h) expressway segment of the route. Counties and cities along US 212 are lobbying to extend the four-lane divided highway west of Glencoe. The Minnesota Department of Transportation (MnDOT) is considering the proposal.

From Hector to MN 22 near Glencoe, the route is planned to be reconstructed with passing lanes.

=== MN 312 ===
Trunk Highway 312
- Location: Chaska to Eden Prairie
- Length: 6 mi (9.7 km)
- Existed: 2001–2008

Between Eden Prairie and Chaska, US 212 was relocated in July 2008 to a new, more northerly, 12-mile (19 km) freeway alignment. During planning and construction, the new freeway was given the temporary designation of MN 312.

On April 29, 2002, former U.S. Transportation Secretary Norman Mineta was in the Twin Cities for an announcement regarding transportation in Minnesota. Mineta presented a $2.9 million check (Federal Highway Administration grant) to state transportation officials. The $2.9 million is part of the $238 million funding for the new 12-mile (19 km) freeway alignment of US 212 in Eden Prairie, Chanhassen, and Chaska. The groundbreaking celebration on August 20, 2005, was held in Chaska.

On December 7, 2007, a six-mile (9.7 km) portion of the project from Dell Road in Eden Prairie to MN 41 in Chaska opened to traffic, giving drivers use of about half of the new freeway alignment. It was signed using its temporary designation of MN 312. On July 14, 2008, the remaining portion of the project from MN 41 to just west of Carver opened to traffic. The new freeway has a designated shoulder on both sides for a planned bus rapid transit route extending from Carver to points eastward along the freeway.

Soon after the completion of MN 312, the MN 312 route designation was retired and US 212 was relocated onto the new freeway. The former surface alignment of US 212 along Flying Cloud Drive was turned back to the maintenance of Carver and Hennepin counties as County Road 61.

== Major intersections ==
County	Location	mi	km	Exit	Destinations	Notes	
Lac qui Parle	Mehurin Township	0.000	0.000		US 212 west – Watertown	Continuation into South Dakota	
Lac qui Parle	Hamlin Township	12.545	20.189		US 75 – Madison, Canby		
Lac qui Parle	Dawson	19.070	30.690		MN 119		
Lac qui Parle	Baxter Township	26.060	41.940		CSAH 29 / CSAH 31 – Boyd, Lac qui Parle State Park	Formerly MN 275	
Lac qui Parle	Camp Release Township	32.083	51.633		US 59 south – Clarkfield, Marshall	Western end of US 59 concurrency	
Chippewa	Montevideo	35.733	57.507		US 59 north / MN 29 north to MN 7 / Minnesota River Valley Scenic Byway – Appleton, Benson	Southern terminus of MN 29, eastern end of US 59 concurrency	
Yellow Medicine	Stony Run Township	47.871	77.041		MN 67 west – Clarkfield	Western end of MN 67 concurrency	
Yellow Medicine	Granite Falls	49.062	78.958		MN 23 west / MN 67 east – Marshall, Redwood Falls	Western end of MN 23 concurrency, eastern end of MN 67 concurrency	
Chippewa	Granite Falls Township	50.469	81.222		CR 40 / Minnesota River Valley Scenic Byway		
Chippewa–Renville county line	Granite Falls–Hawk Creek township line	52.284	84.143		MN 23 east – Clara City, Willmar	Eastern end of MN 23 concurrency	
Renville	Olivia	74.611	120.075		US 71 north – Willmar	Western end of US 71 concurrency	
Renville	Olivia	76.680	123.404		US 71 south – Redwood Falls	Eastern end of US 71 concurrency	
Renville	Hector	90.926	146.331		MN 4 – Cosmos, Fairfax		
McLeod	Sumter Township	108.076	173.931		MN 15 – Hutchinson, New Ulm		
McLeod	Glencoe Township	116.286	187.144		MN 22 south – Gaylord	Western end of MN 22 concurrency	
McLeod	Glencoe	119.481	192.286		MN 22 north – Hutchinson	Eastern end of MN 22 concurrency	
McLeod	Helen Township	122.863	197.729		CSAH 1 – Lester Prairie, Arlington	Formerly MN 261	
Carver	Young America Township	128.320	206.511		MN 5 west / MN 25 south / CR 131 north – Green Isle, Gaylord	Western end of MN 5/MN 25 concurrency	
Carver	Norwood Young America	130.627	210.224		MN 5 east / MN 25 north / CSAH 33 – Waconia	Eastern end of MN 5/MN 25 concurrency	
Carver	Cologne	138.296	222.566		MN 284 north / CSAH 53 – Cologne	Southern terminus of MN 284	
Carver		145.000	233.355	Western end of freeway			
Carver	Carver	145.210	233.693	—	CSAH 11 (Jonathan Carver Parkway)		
Carver	Carver	Chaska			—	CSAH 44 (Big Woods Boulevard)	Westbound exit and eastbound entrance, interchange completed late 2019
Carver	Carver	147.570	237.491	—	CSAH 10 (Engler Boulevard)		
Carver	Carver	148.921	239.665	—	MN 41 (Chestnut Street)		
Carver	Chanhassen	151.832	244.350	—	CSAH 17 (Powers Boulevard)		
Carver	Chanhassen	152.801	245.909	—	CSAH 101	Former MN 101 (commissioned until 2013)	
Hennepin	Eden Prairie	154.531	248.694	—	Dell Road		
Hennepin	Eden Prairie	155.474	250.211	—	CSAH 4 (Eden Prairie Road)		
Hennepin	Eden Prairie	156.613	252.044	—	Wallace Road	Eastbound exit and westbound entrance	
Hennepin	Eden Prairie	157.142	252.896	—	MN 5 west (Arboretum Boulevard)	Western end of MN 5 concurrency; westbound exit and eastbound entrance	
Hennepin	Eden Prairie			—	CSAH 60 (Mitchell Road)	Westbound exit and eastbound entrance	
Hennepin	Eden Prairie	157.955	254.204	—	Prairie Center Drive		
Hennepin	Eden Prairie	158.674	255.361	159A	I-494 / MN 5 east	Eastern end of MN 5 concurrency; I-494 exits 11B-C	
Hennepin	Eden Prairie	158.674	255.361	159B	I-494 north	I-494 exits 11B-C	
Hennepin	Eden Prairie	159.174	256.166	160	CSAH 39 west (Valley View Road) / CSAH 61 south	Western end of CSAH 61 concurrency	
Hennepin	Eden Prairie	160.334	258.033	161	CSAH 61 north (Shady Oak Road)	Eastern end of CSAH 61 concurrency	
Hennepin	Eden Prairie–Edina line	161.298	259.584	162	US 169 / Gleason Road	Eastbound exit and westbound entrance; access via MN 62	
Hennepin	Edina	161.787	260.371	—	MN 62 east (Crosstown Highway)	National eastern terminus	
1.000 mi = 1.609 km; 1.000 km = 0.621 mi: Concurrency terminus; Incomplete access

U.S. Route 212
Previous state: South Dakota	Minnesota	Next state: Terminus
