= Young America Township, Carver County, Minnesota =

Township in Minnesota, United States

Young America
- Township
- Location within the state of Minnesota
- Coordinates: 44°46′09″N 93°56′49″W
- Country: United States
- State: Minnesota
- County: Carver

Area
  - Total: 34.09 sq mi (88.29 km^{2})
  - Land: 32.78 sq mi (84.91 km^{2})
  - Water: 1.31 sq mi (3.38 km^{2}) 3.83%
- Elevation: 1,020 ft (311 m)

Population (2020)
  - Total: 683
- Time zone: UTC-6 (CST)
  - Summer (DST): UTC-5 (CDT)
- GNIS feature ID: 0666069
- Website: https://www.youngamericatownship.com/

Young America Township is a rural township in Carver County, Minnesota, United States. The population was 683 as of the 2020 census. Although dominated by agriculture, it was also home to a rebate-processing center for the Young America Corporation until 2015.

== Geography ==
According to the United States Census Bureau, the township has a total area of 34.1 square miles (88.3 km^{2}), of which 32.8 square miles (84.9 km^{2}) is land and 1.3 square miles (3.4 km^{2}) (3.81%) is water.

The cities of Norwood Young America and Hamburg are located entirely within the township geographically but are separate entities.

Township 115 North, Range 26 West, Fifth Principal Meridian of the Public Land Survey System.

=== Lakes ===
- Barnes Lake
- Brand Lake
- Braunworth Lake
- Frederick Lake
- Hoefkin Lake (west edge)
- Tiger Lake
- Young American Lake

=== Adjacent townships ===
- Camden Township (north)
- Waconia Township (northeast)
- Benton Township (east)
- Hancock Township (southeast)
- Washington Lake Township, Sibley County (south)
- Green Isle Township, Sibley County (southwest)
- Helen Township, McLeod County (west)

=== Cemeteries ===
The township contains five cemeteries: Emanuel Lutheran Church, Ferguson, Reformed Church, Saint Johns and Saint Paul's Evangelical Reformed Church.

=== Major highways ===
- U.S. Highway 212
- Minnesota State Highway 5
- Minnesota State Highway 25

== Demographics ==
Historical population
| Census | Pop. | Note | %± |
|---|---|---|---|
| 1860 | 305 | | — |
| 1870 | 823 | | 169.8% |
| 1880 | 979 | | 19.0% |
| 1890 | 1,106 | | 13.0% |
| 1900 | 1,202 | | 8.7% |
| 1910 | 1,235 | | 2.7% |
| 1920 | 1,259 | | 1.9% |
| 1930 | 1,279 | | 1.6% |
| 1940 | 1,064 | | −16.8% |
| 1950 | 996 | | −6.4% |
| 1960 | 893 | | −10.3% |
| 1970 | 956 | | 7.1% |
| 1980 | 952 | | −0.4% |
| 1990 | 916 | | −3.8% |
| 2000 | 838 | | −8.5% |
| 2010 | 715 | | −14.7% |
| 2020 | 683 | | −4.5% |
U.S. Decennial Census

As of the census of 2000, there were 838 people, 267 households, and 229 families residing in the township. The population density was 25.6 people per square mile (9.9/km^{2}). There were 271 housing units at an average density of 8.3/sq mi (3.2/km^{2}). The racial makeup of the township was 97.37% White, 0.36% African American, 1.55% Asian, and 0.72% from two or more races. Hispanic or Latino of any race were 1.07% of the population.

There were 267 households, out of which 40.1% had children under the age of 18 living with them, 77.2% were married couples living together, 3.7% had a female householder with no husband present, and 13.9% were non-families. 10.9% of all households were made up of individuals, and 4.9% had someone living alone who was 65 years of age or older. The average household size was 3.09 and the average family size was 3.33.

In the township the population was spread out, with 28.0% under the age of 18, 9.2% from 18 to 24, 28.5% from 25 to 44, 24.8% from 45 to 64, and 9.4% who were 65 years of age or older. The median age was 36 years. For every 100 females, there were 116.5 males. For every 100 females age 18 and over, there were 117.7 males.

The median income for a household in the township was $65,000, and the median income for a family was $70,625. Males had a median income of $37,426 versus $29,792 for females. The per capita income for the township was $23,216. About 2.2% of families and 3.0% of the population were below the poverty line, including 0.5% of those under age 18 and 13.9% of those age 65 or over.

== Politics ==
Presidential election results

Precinct General Election Results
| Year | Republican | Democratic | Third parties |
|---|---|---|---|
| 2020 | 77.3% 364 | 21.7% 102 | 1.0% 5 |
| 2016 | 73.8% 326 | 20.1% 89 | 6.1% 27 |
| 2012 | 73.0% 336 | 25.4% 117 | 1.6% 7 |
| 2008 | 71.4% 327 | 26.4% 121 | 2.2% 10 |
| 2004 | 76.8% 375 | 21.5% 105 | 1.7% 8 |
| 2000 | 69.9% 313 | 22.5% 101 | 7.6% 34 |
| 1996 | 52.0% 209 | 31.8% 128 | 16.2% 65 |
| 1992 | 42.8% 161 | 22.3% 84 | 34.9% 131 |
| 1988 | 72.5% 258 | 27.5% 98 | 0.0% 0 |
| 1984 | 76.9% 296 | 23.1% 89 | 0.0% 0 |
| 1980 | 66.1% 291 | 23.6% 104 | 10.3% 45 |
| 1976 | 62.0% 240 | 33.3% 129 | 4.7% 18 |
| 1968 | 73.5% 321 | 19.9% 87 | 6.6% 29 |
| 1964 | 70.8% 276 | 29.0% 113 | 0.2% 1 |
| 1960 | 78.2% 212 | 21.8% 59 | 0.0% 0 |
