= Hollywood Township, Carver County, Minnesota =

Township in Minnesota, United States

Hollywood
- Township
- Location within the state of Minnesota Hollywood (the United States)
- Coordinates: 44°55′53″N 93°56′44″W
- Country: United States
- State: Minnesota
- County: Carver

Area
  - Total: 36.1 sq mi (93.5 km^{2})
  - Land: 36.0 sq mi (93.2 km^{2})
  - Water: 0.12 sq mi (0.3 km^{2})
- Elevation: 1,001 ft (305 m)

Population (2020)
  - Total: 1,058
- Time zone: UTC-6 (Central (CST))
  - Summer (DST): UTC-5 (CDT)
- FIPS code: 27-29726
- GNIS feature ID: 0664502
- Website: http://hollywoodtownship.com/

Hollywood Township is a rural township in Carver County, Minnesota, United States. The population was 1,058 as of the 2020 census.

== History ==
Hollywood Township was organized in 1860, and named after the holly bush.

The town hall is featured in the cover art and as the album title for The Jayhawks third studio album, Hollywood Town Hall.

== Geography ==
According to the United States Census Bureau, the township has a total area of 36.1 square miles (93 km^{2}), of which 36.0 square miles (93 km^{2}) is land and 0.1 square miles (0.26 km^{2}) (0.36%) is water.

Township 117 North, Range 26 West, Fifth Principal Meridian of the Public Land Survey System.

=== Lakes ===
- Campbell Lake
- Lippert Lake (west three-quarters)

=== Adjacent townships ===
- Woodland Township, Wright County (north)
- Franklin Township, Wright County (northeast)
- Watertown Township (east)
- Camden Township (south)
- Bergen Township, McLeod County (southwest)
- Winsted Township, McLeod County (west)
- Victor Township, Wright County (northwest)

=== Unincorporated community ===
- Oster

=== Cemetery ===
The township contains Saint John's Lutheran Church Cemetery.

=== Major highway ===
- Minnesota State Highway 7

== Demographics ==
Historical population
| Census | Pop. | Note | %± |
|---|---|---|---|
| 1860 | 166 | | — |
| 1870 | 534 | | 221.7% |
| 1880 | 900 | | 68.5% |
| 1890 | 1,042 | | 15.8% |
| 1900 | 1,243 | | 19.3% |
| 1910 | 1,154 | | −7.2% |
| 1920 | 1,075 | | −6.8% |
| 1930 | 1,004 | | −6.6% |
| 1940 | 1,079 | | 7.5% |
| 1950 | 957 | | −11.3% |
| 1960 | 933 | | −2.5% |
| 1970 | 1,064 | | 14.0% |
| 1980 | 1,100 | | 3.4% |
| 1990 | 1,060 | | −3.6% |
| 2000 | 1,102 | | 4.0% |
| 2010 | 1,041 | | −5.5% |
| 2020 | 1,058 | | 1.6% |
U.S. Decennial Census

As of the census of 2000, there were 1,102 people, 371 households, and 307 families residing in the township. The population density was 30.6 inhabitants per square mile (11.8/km^{2}). There were 382 housing units at an average density of 10.6/sq mi (4.1/km^{2}). The racial makeup of the township was 98.55% White, 0.27% African American, 0.73% Asian, 0.36% from other races, and 0.09% from two or more races.

There were 371 households, out of which 35.3% had children under the age of 18 living with them, 76.0% were married couples living together, 2.4% had a female householder with no husband present, and 17.0% were non-families. 12.7% of all households were made up of individuals, and 5.1% had someone living alone who was 65 years of age or older. The average household size was 2.97 and the average family size was 3.26.

In the township the population was spread out, with 26.7% under the age of 18, 8.9% from 18 to 24, 29.2% from 25 to 44, 24.2% from 45 to 64, and 11.0% who were 65 years of age or older. The median age was 37 years. For every 100 females, there were 112.7 males. For every 100 females age 18 and over, there were 110.4 males.

The median income for a household in the township was $52,833, and the median income for a family was $58,000. Males had a median income of $37,188 versus $27,262 for females. The per capita income for the township was $22,664. About 2.3% of families and 3.2% of the population were below the poverty line, including 2.1% of those under age 18 and 4.3% of those age 65 or over.

== Politics ==
Presidential election results

2020 Precinct Results Spreadsheet2016 Precinct Results Spreadsheet2012 Precinct Results Spreadsheet2008 Precinct Results Spreadsheet2004 Precinct Results Spreadsheet2000 Precinct Results Spreadsheet1996 Precinct Results1992 Precinct Results1988 Precinct Results1984 Precinct Results1980 Precinct Results1976 Precinct Results1968 Precinct Results1964 Precinct Results1960 Precinct Results
| Year | Republican | Democratic | Third parties |
|---|---|---|---|
| 2020 | 76.2% 535 | 23.2% 163 | 0.6% 4 |
| 2016 | 71.1% 453 | 23.6% 150 | 5.3% 34 |
| 2012 | 71.0% 453 | 27.0% 172 | 2.0% 13 |
| 2008 | 67.5% 436 | 29.1% 188 | 3.4% 22 |
| 2004 | 67.5% 428 | 30.9% 196 | 1.6% 10 |
| 2000 | 60.9% 355 | 29.2% 170 | 9.9% 58 |
| 1996 | 49.6% 244 | 30.9% 152 | 19.5% 96 |
| 1992 | 43.1% 214 | 25.6% 127 | 31.3% 155 |
| 1988 | 56.9% 243 | 43.1% 184 | 0.0% 0 |
| 1984 | 62.3% 271 | 37.7% 164 | 0.0% 0 |
| 1980 | 61.8% 309 | 30.2% 151 | 8.0% 40 |
| 1976 | 50.0% 244 | 40.6% 198 | 9.4% 46 |
| 1968 | 59.6% 233 | 33.0% 129 | 7.4% 29 |
| 1964 | 63.1% 224 | 35.9% 131 | 0.0% 0 |
| 1960 | 65.6% 271 | 34.4% 142 | 0.0% 0 |
