= Granite Falls Township, Chippewa County, Minnesota =

Granite Falls Township, Minnesota
- Township
- Location within the state of Minnesota Granite Falls Township, Minnesota (the United States)
- Coordinates: 44°51′1″N 95°32′50″W
- Country: United States
- State: Minnesota
- County: Chippewa

Area
  - Total: 31.8 sq mi (82.3 km^{2})
  - Land: 31.5 sq mi (81.5 km^{2})
  - Water: 0.31 sq mi (0.8 km^{2})
- Elevation: 1,037 ft (316 m)

Population (2000)
  - Total: 222
  - Density: 7.0/sq mi (2.7/km^{2})
- Time zone: UTC-6 (Central (CST))
  - Summer (DST): UTC-5 (CDT)
- FIPS code: 27-25262
- GNIS feature ID: 0664323

Granite Falls Township is a township in Chippewa County, Minnesota, United States. The population was 222 at the 2000 census.

== History ==
Granite Falls Township was organized in 1890, and was named for the rock formations at the falls on the Minnesota River.

== Geography ==
According to the United States Census Bureau, the township has a total area of 31.8 square miles (82 km^{2}), of which 31.5 square miles (82 km^{2}) is land, and 0.3 square miles (0.78 km^{2}) (1.01%) is water.

== Demographics ==
As of the census of 2000, there were 222 people, 88 households, and 68 families residing in the township. The population density was 7.1 inhabitants per square mile (2.7/km^{2}). There were 95 housing units at an average density of 3.0 per square mile (1.2/km^{2}). The racial makeup of the township was 95.95% White, 0.45% African American, 2.70% Native American, 0.45% Asian, and 0.45% from two or more races.

There were 88 households, out of which 26.1% had children under the age of 18 living with them, 75.0% were married couples living together, 2.3% had a female householder with no husband present, and 21.6% were non-families. Of these,19.3% of all households were made up of individuals, and 9.1% had someone living alone who was 65 years of age or older. The average household size was 2.52, and the average family size was 2.83.

In the township, the population was spread out, with 23.4% under the age of 18, 3.2% from 18 to 24, 28.4% from 25 to 44, 25.2% from 45 to 64, and 19.8% who were 65 years of age or older. The median age was 42 years. For every 100 females, there were 122.0 males. For every 100 females aged 18 and over, there were 117.9 males.

The median income for a household in the township was $32,273, and the median income for a family was $54,167. Males had a median income of $37,500, versus $26,250 for females. The per capita income for the township was $20,762. About 4.0% of families and 7.0% of the population were below the poverty line, including none of those under the age of 18, and 9.1% of those 65 or over.
