= Watertown, Minnesota =

City in Minnesota, United States

Watertown
- City
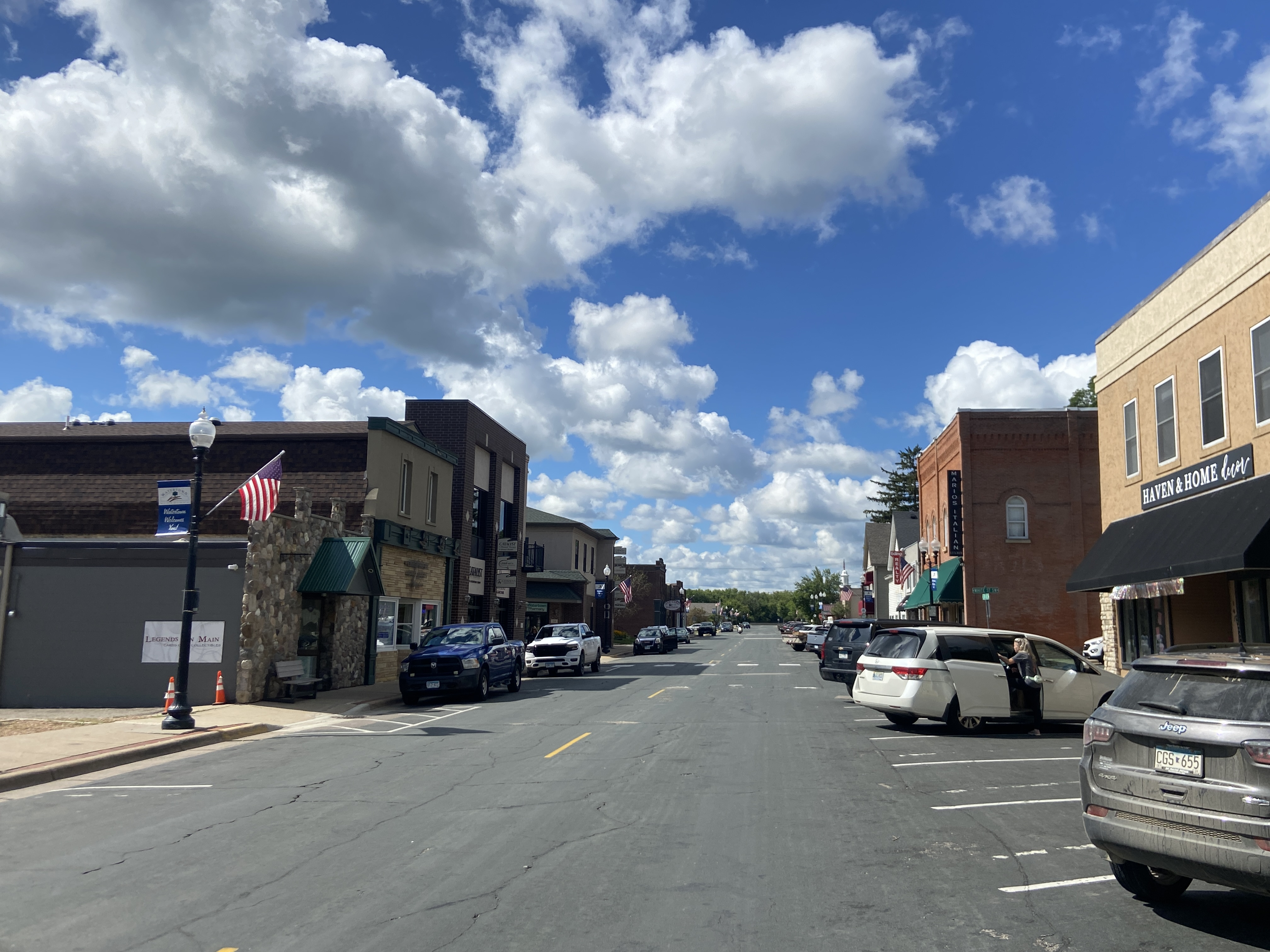
- Uptown Watertown
- Motto: "Heart of the Luce Line Trail."
- Location of the city of Watertown within Carver County, Minnesota
- Coordinates: 44°57′37″N 93°50′35″W
- Country: United States
- State: Minnesota
- County: Carver
- Founded: 1859
- Incorporated: 1877

Area
  - Total: 2.67 sq mi (6.92 km^{2})
  - Land: 2.63 sq mi (6.80 km^{2})
  - Water: 0.046 sq mi (0.12 km^{2})
- Elevation: 958 ft (292 m)

Population (2020)
  - Total: 4,659
  - Estimate (2022): 4,842
  - Density: 1,774.3/sq mi (685.06/km^{2})
- Time zone: UTC-6 (Central)
  - Summer (DST): UTC-5 (CDT)
- ZIP code: 55388
- Area code: 952
- FIPS code: 27-68548
- GNIS feature ID: 2397211
- Website: watertownmn.gov

Watertown is a small city in Carver County, Minnesota, United States, along the South Fork of the Crow River, on the outskirts of the Twin Cities metro area. The population was 4,659 at the 2020 census.

== History ==
Watertown was platted in 1858 and incorporated in 1877. The city took its name from Watertown Township.

== Geography ==
According to the United States Census Bureau, the city has an area of 2.64 square miles (6.84 km^{2}), of which 2.59 square miles (6.71 km^{2}) is land and 0.05 square miles (0.13 km^{2}) is water.

Minnesota State Highway 25 serves as a main route in Watertown.

== Demographics ==
Historical population
Census	Pop.	Note	%±
1880	316		—
1890	362		14.6%
1900	490		35.4%
1910	465		−5.1%
1920	534		14.8%
1930	594		11.2%
1940	737		24.1%
1950	837		13.6%
1960	1,046		25.0%
1970	1,390		32.9%
1980	1,818		30.8%
1990	2,408		32.5%
2000	3,029		25.8%
2010	4,205		38.8%
2020	4,659		10.8%
2022 (est.)	4,842		3.9%
U.S. Decennial Census; 2020 Census

=== 2020 census ===
As of the 2020 census, Watertown had a population of 4,659. The median age was 36.4 years. 27.3% of residents were under the age of 18 and 11.5% of residents were 65 years of age or older. For every 100 females there were 98.7 males, and for every 100 females age 18 and over there were 94.8 males age 18 and over.

0.0% of residents lived in urban areas, while 100.0% lived in rural areas.

There were 1,714 households in Watertown, of which 36.8% had children under the age of 18 living in them. Of all households, 55.1% were married-couple households, 15.6% were households with a male householder and no spouse or partner present, and 20.4% were households with a female householder and no spouse or partner present. About 21.5% of all households were made up of individuals and 8.0% had someone living alone who was 65 years of age or older.

There were 1,772 housing units, of which 3.3% were vacant. The homeowner vacancy rate was 0.1% and the rental vacancy rate was 4.7%.

Racial composition as of the 2020 census
Race	Number	Percent
White	4,331	93.0%
Black or African American	52	1.1%
American Indian and Alaska Native	9	0.2%
Asian	19	0.4%
Native Hawaiian and Other Pacific Islander	0	0.0%
Some other race	55	1.2%
Two or more races	193	4.1%
Hispanic or Latino (of any race)	123	2.6%

=== 2010 census ===
As of the census of 2010, there were 4,205 people, 1,564 households, and 1,075 families living in the city. The population density was 1,623.6 inhabitants per square mile (626.9/km^{2}). There were 1,697 housing units at an average density of 655.2 per square mile (253.0/km^{2}). The racial makeup of the city was 95.8% White, 0.3% African American, 0.4% Native American, 0.8% Asian, 0.6% from other races, and 2.1% from two or more races. Hispanic or Latino of any race were 1.7% of the population.

There were 1,564 households, of which 40.0% had children under the age of 18 living with them, 56.1% were married couples living together, 7.8% had a female householder with no husband present, 4.9% had a male householder with no wife present, and 31.3% were non-families. 25.1% of all households were made up of individuals, and 10.8% had someone living alone who was 65 years of age or older. The average household size was 2.65 and the average family size was 3.22.

The median age in the city was 34.3 years. 29.5% of residents were under the age of 18; 7.3% were between the ages of 18 and 24; 30.8% were from 25 to 44; 22.7% were from 45 to 64; and 9.7% were 65 years of age or older. The gender makeup of the city was 49.2% male and 50.8% female.

=== 2000 census ===
As of the census of 2000, there were 3,029 people, 1,078 households, and 775 families living in the city. The population density was 1,808.0 inhabitants per square mile (698.1/km^{2}). There were 1,100 housing units at an average density of 656.6 per square mile (253.5/km^{2}). The racial makeup of the city was 97.69% White, 0.33% African American, 0.20% Native American, 0.53% Asian, 0.43% from other races, and 0.83% from two or more races. Hispanic or Latino of any race were 1.45% of the population.

There were 1,078 households, out of which 40.3% had children under the age of 18 living with them, 57.3% were married couples living together, 9.7% had a female householder with no husband present, and 28.1% were non-families. 24.1% of all households were made up of individuals, and 11.3% had someone living alone who was 65 years of age or older. The average household size was 2.71 and the average family size was 3.22.

In the city, the population was spread out, with 29.2% under the age of 18, 8.0% from 18 to 24, 31.2% from 25 to 44, 17.8% from 45 to 64, and 13.9% who were 65 years of age or older. The median age was 34 years. For every 100 females, there were 92.8 males. For every 100 females age 18 and over, there were 92.4 males.

The median income for a household in the city was $47,500, and the median income for a family was $56,136. Males had a median income of $37,277 versus $27,083 for females. The per capita income for the city was $18,918. About 4.4% of families and 6.3% of the population were below the poverty line, including 8.0% of those under age 18 and 9.5% of those age 65 or over.

== Notable people ==
- Monika Czinano – Basketball player with MTK, a Budapest-based team in the top Hungarian league. Former basketball player at the University of Iowa; graduated from Watertown–Mayer HS in 2018. Former teammate of Caitlin Clark.
- Harry Elliott – Professional baseball player, graduated from Watertown HS in 1942.
- Matt Janning – Professional basketball player, born in Watertown in 1988.
- Gordon Paschka (1920–1964) - Professional football player, went to high school in Watertown.
- Marion Ross – Film and television actress, born in Watertown in 1928.
