= Dahlgren Township, Carver County, Minnesota =

Township in Minnesota, United States

Dahlgren
- Township
- Location within the state of Minnesota Dahlgren (the United States)
- Coordinates: 44°45′51″N 93°42′43″W
- Country: United States
- State: Minnesota
- County: Carver

Area
  - Total: 35.9 sq mi (93.0 km^{2})
  - Land: 35.5 sq mi (91.9 km^{2})
  - Water: 0.42 sq mi (1.1 km^{2})
- Elevation: 915 ft (279 m)

Population (2020)
  - Total: 854
- Time zone: UTC-6 (Central (CST))
  - Summer (DST): UTC-5 (CDT)
- FIPS code: 27-14482
- GNIS feature ID: 0663913
- Website: http://www.dahlgrentownship.com/

Dahlgren Township is a rural township in Carver County, Minnesota, United States. The township's economy is based on commercial agriculture around dairying, livestock and cash grain farming. The population was 854 as of the 2020 census.

== History ==
Dahlgren Township was organized in 1864, and named for John A. Dahlgren, a United States Navy admiral.

== Geography ==
According to the United States Census Bureau, the township has a total area of 35.9 square miles (93 km^{2}), of which 35.5 square miles (92 km^{2}) is land and 0.4 square miles (1.0 km^{2}) (1.22%) is water.

The west edge of the city of Carver is located within the township geographically but is a separate entity.

Township 115 North, Range 24 West, Fifth Principal Meridian of the Public Land Survey System.

=== Lakes ===
- Ave Lake
- E Union Lake
- Gaystock Lake
- Maria Lake (northeast quarter)
- Miller Lake

=== Adjacent townships ===
- Laketown Township (north)
- San Francisco Township (south)
- Hancock Township (southwest)
- Benton Township (west)
- Waconia Township (northwest)

=== Unincorporated communities ===
- Augusta
- Dahlgren
- East Union

=== Cemeteries ===
The township contains five cemeteries: Augustana, German Reformed, Preiss, Saint Nickolas and Swedish Lutheran.

=== Major highway ===
- U.S. Highway 212

== Demographics ==
Historical population
Census	Pop.	Note	%±
1870	1,303		—
1880	1,220		−6.4%
1890	1,146		−6.1%
1900	1,117		−2.5%
1910	1,051		−5.9%
1920	973		−7.4%
1930	949		−2.5%
1940	1,024		7.9%
1950	916		−10.5%
1960	920		0.4%
1970	1,147		24.7%
1980	1,225		6.8%
1990	1,296		5.8%
2000	1,453		12.1%
2010	1,331		−8.4%
2020	854		−35.8%
U.S. Decennial Census

As of the census of 2000, there were 1,453 people, 479 households, and 403 families residing in the township. The population density was 41.0 inhabitants per square mile (15.8/km^{2}). There were 483 housing units at an average density of 13.6/sq mi (5.3/km^{2}). The racial makeup of the township was 98.76% White, 0.21% Native American, 0.34% Asian, 0.14% from other races, and 0.55% from two or more races. Hispanic or Latino of any race were 0.21% of the population.

There were 479 households, out of which 40.7% had children under the age of 18 living with them, 76.8% were married couples living together, 4.8% had a female householder with no husband present, and 15.7% were non-families. 10.6% of all households were made up of individuals, and 3.8% had someone living alone who was 65 years of age or older. The average household size was 3.03 and the average family size was 3.28.

In the township, the population was spread out, with 29.7% under the age of 18, 6.8% from 18 to 24, 31.2% from 25 to 44, 23.9% from 45 to 64, and 8.4% who were 65 years of age or older. The median age was 38 years. For every 100 females, there were 110.3 males. For every 100 females age 18 and over, there were 111.0 males.

The median income for a household in the township was $63,224, and the median income for a family was $68,977. Males had a median income of $41,250 versus $28,477 for females. The per capita income for the township was $23,747. About 1.0% of families and 2.6% of the population were below the poverty line, including 2.2% of those under age 18 and 4.8% of those ages 65 or over.

== Politics ==
Presidential election results

2020 Precinct Results Spreadsheet2016 Precinct Results Spreadsheet2012 Precinct Results Spreadsheet2008 Precinct Results Spreadsheet2004 Precinct Results Spreadsheet2000 Precinct Results Spreadsheet1996 Precinct Results1992 Precinct Results1988 Precinct Results1984 Precinct Results1980 Precinct Results1976 Precinct Results1968 Precinct Results1964 Precinct Results1960 Precinct Results
Year	Republican	Democratic	Third parties
2020	66.1% 592	32.0% 287	1.9% 17
2016	65.2% 530	27.9% 227	6.9% 56
2012	61.4% 498	34.9% 283	3.7% 30
2008	62.3% 508	35.2% 287	2.5% 21
2004	65.7% 545	33.4% 277	0.9% 7
2000	59.0% 419	34.5% 245	6.5% 46
1996	40.3% 253	42.8% 269	16.9% 106
1992	34.2% 224	28.2% 185	37.6% 246
1988	59.2% 375	40.8% 258	0.0% 0
1984	60.4% 343	39.6% 225	0.0% 0
1980	56.5% 334	34.4% 203	9.1% 54
1976	47.1% 234	49.1% 244	3.8% 19
1968	62.9% 247	33.8% 133	3.3% 13
1964	56.5% 212	43.5% 163	0.0% 0
1960	63.6% 246	36.4% 141	0.0% 0
