= Minnesota State Highway 25 =

State highway in Minnesota, United States

Trunk Highway 25
- MN 25 highlighted in red

Route information
- Maintained by MnDOT
- Length: 156.066 mi (251.164 km)
- Existed: November 2, 1920–present

Major junctions
- South end: US 169 at Belle Plaine
- MN 5 at Green Isle; US 212 at Norwood Young America; MN 7 near Mayer; US 12 at Montrose; MN 55 at Buffalo; I-94 / US 52 at Monticello; US 10 at Big Lake; MN 23 at Foley; MN 27 at Pierz
- North end: MN 210 at Brainerd

Location
- Country: United States
- State: Minnesota
- Counties: Scott, Sibley, Carver, Wright, Sherburne, Benton, Morrison, Crow Wing

Highway system
- Minnesota Trunk Highway System; Interstate; US; State; Legislative; Scenic
| ← MN 24 | → MN 26 |

Minnesota State Highway 25 (MN 25) is a 156.066-mile-long (251.164 km) highway in Minnesota, which runs from its interchange with U.S. Highway 169 in Belle Plaine and continues north to its intersection with State Highway 210 in Brainerd.

== Route description ==
State Highway 25 serves as a north–south route in central Minnesota between Belle Plaine, Norwood Young America, Watertown, Buffalo, Monticello, Big Lake, Becker, Foley, and Brainerd.

The route travels east–west between Belle Plaine and Green Isle for 15 miles.

Highway 25 crosses the Minnesota River at Belle Plaine.

The route crosses the Highway 25 Bridge at the Mississippi River between Monticello and Big Lake.

== History ==
State Highway 25 was authorized November 2, 1920 from Belle Plaine to Big Lake.

The roadway was fully graveled by 1928. It was paved in stages from north to south throughout the 1930s: from Big Lake to Buffalo in 1931, Buffalo to Montrose in 1932, Montrose to Watertown in 1933, and Watertown to Norwood in 1934.

Paving was completed in Belle Plaine in 1937, and the remaining gravel section through Sibley County was paved in 1950.

When the four-lane bypass of U.S. 169 around Belle Plaine was built in 1955, Highway 25 was extended east along 169's former alignment to intersect the new highway.

In 1961, Highway 25 was extended north along what had previously been State Highway 218 from Becker to Merrifield. This highway was already paved in its entirety.

In 2001, the northernmost segment of the highway between State Highway 210 and Merrifield was turned back to Crow Wing County maintenance and is now designated County Road 3.

== Major intersections ==
| County | Location | mi | km | Destinations | Notes |
|---|---|---|---|---|---|
| Scott | Belle Plaine | 0.000 | 0.000 | US 169 | Interchange |
| Minnesota River | | 2.008– 2.120 | 3.232– 3.412 | Highway 25 Bridge | |
| Sibley–Carver county line | Faxon–San Francisco township line | 2.141 | 3.446 | CSAH 6 / CSAH 40 / Minnesota River Valley Scenic Byway | Minnesota River Valley Scenic Byway eastern terminus |
| Sibley | Green Isle | 25.884 | 41.656 | MN 5 west – Gaylord | South end of MN 5 overlap |
| Carver | Young America Township | 22.540 | 36.275 | US 212 west / CR 131 – Glencoe | West end of US 212 overlap |
| Carver | Norwood Young America | 24.874 | 40.031 | US 212 east / CSAH 33 – Chaska | East end of US 212 overlap |
| Carver | Young America Township | 27.741 | 44.645 | MN 5 east – Waconia | North end of MN 5 overlap |
| Carver | Watertown Township | 35.305– 35.335 | 56.818– 56.866 | MN 7 – Minneapolis, Hutchinson | Roundabout |
| Wright | Montrose | 48.383 | 77.865 | US 12 west / CSAH 12 – Litchfield | West end of US 12 overlap |
| Wright | Rockford Township | 50.481 | 81.241 | US 12 east – Minneapolis | East end of US 12 overlap |
| Wright | Buffalo | 58.724 | 94.507 | MN 55 – Minneapolis, Annandale | |
| Wright | Monticello | 68.040 | 109.500 | I-94 (US 52) – Minneapolis, St. Paul, St. Cloud | I-94 exit 193; interchange. |
| Mississippi River | | 68.722– 68.912 | 110.597– 110.903 | Highway 25 Bridge | |
| Sherburne | Big Lake Township | 68.410 | 110.095 | CSAH 11 / CSAH 14 / I-94 Alt. west – Foley, St. Cloud | |
| Sherburne | Big Lake | 71.753 | 115.475 | US 10 east – St. Paul | East end of US 10 overlap |
| Sherburne | Becker Township | | | CSAH 11 / I-94 Alt. east – Monticello, Santiago | |
| Sherburne | Becker | 81.241 | 130.745 | US 10 west / CR 52 – St. Cloud | West end of US 10 overlap |
| Benton | St. George Township | 93.873 | 151.074 | MN 95 – Princeton, St. Cloud | |
| Benton | Gilmanton Township | 99.312 | 159.827 | MN 23 – Milaca, St. Cloud | |
| Morrison | Genola | 128.230 | 206.366 | MN 27 west – Little Falls | South end of MN 27 overlap |
| Morrison | Buh Township | 132.351 | 212.998 | MN 27 east / CSAH 46 – Lastrup, Onamia | North end of MN 27 overlap |
| Crow Wing | Brainerd | 155.751 | 250.657 | MN 18 (Oak Street) – Garrison | |
| Crow Wing | Brainerd | 157.069 | 252.778 | MN 210 / CSAH 3 / Inter-County C / Great River Road (National Route) – Crosby, Merrifield, Crosslake | Northern terminus; roadway continues as CSAH 3 / Inter-County C |
1.000 mi = 1.609 km; 1.000 km = 0.621 mi: Concurrency terminus
