= San Francisco Township, Carver County, Minnesota =

Township in Minnesota, United States

San Francisco Township
- Township
- San Francisco Township Hall, the historic District Number 22 School Building, listed on the National Register of Historic Places

- Location within the state of Minnesota San Francisco Township (the United States)
- Coordinates: 44°42′9″N 93°42′54″W
- Country: United States
- State: Minnesota
- County: Carver

Area
  - Total: 24.0 sq mi (62.2 km^{2})
  - Land: 23.2 sq mi (60.0 km^{2})
  - Water: 0.89 sq mi (2.3 km^{2})
- Elevation: 879 ft (268 m)

Population (2020)
  - Total: 871
- Time zone: UTC-6 (Central (CST))
  - Summer (DST): UTC-5 (CDT)
- FIPS code: 27-58486
- GNIS feature ID: 0665551
- Website: https://sanfranciscotownship.com/

San Francisco Township is a rural township in Carver County, Minnesota, United States. The population was 871 as of the 2020 census.

== History ==
San Francisco Township was organized in 1858, and named after San Francisco, California.

== Geography ==
According to the United States Census Bureau, the township has a total area of 24.0 square miles (62.2 km^{2}), of which 23.1 square miles (60.0 km^{2}) is land and 0.9 square miles (2.3 km^{2}) (3.66%) is water.

Township 114 North, Range 24 West, Fifth Principal Meridian of the Public Land Survey System.

=== Lakes ===
- Hallquist Lake
- Horse Shoe Lake
- Johnson Lake
- Kelly Lake
- Long Lake
- Lundquist Lake
- Rapid Lake
- Scott Lake

=== Adjacent townships ===
- Dahlgren Township (north)
- Louisville Township, Scott County (east)
- Sand Creek Township, Scott County (east)
- St. Lawrence Township, Scott County (southeast)
- Faxon Township, Sibley County (west)
- Hancock Township (west)
- Benton Township (northwest)

=== Cemetery ===
The township contains Swedish Methodist Cemetery.

== Demographics ==
Historical population
Census	Pop.	Note	%±
1860	608		—
1870	754		24.0%
1880	736		−2.4%
1890	667		−9.4%
1900	610		−8.5%
1910	564		−7.5%
1920	504		−10.6%
1930	497		−1.4%
1940	437		−12.1%
1950	400		−8.5%
1960	436		9.0%
1970	509		16.7%
1980	650		27.7%
1990	773		18.9%
2000	888		14.9%
2010	832		−6.3%
2020	871		4.7%
U.S. Decennial Census

As of the census of 2000, there were 888 people, 293 households, and 242 families residing in the township. The population density was 38.4 inhabitants per square mile (14.8/km^{2}). There were 300 housing units at an average density of 13.0/sq mi (5.0/km^{2}). The racial makeup of the township was 98.99% White, 0.11% Asian, 0.23% from other races, and 0.68% from two or more races. Hispanic or Latino of any race were 1.01% of the population.

There were 293 households, out of which 43.7% had children under the age of 18 living with them, 74.1% were married couples living together, 4.4% had a female householder with no husband present, and 17.1% were non-families. 11.3% of all households were made up of individuals, and 3.8% had someone living alone who was 65 years of age or older. The average household size was 3.03 and the average family size was 3.33.

In the township the population was spread out, with 31.6% under the age of 18, 6.0% from 18 to 24, 31.6% from 25 to 44, 24.3% from 45 to 64, and 6.4% who were 65 years of age or older. The median age was 37 years. For every 100 females, there were 114.5 males. For every 100 females age 18 and over, there were 110.0 males.

The median income for a household in the township was $68,889, and the median income for a family was $70,313. Males had a median income of $43,750 versus $30,069 for females. The per capita income for the township was $24,734. None of the families and 0.5% of the population were living below the poverty line, including no under eighteens and none of those over 64.

== Politics ==
Presidential election results

Precinct General Election Results
Year	Republican	Democratic	Third parties
2020	66.1% 425	31.7% 204	2.2% 14
2016	64.6% 381	27.5% 162	7.9% 47
2012	58.9% 331	39.3% 221	1.8% 10
2008	57.1% 301	41.6% 219	1.3% 7
2004	56.4% 297	42.7% 225	0.9% 5
2000	56.0% 262	38.9% 182	5.1% 24
1996	31.3% 118	50.9% 192	17.8% 67
1992	27.8% 111	34.0% 136	38.3% 153
1988	49.2% 164	50.8% 169	0.0% 0
1984	60.8% 194	39.2% 125	0.0% 0
1980	45.7% 155	40.7% 138	13.6% 46
1976	43.0% 116	54.4% 147	2.6% 7
1968	57.5% 111	37.8% 73	4.7% 9
1964	41.1% 69	58.9% 99	0.0% 0
1960	67.4% 122	32.6% 59	0.0% 0
