= Mayer, Minnesota =

City in Minnesota, United States

Mayer
- City
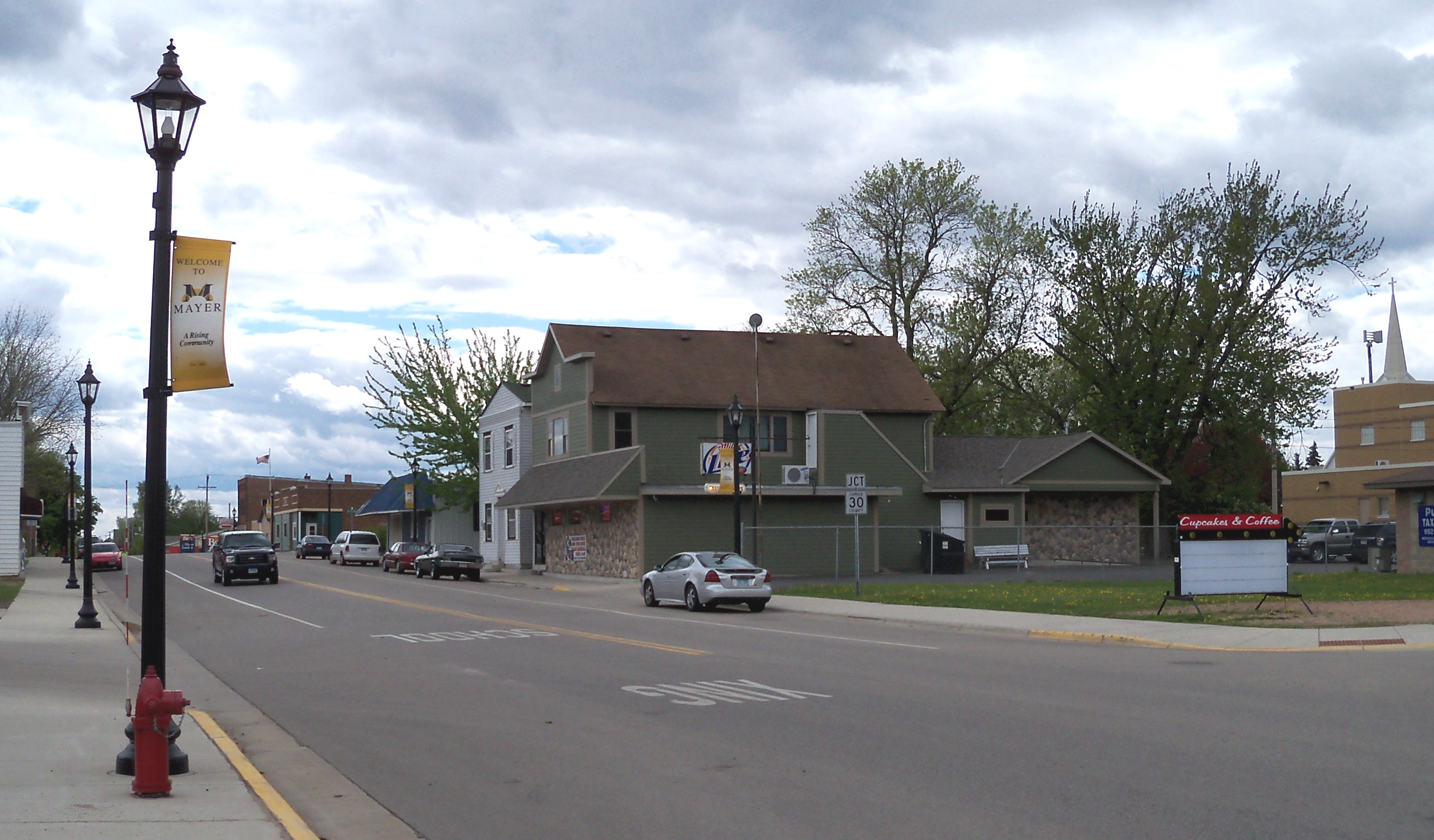
- Motto: "A Rising Community"
- Location of the city of Mayer within Carver County, Minnesota
- Coordinates: 44°53′13″N 93°53′25″W
- Country: United States
- State: Minnesota
- County: Carver

Area
  - Total: 1.40 sq mi (3.63 km^{2})
  - Land: 1.37 sq mi (3.56 km^{2})
  - Water: 0.027 sq mi (0.07 km^{2})
- Elevation: 968 ft (295 m)

Population (2020)
  - Total: 2,453
  - Density: 1,785.9/sq mi (689.54/km^{2})
- Time zone: UTC-6 (Central (CST))
  - Summer (DST): UTC-5 (CDT)
- ZIP code: 55360
- Area code: 952
- FIPS code: 27-41138
- GNIS feature ID: 2395049
- Website: www.cityofmayer.com

Mayer (/ˈmeɪər/ MAY-ər) is a city in Carver County, Minnesota, United States, along the South Fork of the Crow River. The population was 2,453 at the 2020 census.

== History ==
A post office was first established in Helvetia in 1875, and the name was changed to Mayer in 1888. The name Mayer was given it by railroad officials.

== Geography ==
According to the United States Census Bureau, the city has a total area of 1.42 square miles (3.68 km^{2}), of which 1.39 square miles (3.60 km^{2}) is land and 0.03 square miles (0.08 km^{2}) is water.

Minnesota State Highway 25 serves as a main route in Mayer. State Highway 7 passes in proximity to the city.

== Demographics ==
Historical population
| Census | Pop. | Note | %± |
|---|---|---|---|
| 1910 | 161 | | — |
| 1920 | 144 | | −10.6% |
| 1930 | 138 | | −4.2% |
| 1940 | 146 | | 5.8% |
| 1950 | 153 | | 4.8% |
| 1960 | 179 | | 17.0% |
| 1970 | 325 | | 81.6% |
| 1980 | 388 | | 19.4% |
| 1990 | 471 | | 21.4% |
| 2000 | 554 | | 17.6% |
| 2010 | 1,749 | | 215.7% |
| 2020 | 2,453 | | 40.3% |
U.S. Decennial Census

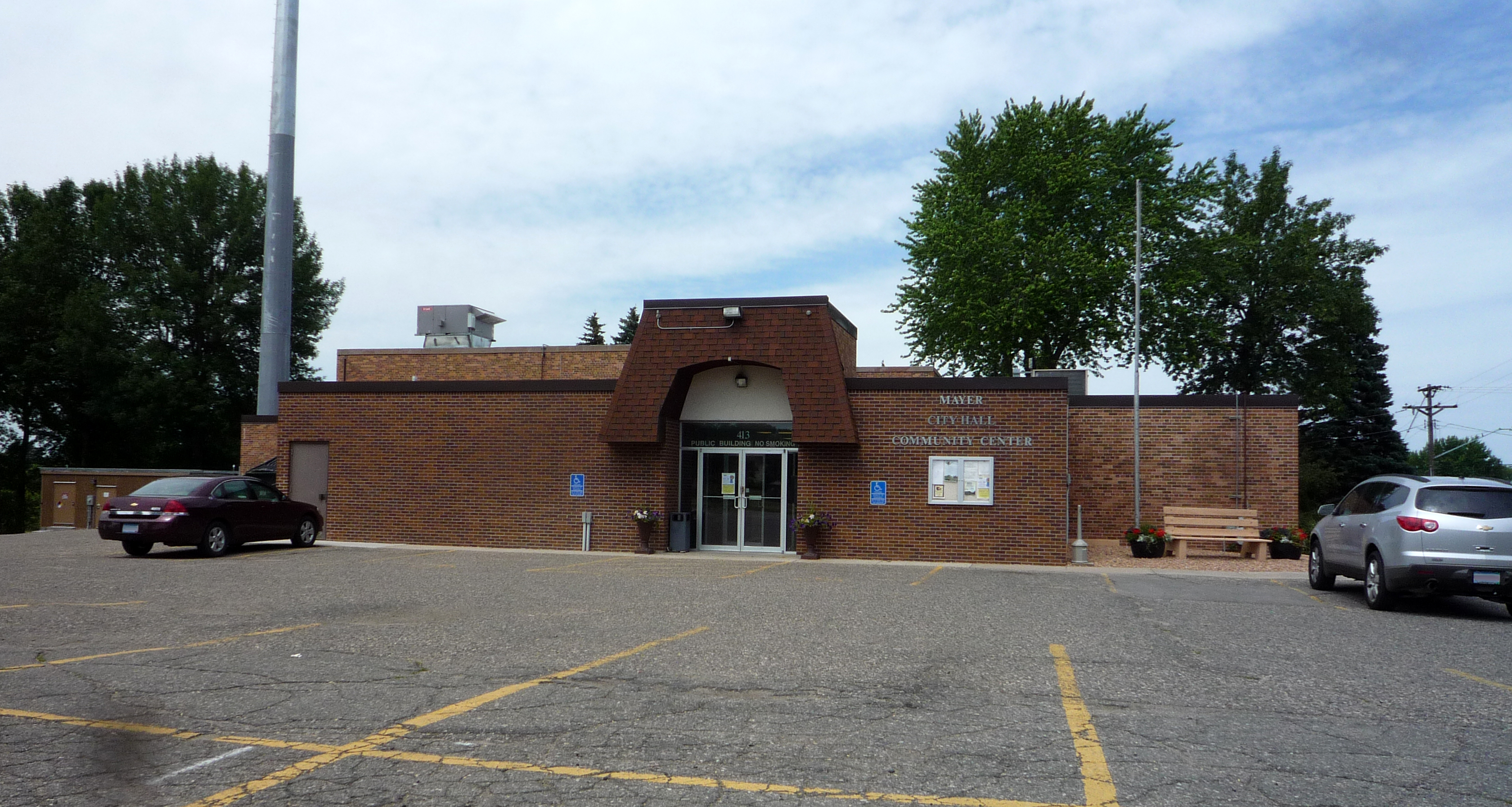
City Hall and Community Building; a cellphone/radio tower rises in the background.

=== 2020 census ===
As of the 2020 census, Mayer had a population of 2,453. The median age was 32.3 years. 33.5% of residents were under the age of 18 and 7.2% of residents were 65 years of age or older. For every 100 females there were 98.3 males, and for every 100 females age 18 and over there were 99.1 males age 18 and over.

0.0% of residents lived in urban areas, while 100.0% lived in rural areas.

There were 800 households in Mayer, of which 50.0% had children under the age of 18 living in them. Of all households, 69.8% were married-couple households, 10.6% were households with a male householder and no spouse or partner present, and 11.4% were households with a female householder and no spouse or partner present. About 13.1% of all households were made up of individuals and 3.7% had someone living alone who was 65 years of age or older.

There were 821 housing units, of which 2.6% were vacant. The homeowner vacancy rate was 1.3% and the rental vacancy rate was 2.0%.

Racial composition as of the 2020 census
| Race | Number | Percent |
|---|---|---|
| White | 2,241 | 91.4% |
| Black or African American | 20 | 0.8% |
| American Indian and Alaska Native | 2 | 0.1% |
| Asian | 33 | 1.3% |
| Native Hawaiian and Other Pacific Islander | 0 | 0.0% |
| Some other race | 45 | 1.8% |
| Two or more races | 112 | 4.6% |
| Hispanic or Latino (of any race) | 66 | 2.7% |

=== 2010 census ===
As of the census of 2010, there were 1,749 people, 589 households, and 471 families living in the city. The population density was 1,258.3 inhabitants per square mile (485.8/km^{2}). There were 619 housing units at an average density of 445.3 per square mile (171.9/km^{2}). The racial makeup of the city was 95.2% White, 1.1% African American, 0.1% Native American, 1.7% Asian, 0.3% from other races, and 1.5% from two or more races. Hispanic or Latino of any race were 1.3% of the population.

There were 589 households, of which 50.4% had children under the age of 18 living with them, 70.8% were married couples living together, 4.6% had a female householder with no husband present, 4.6% had a male householder with no wife present, and 20.0% were non-families. 13.9% of all households were made up of individuals, and 3.5% had someone living alone who was 65 years of age or older. The average household size was 2.96 and the average family size was 3.30.

The median age in the city was 30.4 years. 32.9% of residents were under the age of 18; 4.9% were between the ages of 18 and 24; 39.2% were from 25 to 44; 17.1% were from 45 to 64; and 5.8% were 65 years of age or older. The gender makeup of the city was 52.0% male and 48.0% female.

=== 2000 census ===
As of the census of 2000, there were 554 people, 200 households, and 147 families living in the city. The population density was 572.0 inhabitants per square mile (220.9/km^{2}). There were 205 housing units at an average density of 211.7 per square mile (81.7/km^{2}). The racial makeup of the city was 98.56% White, 0.90% Asian, 0.54% from other races. Hispanic or Latino of any race were 2.17% of the population.

There were 199 households, out of which 35.2% had children under the age of 18 living with them, 66.8% were married couples living together, 5.0% had a female householder with no husband present, and 26.1% were non-families. 20.1% of all households were made up of individuals, and 10.6% had someone living alone who was 65 years of age or older. The average household size was 2.78 and the average family size was 3.26.

In the city, the population was spread out, with 27.1% under the age of 18, 7.9% from 18 to 24, 31.2% from 25 to 44, 22.4% from 45 to 64, and 11.4% who were 65 years of age or older. The median age was 35 years. For every 100 females, there were 105.2 males. For every 100 females age 18 and over, there were 101.0 males.

The median income for a household in the city was $48,125, and the median income for a family was $55,000. Males had a median income of $34,375 versus $26,458 for females. The per capita income for the city was $18,547. None of the families and 2.0% of the population were living below the poverty line, including no under eighteens and 7.8% of those over 64.

== Politics ==
Presidential election results

Presidential elections results
| Year | Republican | Democratic | Third parties |
|---|---|---|---|
| 2020 | 70.2% 995 | 27.1% 384 | 2.7% 38 |
| 2016 | 69.0% 747 | 23.8% 258 | 7.2% 78 |
| 2012 | 67.5% 651 | 31.0% 299 | 1.5% 14 |
| 2008 | 60.4% 555 | 38.4% 353 | 1.2% 11 |
| 2004 | 69.7% 411 | 28.8% 170 | 1.5% 9 |
| 2000 | 63.6% 168 | 28.0% 74 | 8.4% 22 |

== Mayer Blazers ==
The city of Mayer is the Home of the Mayer Blazers. Ball playing in Mayer has a history that goes back nearly 100 years, and has always been strongly supported by the community.

On April 10, 1906, the village council passed a motion to rent four lots owned by the village called Thomas Slough, to be used for ball purposes. Council support of the game continued in 1914.

The Mayer Baseball Club was organized in the Depression years of the early 1930s. In 1934, the city council, with the encouragement of the community, purchased three-plus acres of land from the Haueters. This land was located between Zion Lutheran School, and the Mayer Public School buildings. The Mayer Baseball team started league play in 1935.

Since 1943, the Mayer Blazers have made seven state tournament appearances. In 1945, Mayer took home second place honors in the Class A state tournament. Their strongest state tournament showing came in 1973, when they finished third.

In 1976, Clarence Guetzkow was elected to the Minnesota Amateur Baseball Hall of Fame in recognition of his tireless allegiance to Mayer Baseball, the Crow River Valley League, and Minnesota Amateur Baseball as a whole.
