= Cologne, Minnesota =

City in Minnesota, United States

Cologne
- City
- Motto: "A Great Place To Live, Work, And Play!"
- Location of the city of Cologne within Carver County, Minnesota
- Coordinates: 44°46′11″N 93°47′35″W
- Country: United States
- State: Minnesota
- County: Carver

Area
  - Total: 1.91 sq mi (4.95 km^{2})
  - Land: 1.79 sq mi (4.63 km^{2})
  - Water: 0.12 sq mi (0.32 km^{2})
- Elevation: 945 ft (288 m)

Population (2020)
  - Total: 2,047
  - Density: 1,144.7/sq mi (441.97/km^{2})
- Time zone: UTC-6 (Central (CST))
  - Summer (DST): UTC-5 (CDT)
- ZIP code: 55322
- Area code: 952
- FIPS code: 27-12664
- GNIS feature ID: 2393601
- Website: https://www.colognemn.com/

Cologne (/kəˈloʊn/ kə-LOHN) is a city in Carver County, Minnesota, United States. The population was 2,047 at the 2020 census, up from 1,519 at the 2010 census. The city is approximately 30 miles from Minneapolis.

== Geography ==
According to the United States Census Bureau, the city has a total area of 1.87 square miles (4.84 km^{2}), of which 1.75 square miles (4.53 km^{2}) is land and 0.12 square miles (0.31 km^{2}) is water.

== Infrastructure ==
=== Transportation ===
U.S. Highway 212 and Minnesota State Highway 284 are two of the main routes in Cologne. The former Milwaukee Road main line serves Cologne.

== History ==
Cologne was platted in 1880, and incorporated in 1881. The community was named for Cologne, Germany.

In 1939, the town of Cologne was preserved on film in the amateur short subject Cologne: From the Diary of Ray and Esther, which chronicles aspects of life in the German-American community prior to the American engagement in World War II. The film was named to the National Film Registry in 2001, and is one of only a half-dozen amateur works to be included on the list.

In March 2015 the city of Cologne, Minnesota hired Jesse Dickson as their city administrator.

In November 2016 Matt Lein was elected Mayor.

== Demographics ==
Historical population
Census	Pop.	Note	%±
1880	60		—
1890	193		221.7%
1900	238		23.3%
1910	390		63.9%
1920	383		−1.8%
1930	355		−7.3%
1940	427		20.3%
1950	462		8.2%
1960	454		−1.7%
1970	518		14.1%
1980	545		5.2%
1990	563		3.3%
2000	1,012		79.8%
2010	1,519		50.1%
2020	2,047		34.8%
U.S. Decennial Census

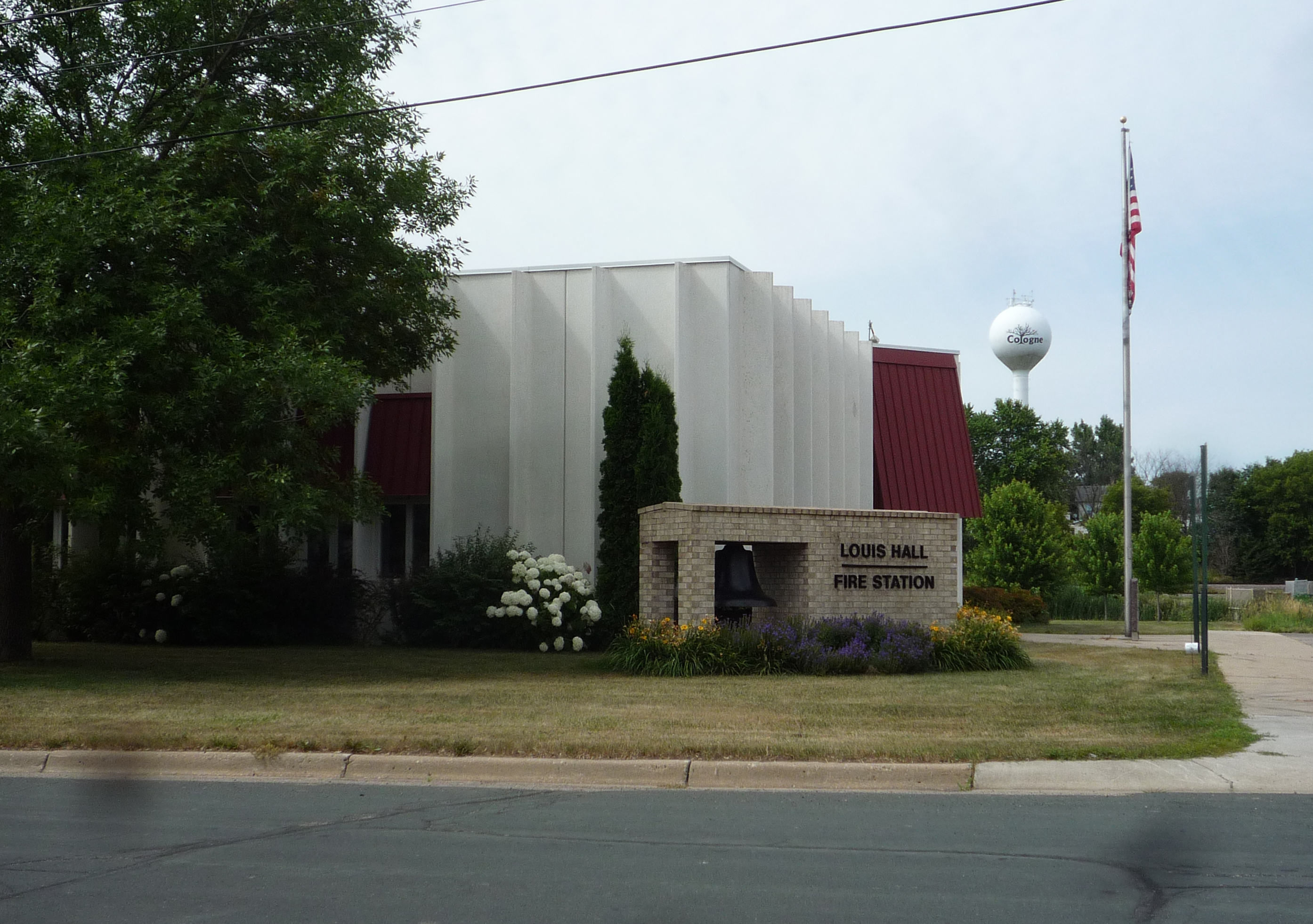
Louis Hall and Fire Station with Water Tower in background

Historical population of the former village of Benton prior to annexation by Cologne
Census	Pop.	Note	%±
1880	97		—
1890	39		−59.8%
1900	52		33.3%
1910	42		−19.2%
1920	46		9.5%
1960	63		—
2020	2,047		—
U.S. Census for Benton

=== 2020 census ===
As of the 2020 census, Cologne had a population of 2,047. The median age was 34.7 years. 30.0% of residents were under the age of 18 and 9.3% of residents were 65 years of age or older. For every 100 females there were 102.5 males, and for every 100 females age 18 and over there were 99.3 males age 18 and over.

0.0% of residents lived in urban areas, while 100.0% lived in rural areas.

There were 734 households in Cologne, of which 42.9% had children under the age of 18 living in them. Of all households, 65.7% were married-couple households, 13.2% were households with a male householder and no spouse or partner present, and 14.2% were households with a female householder and no spouse or partner present. About 16.7% of all households were made up of individuals and 4.6% had someone living alone who was 65 years of age or older.

There were 756 housing units, of which 2.9% were vacant. The homeowner vacancy rate was 0.7% and the rental vacancy rate was 5.3%.

Racial composition as of the 2020 census
Race	Number	Percent
White	1,866	91.2%
Black or African American	29	1.4%
American Indian and Alaska Native	2	0.1%
Asian	22	1.1%
Native Hawaiian and Other Pacific Islander	0	0.0%
Some other race	26	1.3%
Two or more races	102	5.0%
Hispanic or Latino (of any race)	73	3.6%

=== 2010 census ===
As of the census of 2010, there were 1,519 people, 539 households, and 398 families living in the city. The population density was 868.0 inhabitants per square mile (335.1/km^{2}). There were 562 housing units at an average density of 321.1 units per square mile (124.0 units/km^{2}). The racial makeup of the city was 94.9% White, 0.9% African American, 1.2% Asian, 1.4% from other races, and 1.6% from two or more races. Hispanic or Latino of any race were 3.2% of the population.

There were 539 households, of which 45.3% had children under the age of 18 living with them, 63.8% were married couples living together, 5.0% had a female householder with no husband present, 5.0% had a male householder with no wife present, and 26.2% were non-families. 19.1% of all households were made up of individuals, and 4.6% had someone living alone who was 65 years of age or older. The average household size was 2.82 and the average family size was 3.29.

The median age in the city was 32 years. 32.1% of residents were under the age of 18; 5.9% were between the ages of 18 and 24; 37.2% were from 25 to 44; 18.5% were from 45 to 64; and 6.3% were 65 years of age or older. The gender makeup of the city was 52.1% male and 47.9% female.

=== 2000 census ===
As of the census of 2000, there were 1,012 people, 385 households, and 279 families living in the city. The population density was 1,343.5 inhabitants per square mile (518.7/km^{2}). There were 392 housing units at an average density of 520.4 units per square mile (200.9 units/km^{2}). The racial makeup of the city was 97.43% White, 1.48% Asian, 0.49% from other races, and 0.59% from two or more races. Hispanic or Latino of any race were 1.48% of the population.

There were 385 households, out of which 38.2% had children under the age of 18 living with them, 61.8% were married couples living together, 6.5% had a female householder with no husband present, and 27.5% were non-families. 20.3% of all households were made up of individuals, and 8.1% had someone living alone who was 65 years of age or older. The average household size was 2.63 and the average family size was 3.06.

In the city, the population was spread out, with 28.4% under the age of 18, 7.4% from 18 to 24, 41.2% from 25 to 44, 14.7% from 45 to 64, and 8.3% who were 65 years of age or older. The median age was 31 years. For every 100 females, there were 110.0 males. For every 100 females age 18 and over, there were 106.6 males.

The median income for a household in the city was $54,583, and the median income for a family was $61,471. Males had a median income of $40,034 versus $28,382 for females. The per capita income for the city was $20,955. About 0.7% of families and 1.9% of the population were below the poverty line, including none of those under age 18 and 2.5% of those age 65 or over.

== Politics ==
Matt Lein is the mayor of Cologne Carver County, MN is leaning conservative. In Carver County, MN 46.4% of the people voted Democrat in the last presidential election, 51.2% voted for the Republican Party, and the remaining 2.4% voted Independent. Carver County has voted Republican in every presidential election since 2000.

=== Presidential elections ===
Precinct Results
Year	Republican	Democratic	Third parties
2020	61.1% 773	36.7% 465	2.2% 28
2016	60.3% 584	31.2% 302	8.5% 83
2012	54.7% 440	43.4% 349	1.9% 15
2008	55.4% 315	41.7% 322	2.9% 22
2004	61.4% 401	37.8% 247	0.8% 5
2000	52.9% 279	38.5% 203	8.6% 45
1996	33.4% 122	53.4% 195	13.2% 48
1992	31.1% 91	43.0% 126	25.9% 76
1988	43.1% 125	56.9% 165	0.0% 0
1984	47.2% 133	52.8% 149	0.0% 0
1980	35.8% 107	55.2% 165	9.0% 27
1976	28.7% 81	68.4% 193	2.9% 8
1972	35.4% 90	59.1% 150	5.5% 14
1968	34.4% 74	62.8% 135	2.8% 6
1964	29.6% 64	70.4% 152	0.0% 0
1960	29.3% 61	73.7% 171	0.0% 0

== Arts and culture ==
=== Museums and other points of interest ===
Cologne has several buildings listed on the National Register of Historic Places.

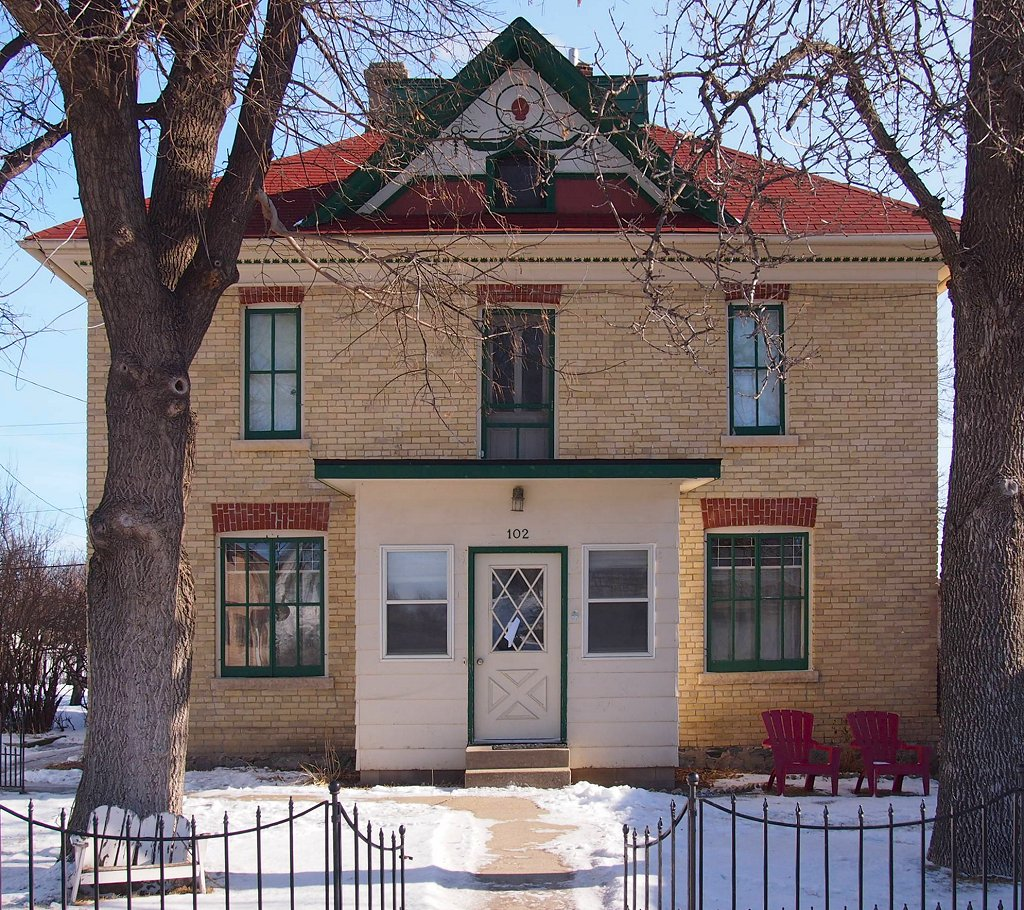
Paul Mohrbacher House (1880), home of the city's founder

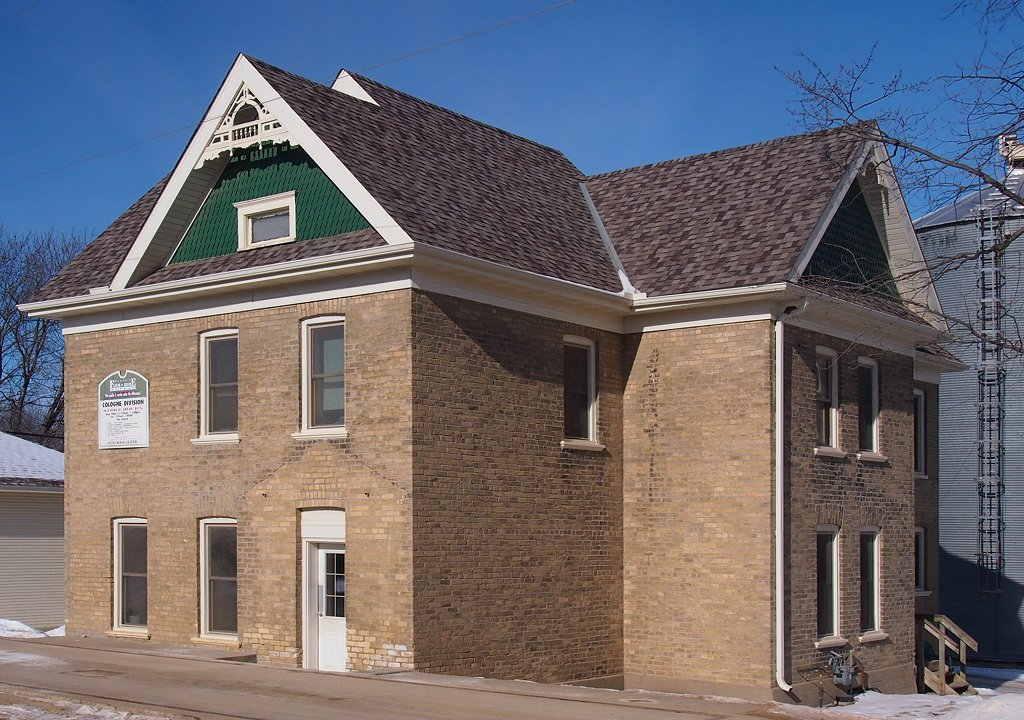
Philip Guettler House (1902)

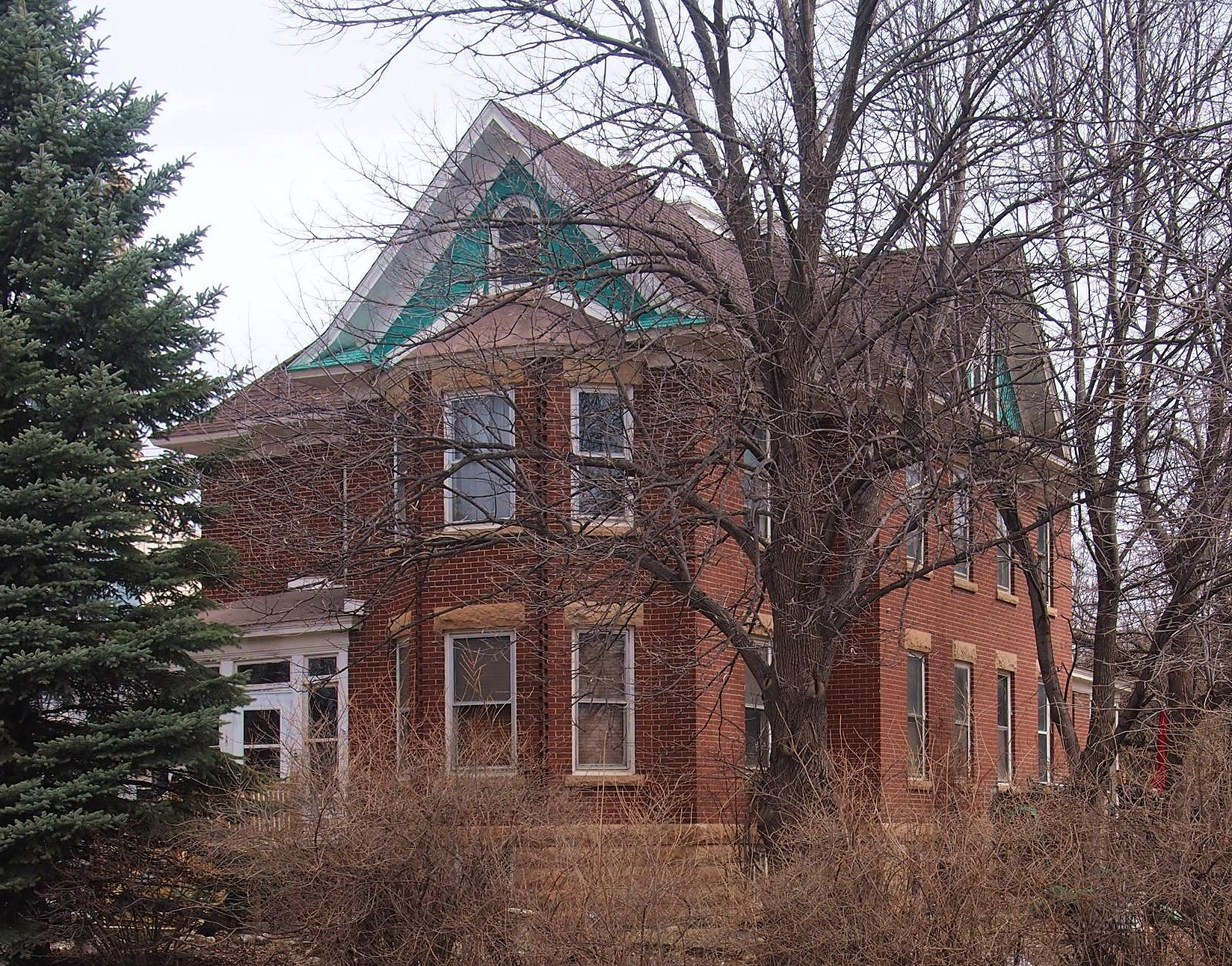
John Knotz House (1905)

== Parks and recreation ==
There are six parks located in Cologne: Marion Field, Meadow Park, VFW Park, Lions Park, Fritz Field and Village Park. Fritz Field is the home playing field of the amateur townball team Cologne Hollanders, a member of the Minnesota Amateur Baseball Association.
