= Morrison (surname) =

- Pronunciation: /ˈmɒrɪsən/
- Language: English, Scots

Origin
- Languages: 1. Middle English, Middle Scots; 2. Irish
- Origin: 1. moris + son 2. Ó Muirgheasáin
- Meaning: 1. 'son of Maurice'; 2. 'descendant of Muirgheas'

The etymology of the surname Morrison is either Anglo-Norman, commonly found throughout Scotland, Ireland and England, or from an Anglicization of Irish Ó Muirgheasáin.

== History ==
Morrison in England is traditionally believed to be a patronymic of Maurice/Morris, introduced into England following the Norman invasion in 1066.

In Scotland there is strong evidence that other surnames of Anglo Norman origin such as Moir, Muir and More, were equally influential as potential multiple origin points for the derivative of the modern spelling of Morrison. This is supported by evidence including the association of Moor or Saracen head(s) on some Moor, Moore, More, Mores, Morrison, Mure and Muir family crests. While the Highland Clan Morrison derives from Mac Ghille Mhoire, or servants of Mary, the lowland Clan Morrison Society of Scotland, registered their arms featuring three Moor heads in 1919, demonstrating the symbolic similarity between all these families.

Historical evidence suggests many early surnames in Scotland were nuanced and altered by such simple devices as phonetic interpretations by religious scribes. For example, Scottish records identify a marriage in 1584 between George Morese and Babara Forguson in Aberdeen. Later in other Aberdeen records their names become George Moreson and Barbara Ferguson, then George Morrison and Barbara Ferguson. Similar Morrison name evolutions are recorded in Edinburgh at this time. Those from the Clan Morrison may originally have been anglicised to Morison, with Morrison becoming more widely used later on.

Another form of name changing came through rebranding of surnames. This occurred in Scotland for both convenience or necessity to disguise a Scottish Highland name, for example, McCoinnich describes the adoption of the name Morrison on the Isle of Lewis (Eilean Leòdhais) around 1640 by families formerly known as "McBrief" or "mac a’ Bhritheimh". Alexander Morison (Heraldry of the Clan MacGhille-mhuire) makes the statement that the name is from ancestors who were vassals or adherents of the jarls of More or Moeri in Norway.

Perhaps the earliest recording of the recognisable surname Morrison is found in the English Yorkshire Poll Tax records in 1379 for "Ricardus Morisson”. Some fifty years later in Scotland there is a Morrison recorded as "Arthuro Morison domino de Darleith" being a witness to the "Resignation by John MacRoger of Gleane MacKerne, in favour of John of Culquoune of Luss, of Gleane Mackecherne, etc. 7th February 1429". The spelling Morrison became more popular over Morisson and Morison later on.

Following the gradual introduction of surnames in England, Scotland and Ireland many names such as Mirryson, Mirrison, Morisson, Morisone, Morrieson, Morriceson, Morason, Moorison, Mooresone, Morisoun, Moresoun, Murison, Muirison, Murieson, Murrison, Muresoun, Muirsoun and no doubt many other phonetic synonyms or Anglicised adaptations evolved and were standardised to become Morrison, Morison or Murison. Such standardisation in Scotland came after 1854 when Lord Elcho (Francis Richard Chateris, 10th Earl of Weymss) finally succeeded in framing An Act to Provide for the Better Registration of Births, Deaths and Marriages in Scotland, 31 May 1854.

Overall there is a common inconsistency in the spelling of Morrison or Morison in many records throughout England, Scotland, and Ireland. There is no particular rule or convention that specifies which spelling should be used. Morrison and Morison families today are widely distributed across England, Scotland and Ireland and in many cases with no common genetic or family ancestry. Morison is typically the older spelling of ancestors of the Clan Morrison from Sutherland and the Eilean Leòdhais, with Morrison being the more commonly used now.

== Notable Morrisons ==
- A. B. Morrison (1878–1967), American college sports coach
- Adam Morrison (born 1984), American basketball player
- Agnes Morrison (1867–1934), British charity fund-raiser
- Aileen Morrison (born 1982), Irish triathlete
- Alan Morrison (general) (1927–2008), Major General in the Australian Army
- Alan Morrison (lawyer) (born 1938), American Supreme Court litigator, co-founder of Public Citizen
- Alan Morrison (organist), American musician
- Alan Morrison (poet) (born 1974), British poet
- Alan Morrison (racing driver) (born 1968), British race-car driver
- Alasdair Morrison (banker), Scottish banker
- Alasdair Morrison (politician), Scottish Labour Party politician
- Alastair Ardoch Morrison (1911–1998), Australian graphic artist and author
- Alex Morrison (Canadian Forces officer) (born 1941), former lieutenant colonel of the Canadian Forces
- Alexander Morrison (botanist) (1849–1913), born Scotland, Australian
- Alexander Morrison (headmaster) (1829–1903), born Scotland, Australian headmaster of Scotch College
- Alexander Morrison (judge) (1927–2012), British judge
- Alexander Morrison (politician) (1851–1930), Canadian Member of Parliament
- Alexander B. Morrison (1930–2018), Canadian scientist, academic, civil servant and leader in The Church of Jesus Christ of Latter-day Saints
- Alexandra Morrison, Canadian photographer
- Allan Morrison (trader), Canadian-American fur trader and politician active in Minnesota
- Andrew Morrison (disambiguation), several persons
- Angelia Lawrance Morrison Harris (1912–1983), First Lady of North Carolina
- Angus Morrison (minister), Moderator of the Church of Scotland
- Angus Morrison (pianist) (1902–1989), English pianist and teacher
- Angus James Morrison (1900–1952), Canadian politician
- Arthur Morrison (1863–1945), English author and journalist
- Barb Morrison (born 1967), American record producer
- Benjamin Morrison (born 2004), American football player
- Blake Morrison (born 1950), British poet and author
- Father Brian Morrison (1933–2009) Charity worker, Priest
- Brendan Morrison (born 1975), Canadian hockey player
- Bret Morrison (1912–1978), American actor
- Brooke Morrison (born 1979), Australian field hockey player
- Bruce Morrison (born 1944), American politician
- Bruce Morrison (cricketer) (1933–2025), New Zealand cricketer
- Cameron Morrison (1869–1953), American politician
- Charles Morrison (cricketer) (1883–1948), West Indian cricketer
- Charles Clayton Morrison (1874–1966), American Disciples of Christ minister
- Chick Morrison (1878–1924), American silent film actor
- Chris Morrison (disambiguation)
- Clinton Morrison (born 1979), Irish footballer
- Connie Morrison, American politician and businesswoman
- Daniel Morrison (disambiguation)
  - Dan Morrison (umpire), umpire in Major League Baseball
  - Dan Morrison (wrestler) (born 1974), American professional wrestler
  - Daniel Morrison, Royal New Zealand Ballet
  - Daniel Morrison, actor who played Chris Sharpe in Degrassi: The Next Generation
  - Danny Morrison (writer) (born 1953), Irish republican writer and activist
  - Danny Morrison (cricketer) (born 1966), New Zealand cricketer
  - Danny Morrison (sports executive), President of the Carolina Panthers
- David Morrison
  - Dave Morrison (footballer), footballer
  - David Morrison (Australian Army officer), Australian army officer
  - David Morrison (astrophysicist)
  - Dave Morrison (ice hockey) (born 1962), hockey player
  - Dave Morrison (poet)
  - Dave Morrison (soccer) (born 1957) American soccer player
- Deborah K. Morrison, American cell biologist
- deLesseps Story Morrison (1912–1964), Mayor of New Orleans, Louisiana 1946–1961
- deLesseps Morrison Jr. (1944–1996), Louisiana politician and son of deLesseps Story Morrison
- Des Morrison (boxer), Jamaican/British boxer of the 1970s and '80s
- Diana Morrison (born 1969), British actress
- Dorilus Morrison (1814–1898), American politician
- Dorothy Morrison, several people
- Ebony Morrison (born 1999), Liberian Olympic athlete
- Ella Henrietta Davidson Morrison (1851–1939), American philanthropist
- Ellis Morrison, American politician
- Emmett Morrison (1915–1993), American basketball player
- Eric Morrison-1956-, American architect
- Frances Morrison (1807–1898), British activist
- Francis Moryson (before 1628 – c. 1681), Virginia colonial politician
- Frank Morrison (disambiguation)
- Fynes Moryson (1566–1630), English traveller and writer
- Geanie Morrison (born 1950), American politician
- George Morrison (disambiguation), several people, including

- George Morrison (artist) (1919–2000), American artist
- George Morrison (documentary maker) (1922–2025), Irish filmmaker
- George Morrison (director, acting teacher) (1928–2014), at The New Actors Workshop
- George Morrison (ice hockey) (1948–2008), National Hockey League player
- George Morrison (Northern Ireland politician), of the Vanguard Progressive Unionist Party
- George Morrison (British politician) Member of Parliament for Combined Scottish Universities
- George D. Morrison (1890–1973), American actor better known as Pete Morrison
- George Ernest Morrison (1862–1920), Australian adventurer known as Chinese Morrison
- George F. Morrison (1867–1943), American electric executive
- George M. Morrison (born 1902, date of death unknown), lawyer and political figure in Nova Scotia, Canada
- George Pitt Morison (1861–1946), Australian painter and engraver
- George S. Morison (engineer) (1845–1903), American engineer and bridge designer
- George S. Morrison (diplomat) (c. 1830 – 1893), British diplomat
- George Stephen Morrison (1919–2008), U.S. Navy Admiral and father of The Doors singer Jim Morrison
- George W. Morrison (1809–1888), U.S. Representative from New Hampshire

- Grant Morrison (born 1960), Scottish comic book writer and artist
- Greg Morrison (born 1965), Canadian writer and composer
- Henry Morrison (cricketer) (1850–1913), New Zealand cricketer for Otago
- Henry C. Morrison (1871–1945), American educator
- Henry Clay Morrison (1857–1942), American evangelist and Asbury College president
- Henry Morrison Flagler (1830–1913), American industrialist
- Herbert Morrison (1888–1965), British politician
- Howard Morrison (1935–2009), New Zealand singer
- Hugh Morrison (Manitoba politician) (1892–1957), Progressive Conservative MP
- Hugh Morrison (UK politician) (1868–1931), British Conservative Party Member of Parliament
- Ian Morrison (disambiguation)
- Jacob Morrison (born 2003), American baseball player
- James Morrison (disambiguation)
- Jane Morrison, runaway slave and plaintiff in the 1857 case Morrison v. White
- Jason Morrison (disambiguation)
- Jeanette Morrison (1927–2004), birth name of Janet Leigh, American actress
- Jennifer Morrison (born 1979), American actress
- Jim Morrison (1943–1971), American singer-songwriter
- Joe Morrison (1937–1989), NFL football player
- John Morrison (disambiguation)
- Joseph Curran Morrison (1816–1885), lawyer, judge and political figure in Canada West
- Joseph G. Morrison (1871–1947), minister and general superintendent in the Church of the Nazarene
- Joseph Wanton Morrison (1783–1826), British soldier in the War of 1812
- Kayla Morrison (born 1996), American-Australian footballer
- Keith Morrison (born 1944), Canadian journalist
- Ken Morrison (1931–2017), English businessman
- Ken Morrison (producer) (born 1957), American television producer
- Kenny Morrison (born 1974), American actor
- Kerensia Morrison, Jamaican politician
- Kimberley Morrison (born 1987), British triathlete
- Kirk Morrison (born 1982), American football linebacker
- Kirk Morrison (poker player) (fl. since 1994), American poker player
- Lindy Morrison (born 1951), Australian musician
- Logan Morrison (born 1987), American baseball player
- Margaret Morrison (born 1960), American Painter
- Margaret Morrison (philosopher) (1954–2021), Canadian philosopher
- Marin Morrison (1990–2009), American Paralympic swimmer
- Marion Morrison (1907–1979), birth name of John Wayne, American actor
- Mark Morrison, R&B singer
- Mark Morrison (ice hockey b. 1963), Canadian
- Mark Morrison (ice hockey b. 1982), Northern Irishman
- Mark Coxon Morrison, Scottish rugby union footballer
- Matthew Morrison (born 1978), American actor
- Mateo Morrison, Dominican author
- Father Michael Morrison, Army chaplain
- Michael Morrison (actor) (1946–2006), American pornographic actor and director
- Michael Morrison (author) (born 1970), American author, software developer and toy inventor
- Michael Morrison (footballer), currently playing for Charlton Athletic
- Mike Morrison (ice hockey) (born 1979), American ice hockey player
- Mike Morrison (baseball) (1867–1955), American Major League Baseball pitcher
- Mike Morrison (basketball, born 1967), American basketball player
- Mike Morrison (basketball, born 1989), American basketball player
- Nancy Brysson Morrison (1903–1986), Scottish writer
- Nigel Morrison, Vanuatuan footballer
- Norman Morrison (1933–1965), American Vietnam War protester
- Patricia Morison (1915–2018), American actress
- Patricia Morrison (born 1962), American bass guitarist, singer and songwriter
- Patricia Kennealy-Morrison (1946–2021), American author
- Patrick W. Morrison (1866–1935), American lawyer, educator, and politician
- Paul Morrison (artist) (born 1966), English painter
- Paul Morrison (director) (born 1944), British film director & screenwriter
- Paul J. Morrison (born 1954), American politician and lawyer
- Peter Reed Morrison (1919–2019), American physiologist
- Phil Morrison (baseball), American baseball player for the Pittsburgh Pirates
- Phil Morrison (director) (born 1968), American movie director
- Phil Morrison (driver), British race driver
- Phil Morrison (yachts) (born 1946), British yacht designer
- Philip Morrison (1915–2005), American physicist involved with the Manhattan Project
- Philip J. Morrison (born 1950) American physicist at the University of Texas
- Piercy Morrison (1868–1936), English rugby union player
- Ravel Morrison (born 1993), English footballer
- Ray Morrison (1885–1982), American athlete and coach
- Reece Morrison (born 1945), American football player
- Sir Richard Morrison (1767–1849), Irish architect
- Richard Morrison (ambassador) (16th century), Edward VI's ambassador to Charles V
- Richard Morrison (Neighbours), fictional character from the soap opera Neighbours
- Richard James Morrison (1795–1874), English astrologer
- Richard T. Morrison, United States Tax Court judge
- Rob Morrison (journalist) (born 1968), American television journalist
- Rob Morrison (scientist) (born 1942), Australian zoological researcher and communicator
- Robbie Morrison, British comics writer
- Robert Morison (1620–1683), Scottish botanist
- Robert Morrison, 1st Baron Morrison (1881–1953), British Labour Party politician
- Robert Morrison (footballer), New Zealand international football player
- Robert Morrison (missionary) (1782–1834), first Protestant missionary to China in 1807
- Robert Morrison (Phi Delta Theta) (1822–1902), a founder of Phi Delta Theta fraternity
- Robert Morrison (rower) (1902–1980), British rower at the 1924 Summer Olympics
- Robert Morrison (soccer) (died 1952), Scottish American soccer half back
- Robert F. Morrison (c. 1840 – 1887), 13th Chief Justice of the Supreme Court of California
- Robert J. H. Morrison (born 1961), Canadian academic
- Ronald Hugh Morrieson (1922–1972), New Zealand writer
- Ross Morrison (1937–2025), New Zealand cricketer and tennis administrator
- Ruia Morrison (born 1936), tennis player from New Zealand
- Samuel Eliot Morison (1887–1976), American historian
- Sara Virginia Ecker Watts Morrison (1868–1950), First Lady of North Carolina
- Sara Morrison (born 1934), British politician
- Scott Morrison (born 1968), Australian politician
- Scott Morrison (basketball player), Canadian professional basketball player
- Scott Morrison (footballer) (born 1984), Scottish association football player
- Scott Morrison (journalist), Canadian sports writer
- Sean Morrison (beach volleyball)
- Sean Morrison (footballer)
- Sean J. Morrison, American biology professor
- Shelley Morrison (1936–2019), American actress
- Sid Morrison (1933–2026), American farmer and politician
- Sophia Morrison (1859–1917), Manx cultural activist, folklore collector and writer
- Sterling Morrison (1942–1995), American musician
- Steve Morison (born 1983), English born Welsh international footballer
- Steve Morrison (American football), Indianapolis Colt
- Steve Morrison (footballer), Scottish footballer
- Steve Morrison (radio personality), American radio DJ
- Stevie Morrison, British yachtsman
- Sunshine Sammy Morrison (1912–1989), American child actor, vaudevillean
- Terry Morrison (academic), Canadian academic
- Terry Morrison (politician), state legislator from Maine
- Temuera Morrison (born 1960), New Zealand actor
- Theodore Nevin Morrison (1850–1929), Episcopal Bishop in the United States
- Thomas Brash Morison (1868–1945), Scottish politician and judge
- Thomas David Morrison (1796–1856), Canadian doctor and politician
- Thomas Morrison (actor) (born 1983), English television actor
- Tom Morrison (baseball) (1869–1902), American baseball player
- Tom Morrison (footballer) (1904–1973), Scottish footballer
- Tommy Morrison (1969–2013), American boxer
- Tommy Morrison (footballer, born 1874) (1874–1940), Irish footballer
- Tommy Morrison (footballer born 1943), Scottish footballer
- Toni Morrison (1931–2019), American author, Nobel Prize winner
- Van Morrison (born 1945), Northern Irish singer/songwriter
- Walter Frederick Morrison (1920–2010), American inventor of the frisbee
- Walter "Junie" Morrison (1954–2017), American funk musician, member of the Ohio Players
- William Morrison (Alberta politician), former member of the Legislative Assembly of Alberta
- William Morrison (Australian politician) (1928–2013), Australian MHR
- William Morrison (businessman), founder of the Morrisons supermarket chain
- William Morrison (dentist), American dentist
- William Morrison (director), music video director and musician
- William Morrison, 1st Viscount Dunrossil (1893–1961), British politician and Governor General of Australia
- William Morrison (gardener), plant collector employed by Kew, 1824–39
- William Morrison (missionary), American missionary based in the Congo Free State
- William Morrison (trader), Canadian fur trader active in Minnesota
- William Morrison, born Joseph Samachson (1906–1980), biochemist and science-fiction writer
- Garth Morrison (1943–2013), Chief Scout of the United Kingdom and Overseas Territories
- William R. Morrison (Canadian historian) (born 1947)
- William Ralls Morrison, U.S. Representative from Illinois
- William Robert Morrison (1878–1947), Canadian politician and mayor of Hamilton, Ontario

== See also ==
- Morison (surname)
- Clan Morrison, a Scottish Highland clan of Lewis, Harris and Sutherland
- Dùn Èistean, traditionally a stronghold of the Clan Morrison of Lewis
- Viscount Dunrossil, a title in the United Kingdom Peerage
- Baron Morrison, a title in the United Kingdom Peerage
- Morrison-Bell Baronets, a Baronetage of the United Kingdom
- Durness, an area in Sutherland where Clan Morrisons live with their traditional allies, the Clan Mackay
- Ness, Lewis, an ancestral home of the Lewis Morrisons
- Gilmore, a sept name of Morrison/ Morison
- Gilhemoire, progenitor of the Scottish Clan Morrison, and half-brother to Leod
- Pabbay, Harris, traditionally a home of the Clan Morrison
- Barvas, site of a battle between the Morrisons and Macauleys of Lewis

== Bibliography ==
- Black, George F. (1946). The Surnames of Scotland: Their Origin, Meaning, and History, New York, The New York Public Library.
- Cameron, Anne. (2007). The Establishment of Civil Registration in Scotland, Cambridge, England, Historical Journal, 50 (2), pp 377–395.
- Fairbairn, James. (1905). Crests of the families of Great Britain and Ireland.
- Fraser, William (1869). The Chiefs of Colquhoun and their country, Vol 2, Edinburgh.
- Huntley, C. G., Marquis of. (1894). The records of Aboyne MCCXXX-MDCLXXXI, Printed for the New Spalding Club, Milne and Hutchison, Aberdeen.
- MacCoinnich, A. (2015). Dùn Èistean: the historical background, c. 1493 – c.1700. In: Barrowman, R.C. (ed.) Dùn Èistean, Ness: The Excavation of a Clan Stronghold. Acair Press, Stornoway.
- Moir, Alexander L. (1913). Moir Genealogy and Collateral Lines. Union Printing Co., Lowell, Massachusetts.
- Morrison, Alexander W, (2016). The Genealogy of the Morrison Origins in Scotland: A critical evaluation of the historical evidence for the origins of the Morrisons in Scotland, On Line, Academia.
- Morrison, L. A. (1880). The history of the Morison or Morrison family with most of the "Traditions of the Morrisons" (clan Mac Gillemhuire), heredity judges to 1880, A Williams and Co., Boston, Massachusetts.
- Munro, A. M. (1897). Memorials of the Aldermen, Provosts and Lord Provosts of Aberdeen 1272–1895, Aberdeen.
- Nelson, P and Hinson, C. (2001). Yorkshire: Some of the Subsidy Rolls (Poll Tax) for the year 1379, Yorkshire Archaeological and Topographical Journals, with the agreement of the Yorkshire Archaeological Society, Geniuk.
- Scotlands People, Church Registers – Old Parish Registers Banns and Marriages, FR3914, 120 202, Aberdeen.
- Trevor-Roper, H. (2014). The Invention of Scotland, Myth and History, Yale University Press, London.
