= David Morrison =

David or Dave Morrison may refer to:

- David Morrison (astrophysicist) (born 1940), American astrophysicist
- David Morrison (Australian Army officer) (born 1956), retired senior officer of the Australian Army
- David R. Morrison (author) (1941–2012), Scottish author, editor and painter
- David R. Morrison (mathematician) (born 1955), American mathematician
- Dave Morrison (soccer) (born 1957), American soccer player
- Dave Morrison (poet) (born 1959), American writer and poet
- Dave Morrison (runner) (born 1962), American runner, All-American for the Minnesota Golden Gophers track and field team
- Dave Morrison (ice hockey) (born 1962), ice hockey player
- Dave Morrison (footballer) (born 1974), English former professional footballer
- David Rush Morrison, American cinematographer
