= Alan Morrison =

Alan Morrison may refer to:

- Alan Morrison (poet) (born 1974), British poet
- Alan Morrison (organist), American musician
- Alan Morrison (lawyer), American Supreme Court litigator, co-founder of Public Citizen
- Alan Morrison (racing driver) (born 1971), British race-car driver
- Alan Morrison (general) (1927–2008), Major General in the Australian Army
- Alan Morrison (politician), member of the Indiana House of Representatives

== See also ==
- Allan Morrison (disambiguation)
