= Patrick W. Morrison =

American judge (1866–1935)

- Portrait of Morrison in 1935

Member of the Minnesota Senate from the 21st district
- In office January 5, 1931 – June 13, 1935
- Preceded by: Henry M. Arens
- Succeeded by: Arthur A. Hahn

Personal details
- Born: March 12, 1866 Sibley County, Minnesota, U.S.
- Died: June 13, 1935 (aged 69) Norwood, Minnesota, U.S.
- Party: Republican
- Spouse: Bridget A. Fahey (m. 1895)
- Children: 3
- Occupation: Lawyer

Patrick W. Morrison (March 12, 1866 – June 13, 1935) was an American lawyer, educator, and politician. He served as the county attorney of Carver County, Minnesota, from 1894 to 1902, and then served in the District Court of Minnesota from 1904 to 1917. He later served in the Minnesota Senate for the 21st district, which included Carver and Scott counties, from 1931 until his death in 1935.

== Early life ==
Patrick W. Morrison was born on March 12, 1866, in Sibley County, Minnesota. His father, Martin Morrison, was a veteran of the American Civil War. He attended rural school in his home district, along with the public schools of Belle Plaine and Sauk Centre. When he was 17 years old, Morrison taught at a country school near Henderson, Minnesota.

== Career ==
=== Early legislative run and legal career ===
Portrait of Morrison as it appeared in The Minneapolis Journal in 1902

After teaching, he read law at the office of W. H. Leeman, being admitted to the bar in 1891, soon after opening his own office in Norwood, Minnesota. He was elected the county attorney for Carver County in 1894 and held that office for eight years.

Morrison ran to represent Minnesota's 3rd congressional district as a Republican during the 1902 United States House of Representatives elections. In the lead-up to a crowded Republican primary field, The Minneapolis Journal described Morrison as a "formidable candidate" who would be "strong in Carver, Scott, and McLeod" counties. In the primary on September 16, 1902, Morrison finished in fifth place, totaling 1,700 votes, or a 14.16% share. Charles Russell Davis, the winner of the primary, would go on to win the general election.

In 1904, Morrison was elected to the district judge of Minnesota's eighth judicial district. He served two full terms. In 1914, Morrison ran for a vacant associate judge position on the Minnesota Supreme Court. He finished in fourth place with 29,283 votes, or 13.38% of all votes cast. Following his retirement from the district court in 1917, Morrison returned to private practice.

=== Senate career and death ===
Morrison contested the 1930 election for Minnesota Senate to represent the state's 21st district, which at the time consisted of Carver and Scott counties. Morrison and H. F. Lueders, also of Norwood, advanced to the general election. On November 4, 1930, Morrison was elected to the Senate with 51.79% of the vote, or 5,583 total votes.

In 1934, Morrison stood for re-election and faced Al H. Ruppert of Jordan. After the initial count of the ballots, Ruppert was declared the victor by 48 votes. In a recount, however, Morrison was declared the winner on December 4, 1934, by a margin of 67 votes.

During his second term, Morrison was known to be in ill health, including a weeklong stint in St. Joseph's Hospital in Saint Paul in March 1935. On June 13, 1935, after months of illness, Morrison died at his home in Norwood. He had collapsed during a legislative session during the spring and was absent for much of the latter part of his term.

== Personal life ==
Morrison married Bridget A. Fahey in Minneapolis in January 1895. Together, they had three kids: two sons and a daughter.

Preceded by Henry M. Arens	Member of the Minnesota Senate from the 21st district January 5, 1931 – June 13, 1935	Succeeded by Arthur A. Hahn
