= James Murison =

James Murison may refer to:

- James Murison (politician) (c. 1816–1885), member of the Legislative Council of the Parliament of the Cape of Good Hope
- James Murison (moderator) (c. 1705–1779), Scottish minister
- Sir James William Murison (1872–1945), Scottish colonial judge

== See also ==
- James Morrison (disambiguation)
