= Allan Morrison =

Allan Morrison may refer to:

- Allan Morrison (footballer)
- Allan Morrison (fur trader)

== See also ==
- Alan Morrison (disambiguation)
