= Daniel Morrison =

Daniel Morrison may refer to:

- Dan Morrison (sailor) (1931–1993), sailor for the United States Virgin Islands
- Dan Morrison (umpire) (1948–2023), umpire in Major League Baseball
- Dan Morrison (wrestler) (born 1974), American professional wrestler
- Daniel Morrison (dancer), dancer with the Royal New Zealand Ballet
- Danny Morrison (cricketer) (born 1966), New Zealand cricketer
- Danny Morrison (Irish republican) (born 1953), Irish republican writer and activist
- Danny Morrison (sports executive), president of the Carolina Panthers
- Daniel Morrison, actor who played Chris Sharpe in Degrassi: The Next Generation
