= Agnes Morrison =

Agnes Brysson Morrison CBE (1867-1934, née Inglis) was a Scotswoman who is credited with inventing "flag days" when small flags or badges, usually of paper, are given in exchange for donations to charity collections.

== Charitable work ==
Morrison's first recorded collection was in 1900 when she raised money for the Fund for Sufferers in the South African War (the Boer war).

On 5 September 1914 she organised her first flag day, raising £3,800 in Scotland for Soldiers' and Sailors' Families Association one month after the start of World War I. 3,600 volunteers sold small Union Jack flags, on pins, to be worn by the donors. It has been said that she raised £25 million before the end of the war. The Alexandra Rose Day had already, in 1912, raised money by the sale of artificial roses in exchange for charitable donations, so Morrison's flag day was not the first time that wearable tokens had been used in charitable collections.

A postcard was published by Maclure Macdonald &co of Glasgow, showing a portrait of Morrison surrounded by a display of flags, with the text:

SYMBOLS OF A NATION'S GENEROSITY: Representative collection of Flags, sold on various Flag Days, including specimens from Malta and Salonica, with Portrait of Mrs Arthur Morrison, the originator of the Flag-day movement - a means by which nearly £7,000,000 has been raised throughout the United Kingdome for War Charities

She was the President of the Glasgow Branch of the Scottish Children's League of Pity for "many years".

She was appointed CBE in 1920, cited as "Organizer of Collections for War Charities".

== Personal life ==
Morrison was born in 1867, daughter of a Glasgow lawyer. She married Arthur Mackie Morrison, an engineer, and they had six children including Agnes (1903-1986), who published novels and biographies as Nancy Brysson Morrison and as Christine Strathern. A source states that her husband was Lord Provost of Glasgow at the time of the 1914 collection, but the post was held in 1914 by Daniel Stevenson succeeded by Thomas Dunlop. She died in 1934.
