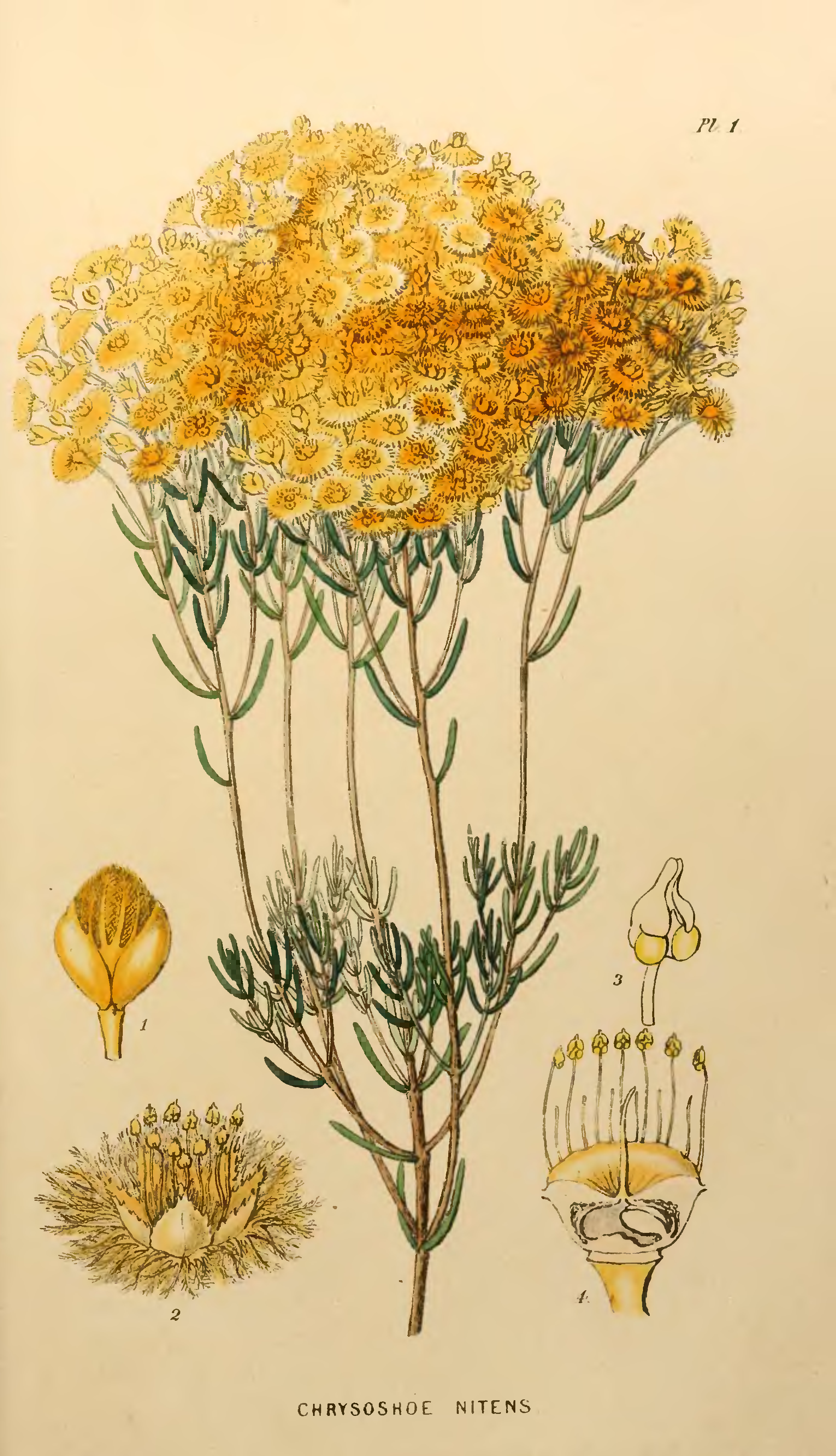
- Plate 1 from John Lindley's A Sketch of the Vegetation of the Swan River Colony: "Chrysorhoe nitens"

Scientific classification
- Kingdom: Plantae
- Clade: Tracheophytes
- Clade: Angiosperms
- Clade: Eudicots
- Clade: Rosids
- Order: Myrtales
- Family: Myrtaceae
- Genus: Verticordia
- Subgenus: Verticordia subg. Chrysoma
- Section: Verticordia sect. Chrysorhoe (Lindley) A.S.George

Type species
- Verticordia nitens

Species
- 3 species: see text.

= Verticordia sect. Chrysorhoe =

Group of shrubs

Verticordia sect. Chrysorhoe is a section that describes three shrub species in the genus Verticordia. The section is one of seven in the subgenus, Verticordia subg. Chrysoma. The three species in this section are inflexible, upright shrubs usually no taller than 2 m (7 ft). They have needle-like leaves and their flowers are arranged corymb-like, sometimes densely on the ends of the branches. The flowers are orange, gold-coloured or yellow and the petals have toothed margins, the anthers have a flattened, swollen appendage and the staminodes are narrow.

One of the three species in this section is Verticordia nitens which was first described by John Lindley in 1837. Lindley gave it the name Chrysorhoe nitens although the name was later changed to Verticordia nitens by Stephan Endlicher. When Alex George reviewed the genus in 1991, he described the section and gave it the name Chrysorhoe conserving Lindley's original name for the species.

The type species for this section is Verticordia nitens and the other two species are V. patens and V. aurea
