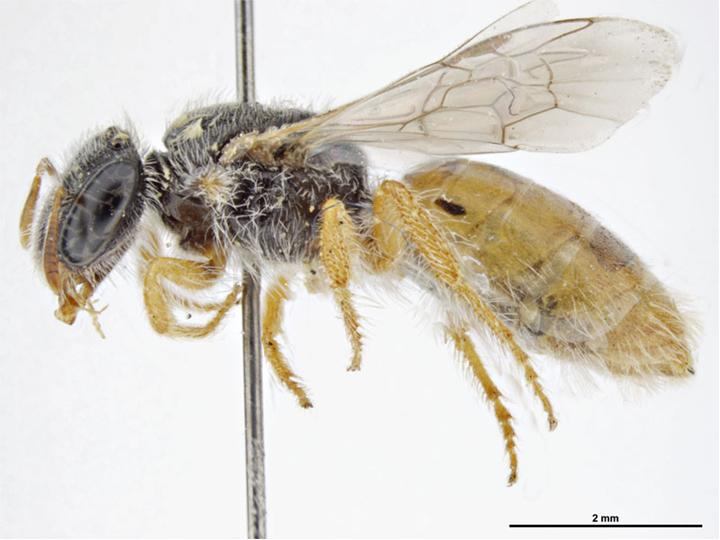
- Female

Scientific classification
- Kingdom: Animalia
- Phylum: Arthropoda
- Clade: Pancrustacea
- Class: Insecta
- Order: Hymenoptera
- Family: Colletidae
- Genus: Euhesma
- Species: E. morrisoni

Binomial name
- Euhesma morrisoni (Houston, 1992)

Synonyms
- Euryglossa (Euhesma) morrisoni Houston, 1992

= Euhesma morrisoni =

Species of bee

Euhesma morrisoni, or Euhesma (Euhesma) morrisoni, is a species of bee in the family Colletidae and the subfamily Euryglossinae. It is endemic to Australia. It was described in 1992 by Australian entomologist Terry Houston.

== Etymology ==
The specific epithet morrisoni refers to the species’ preference for the flowers of Verticordia nitens, commonly known as Christmas Morrison or Morrison featherflower.

== Description ==
Body length of females is 6.2 mm, that of males 4.3 mm. Colouration is mainly black, brown and dull orange-yellow.<

== Distribution and habitat ==
The species occurs in south-west Western Australia. The type locality is Melaleuca Park, 11 km north-east of Wanneroo.

== Behaviour ==
The adults are solitary flying mellivores. Flowering plants visited by the bees include Verticordia nitens .

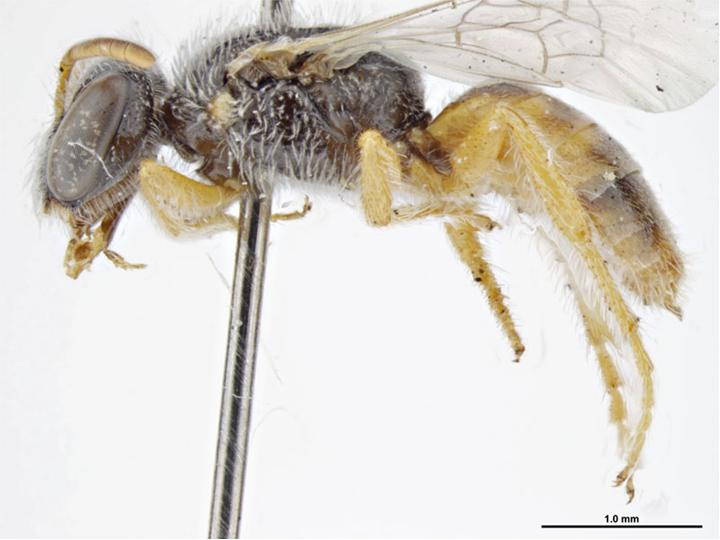
Male
