= Jason Morrison =

Jason Morrison may refer to:

- Jason Morrison (radio broadcaster) (born 1971), Australian talk radio announcer
- Jason Morrison (footballer) (born 1984), Jamaican footballer
