= Andrew Morrison =

Andrew Morrison may refer to:

- Andrew Morrison (Jesuit) (1919–2004), Guyanese Roman Catholic Jesuit priest, journalist, and pro-democracy activist
- Andrew Morrison (cricketer) (born 1994), New Zealand cricketeer
- Andy Morrison (Andrew Charles Morrison, born 1970), Scottish football manager and former footballer
- Andrew Morrison (filmmaker), American film producer

== See also ==
- Andrew Amers-Morrison (born 1970), British association football coach
