= Ian Morrison =

Ian or Iain Morrison may refer to:

- Ian Morrison (journalist) (1913–1950), Australian journalist
- Ian Morrison (footballer) (born 1954), Australian rules footballer
- Scotty Morrison (Ian Morrison, born 1930), former National Hockey League referee and vice president
- Ian Beausoleil-Morrison, associate professor of mechanical and aerospace engineering
- Ian Morrison (RNZAF officer) (1914–1997), senior officer of the Royal New Zealand Air Force
- Iain Morrison (rugby league) (born 1983), rugby league footballer
- Iain Morrison (musician), Scottish musician
- Iain Morrison (rugby union) (born 1962), Scottish rugby union player
