= Chris Morrison =

Chris, Christopher or Christine Morrison may refer to:

== Chris ==
- Chris Morrison, author of webcomic Polymer City Chronicles
- Chris Morrison, manager of the English rock band Blur
- Chris Morrison, lead guitarist of the American pop band Allstar Weekend
- Chris Tuatara-Morrison (born 1986), Australian rugby footballer

== Christine ==
- Christine Morrison Elementary School, School District 75 Mission, Fraser Valley, B.C., Canada
- Christine Morrison, who donated the SUNY Orange building Webb Horton House
- Sally Morrison (philanthropist) (Sally Christine Morrison), New Zealand businesswoman and philanthropist

== Christopher ==
- Christopher Morrison, British-American writer-director
- Christopher Morrison (athlete), Jamaican athlete at the 1998 Central American and Caribbean Junior Championships in Athletics
- Christopher Morrison, a fictional character from UK medical drama TV show Staying Alive
