= Jim Morrison (coach) =

American sports coach, athletic director, and educator (1898–1951)

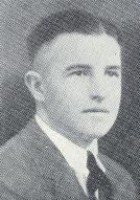

Biographical details
- Born: October 5, 1898; Sioux City, Iowa, U.S.
- Died: July 13, 1951 (aged 52); Wayne, Nebraska, U.S.

Playing career

Football
- 1920–1921: Iowa State

Baseball
- c. 1920: Iowa State
- Positions: Guard (football); Outfielder, pitcher (baseball)

Coaching career (HC unless noted)

Football
- 1922–1923: Cresco HS (IA)
- 1924: Bismarck HS (ND)
- 1925–1935: Valley City State
- 1936: Northern Normal (assistant)
- 1938–1945: Wayne State (NE)

Basketball
- 1925–1936: Valley City State
- 1938–1942: Wayne State (NE)
- 1945–1946: Wayne State (NE)

Administrative career (AD unless noted)
- 1925–1936: Valley City State
- 1938–1946: Wayne State (NE)

Accomplishments and honors

Championships
- Football; 2 IAC (1926–1927); 1 NIAA (1938)

James H. Morrison (October 5, 1898 – July 13, 1951) was an American sports coach, athletic director, and educator who served as the head football, basketball, and track and field coach at Valley City State Teachers College—now known as Valley City State University—from 1925 to 1936.

== Early life and playing career ==
Morrison was born on October 5, 1898 in Sioux City, Iowa. He attended high school in Council Bluffs, Iowa, where played football as a center. Morrison then moved on to Iowa State College—now known as Iowa State University—where played as a guard on the Iowa State Cyclones football team, lettering in 1920 and 1921. He graduated from Iowa State in 1922.

== Coaching career ==
Morrison began his coaching and teaching career in 1922, at the high school in Cresco, Iowa. Two years later, he moved to Bismarck High School in Bismarck, North Dakota, to serve as athletic instructor, coach, and physics teacher.

In 1938, Morrison was appointed director of athletics and physical educational at Wayne State College in Wayne, Nebraska.

== Late life and death ==
Morrison died on July 13, 1951, in Wayne, Nebraska, after suffering from a stroke.

== Head coaching record ==
=== College football ===
Year	Team	Overall	Conference	Standing	Bowl/playoffs
Valley City State Vikings (Interstate Athletic Conference) (1925–1931)
1925	Valley City State				
1926	Valley City State			1st	
1927	Valley City State	6–2	6–0	1st	
1928	Valley City State	5–2	5–1	2nd	
1929	Valley City State				
1930	Valley City State	3–3	3–2	T–4th	
1931	Valley City State	0–7–1	0–4–1		
Valley City State Vikings (North Dakota Intercollegiate Athletic Conference) (1932–1936)
1932	Valley City State	1–5	1–5	7th	
1933	Valley City State	1–5	1–5	6th	
1934	Valley City State	2–2–1	2–2–1	T–3rd	
1935	Valley City State	4–2–1	3–2–1	3rd	
Valley City State:					
Wayne State Wildcats (Nebraska Intercollegiate Athletic Association) (1938–1942)
1938	Wayne State	3–5–1	2–0–1	T–1st	
1939	Wayne State	3–5–1	1–2	3rd	
1940	Wayne State	4–5–1	0–2–1	4th	
1941	Wayne State	4–2–2	1–1–1	T–2nd	
1942	Wayne State	4–1–2	0–1–1	4th	
Wayne State Wildcats (Independent) (1943–1945)
1943	No team—World War II				
1944	No team—World War II				
1945	Wayne State	6–1–1			
Wayne State:		24–19–8	4–6–4		
Total:					
National championship Conference title Conference division title or championship game berth
