= Verticordia patens =

Scientific classification
- Kingdom: Plantae
- Clade: Tracheophytes
- Clade: Angiosperms
- Clade: Eudicots
- Clade: Rosids
- Order: Myrtales
- Family: Myrtaceae
- Genus: Verticordia
- Subgenus: Verticordia subg. Chrysoma
- Section: Verticordia sect. Chrysorhoe
- Species: V. patens

Binomial name
- Verticordia patens A.S.George

Species of shrub

Verticordia patens is a flowering plant in the myrtle family, Myrtaceae and is endemic to the south-west of Western Australia. It is a shrub with linear, pointed leaves and faintly scented, pale yellow flowers in open heads on the ends of the branches. It is fairly common in a small area south of Badgingarra.

== Description ==
Verticordia patens is a slender, woody shrub which grows to a height of between 0.2 and 1.3 m (0.7 and 4 ft) and up to 0.6 mm (0.02 in) wide. The leaves are linear in shape, semi-circular in cross-section and 4–12 mm (0.2–0.5 in) long with a pointed end.

The flowers are faintly scented and arranged in fairly open, corymb-like groups on the ends of the branches on erect stalks 5–19 mm (0.2–0.7 in) long. The floral cup is about 1.0 mm (0.04 in) long, glabrous and slightly warty. The sepals are spreading, lemon-yellow, 2–3 mm (0.08–0.1 in) long, with between 5 and 7 feathery lobes and two hairy appendages. The petals are erect, pale yellow, about 2 mm (0.08 in) long and egg.shaped with a toothed margin. The style is 2–4 mm (0.08–0.2 in) long, straight and glabrous. Flowering time is from September to November.

== Taxonomy and naming ==
This species was first formally described by Alex George in 1966 and the description was published in Western Australian Naturalist. He collected the type specimen at Moore River. The specific epithet (patens) is a Latin word meaning "open" referring to the open branching habit of this species.

When he reviewed the genus in 1991, George placed this species in subgenus Chrysoma, section Chrysohoe along with V. nitens and V. nitens.

== Distribution and habitat ==
This verticordia occurs in a small area between Badgingarra, Coorow and Moore River. It usually grows in sand or gravelly soil, sometimes over laterite or loam, in heath, shrubland or low woodland.

== Conservation ==
Verticordia patens is classified as "not threatened" by the Western Australian Government Department of Parks and Wildlife. Although its range is limited, it is fairly common in that area, part of which includes a significant national park.

== Use in horticulture ==
It possible to propagate V. patens from cuttings but the plant has proven difficult to maintain in the garden due to its susceptibility to fungal disease.
