= Ken Morrison (producer) =

American songwriter

Ken Morrison (born January 17, 1957) is an American television producer and songwriter. He has produced more than 50 documentaries and television specials.

== Career ==
Morrison was the producer of the syndicated show, Front Runners, a weekly half-hour magazine show that originally aired on KOMO-TV in Seattle from 1986 to 1995. During its run, Front Runners received several regional Emmy Awards and won first place in the Chicago Film Festival, the New York Film Festival, and the Houston Film Festival. Morrison has won 41 Emmy awards and has been nominated for more than 100. In 1995 he produced an award-winning documentary on The Beatles and their producer, George Martin. For two years, Morrison produced the kids' TV show How 'Bout That hosted by Tim Noah. Morrison and Noah collaborated on 85 songs during the course of the program.

As a songwriter, Morrison has written songs that have been recorded and/or performed by Carmen Bradford, Tim Noah, Irene and Her Latin Jazz Band, Nikoleta Sekulovic (Spain), and Hattie St. John (Germany). Morrison's song "Lucky Me" (co-written with Mark Reiman) is featured in the film A Single Man. His music can also be heard in the blockbuster movies such as “Toy Story 4” (Tom Hanks, Tim Allen), Passengers (starring Jennifer Lawrence and Chris Pratt), The Bounty Hunter (Jennifer Aniston and Gerard Butler), The Meddler (Susan Sarandon and J.K. Simmons), The Immigrant (Joaquin Phoenix, Marion Cotillard, and Jeremy Renner), Army Of One (Nicolas Cage), A Tale Of Love and Darkness (Natalie Portman), Stonehearst Asylum (Kate Beckinsale and Ben Kingsley), Bad Words (Justin Bateman and Allison Janney), and more than 350 other feature films and TV shows. He has multiple songs in the Jerry Seinfeld show “Comedians In Cars Getting Coffee” including the Barack Obama episode.

He has appeared in the movies Bustin' Loose (1981) and Life or Something Like It (2002).

Morrison wrote the jingle for Car Pros, a group of car dealerships in Washington and California.
