= William Morrison (gardener) =

Scottish-born gardener and plant collector

William Morrison was a Scottish-born gardener and plant collector employed by Kew between 1824 and 1839.

Morrison made collections of botanical specimens in Trinidad, returning them to England for study at Kew Gardens. He accompanied James Stirling to the Swan River Colony and gathered material for the Proteaceae found in the same institution's herbarium.

Notices on Morrison's collections were published by Kew in 1880 and 1891,

"In founding Swan River Colony in 1828, Capt. Stirling, the Governor, took with him William Morrison, a gardener, who became a seed collector, and forwarded collections to this country for sale"

Morrison's name is associated with the common names of many verticordias, initially given to his early collection of Verticordia nitens. Morrison's featherflower was thought to have been named for Alexander Morrison, a Scottish surgeon of the colony, though it was shown by Rica Erickson that a Captain Seymour Meares, collecting for James Mangles, had used this label when he was unable to recall its scientific name.
