= Arthur A. Hahn =

American politician (1886–1959)

Arthur A. Hahn (May 23, 1886 – December 27, 1959) was an American businessman and politician.

Hohn was born in Mayer, Carver County, Minnesota and graduated from Hutchinson High School in Hutchinson, Minnesota. Hahn moved to Scott County, Minnesota in 1925. He lived in Belle Plaine, Minnesota with his wife and family. He was in the retail mercantile business. Hahn served on the Belle Plaine City Council. He also served in the Minnesota Senate from 1935 to 1942. He died in Belle Plaine, Minnesota.
