= Frank Morrison =

Frank Morrison may refer to:

- Frank Morrison (labor unionist) (1859–1949), Canadian leader of the American Federation of Labor
- Frank Morrison (illustrator) (born 1951), American illustrator
- Frank Morrison, character in Outnumbered
- Frank B. Morrison (1905–2004), American politician
- Frank B. Morrison Jr. (1937–2006), American jurist

== See also ==
- Francis Morrison (1845–1913), Medal of Honor recipient
- Frank Morison, pen name of English writer Albert Henry Ross (1881–1950)
