= Belle Plaine, Minnesota =

City in Minnesota, United States

- City
- W Main and N Meridian Streets
- Motto: "A City That Works"
- Location of the city of Belle Plaine within Scott County, Minnesota
- Coordinates: 44°37′08″N 93°45′51″W
- Country: United States
- State: Minnesota
- County: Scott

Area
  - Total: 6.18 sq mi (16.00 km^{2})
  - Land: 5.95 sq mi (15.42 km^{2})
  - Water: 0.22 sq mi (0.58 km^{2})
- Elevation: 863 ft (263 m)

Population (2020)
  - Total: 7,395
  - Estimate (2021): 7,396
  - Density: 1,242.1/sq mi (479.58/km^{2})
- Time zone: UTC-6 (CST)
  - Summer (DST): UTC-5 (CDT)
- ZIP code: 56011
- Area code: 952
- FIPS code: 27-04834
- GNIS feature ID: 2394113
- Website: www.belleplainemn.gov

Belle Plaine (/ˌbɛl ˈplaɪn/ BEL PLAYN) is a city in Scott County, Minnesota, United States. The population was 7,395 at the 2020 census.

== History ==
Minnesota Territorial Supreme Court Judge Andrew G. Chatfield selected the townsite of Belle Plaine in 1853 while traveling from Mendota to Traverse des Sioux to hold court, as it was a halfway marker on his usual path of travel. Chatfield chose to name the townsite Belle Plaine, which is French for "Beautiful Prairie."

From 1868 to 1974, Belle Plaine was incorporated as a borough, the only one in Minnesota. In 1974, it became a city.

In 1870, the Minnesota State Legislature passed "An act to aid in the development of the salt springs at Belle Plaine", which donated six pieces of state-owned salt land to a holding company under certain conditions, notably that a well be drilled at Belle Plaine. The funds put the company under great public scrutiny. A year later "An act to further aid the Belle Plaine Salt Company in the development of Salt Springs at Belle Plaine" passed.

== Geography ==
According to the United States Census Bureau, the city has an area of 6.11 square miles (15.82 km^{2}); 5.91 square miles (15.31 km^{2}) is land and 0.20 square miles (0.52 km^{2}) is water.

U.S. Highway 169 and Minnesota State Highway 25 are two of the main routes in the community. The U.S. Highway 169 corridor travels from the city of Virginia along the western edge of Mille Lacs Lake, through the western suburbs of Minneapolis, south through Belle Plaine and Mankato, and then into Iowa. It is a central route of travel and provides easy access to the Twin Cities and southern Minnesota.

Belle Plaine is along the Minnesota River, which flows northeast through town. A bridge crosses on the north side of town via Minnesota State Highway 25.

Belle Plaine is in the Minnesota River Valley, an area of considerable width in which a great river once ran after the glaciers receded that left Minnesota with so many lakes. The ancient river's banks are discernible as the slopes of the valley rise up on either side of the town.

== Demographics ==
Historical population
Census	Pop.	Note	%±
1870	497		—
1880	629		26.6%
1890	814		29.4%
1900	1,121		37.7%
1910	1,204		7.4%
1920	1,251		3.9%
1930	1,236		−1.2%
1940	1,407		13.8%
1950	1,708		21.4%
1960	1,931		13.1%
1970	2,328		20.6%
1980	2,754		18.3%
1990	3,149		14.3%
2000	3,789		20.3%
2010	6,661		75.8%
2020	7,395		11.0%
2021 (est.)	7,396		0.0%
U.S. Decennial Census; 2020 Census

=== 2020 census ===
As of the 2020 census, Belle Plaine had a population of 7,395. The median age was 35.9 years. 28.9% of residents were under the age of 18 and 12.1% of residents were 65 years of age or older. For every 100 females there were 101.6 males, and for every 100 females age 18 and over there were 99.5 males age 18 and over.

95.5% of residents lived in urban areas, while 4.5% lived in rural areas.

There were 2,630 households in Belle Plaine, of which 39.3% had children under the age of 18 living in them. Of all households, 54.9% were married-couple households, 16.5% were households with a male householder and no spouse or partner present, and 19.1% were households with a female householder and no spouse or partner present. About 23.0% of all households were made up of individuals and 8.2% had someone living alone who was 65 years of age or older.

There were 2,766 housing units, of which 4.9% were vacant. The homeowner vacancy rate was 1.6% and the rental vacancy rate was 7.2%.

Racial composition as of the 2020 census
Race	Number	Percent
White	6,535	88.4%
Black or African American	152	2.1%
American Indian and Alaska Native	52	0.7%
Asian	87	1.2%
Native Hawaiian and Other Pacific Islander	2	0.0%
Some other race	155	2.1%
Two or more races	412	5.6%
Hispanic or Latino (of any race)	367	5.0%

=== 2010 census ===
As of the census of 2010, there were 6,661 people, 2,362 households, and 1,680 families living in the city. The population density was 1,127.1 inhabitants per square mile (435.2/km^{2}). There were 2,501 housing units at an average density of 423.2 per square mile (163.4/km^{2}). The city's racial makeup was 94.2% White, 1.1% African American, 0.2% Native American, 1.4% Asian, 1.2% from other races, and 1.8% from two or more races. Hispanic or Latino of any race were 2.1% of the population.

There were 2,362 households, of which 43.6% had children under the age of 18 living with them, 56.9% were married couples living together, 8.5% had a female householder with no husband present, 5.8% had a male householder with no wife present, and 28.9% were non-families. 22.2% of all households were made up of individuals, and 7.7% had someone living alone who was 65 years of age or older. The average household size was 2.73 and the average family size was 3.22.

The median age in the city was 32.5 years. 30% of residents were under the age of 18; 6.2% were between the ages of 18 and 24; 34.1% were from 25 to 44; 18.8% were from 45 to 64; and 10.9% were 65 years of age or older. The gender makeup of the city was 49.6% male and 50.4% female.

=== 2000 census ===
As of the census of 2000, there were 3,789 people, 1,396 homes and 949 families living in the city. The population density was 932.7 inhabitants per square mile (360.1/km^{2}). There were 1,424 housing units at an average density of 350.5 per square mile (135.3/km^{2}). The city's racial makeup was 97.39% White, 0.13% African American, 0.40% Native American, 0.71% Asian, 0.45% from other races, and 0.92% from two or more races. Hispanic or Latino of any race were 1.13% of the population.

There were 1,396 households, of which 38.6% had children, 53.4% were married couples living together, 10.0% had a female householder with no husband present. 26.0% of all households were made up of individuals, and 11.5% had someone living alone who was 65 years of age or older. The average household size was 2.59 and the average family size was 3.13.

In the city, the population was spread out, with 28.1% under the age of 18, 7.3% from 18 to 24, 31.3% from 25 to 44, 17.1% from 45 to 64, and 16.2% who were 65 years of age or older. The median age was 35 years. For every 100 females, there were 97.8 males. For every 100 females age 18 and over, there were 93.1 males.

== Education ==
Belle Plaine Public Schools are part of the Belle Plaine Public School District. The district educates nearly 1,500 students from kindergarten through grade 12. There are two elementary schools, with Chatfield Elementary holding preschool and kindergarten through second grade, and Oakcrest Elementary holding third through sixth grade. Seventh through 12th grades are held at Belle Plaine Junior/Senior High School. Graduating classes from BPHS usually range from 100 to 120 students.

Trinity Lutheran School is a pre-K–grade 8 school of the Wisconsin Evangelical Lutheran Synod in Belle Plaine.

== Notable people ==
- Ryan Dungey, four-time AMA Supercross and four-time AMA Motocross Champion
- Arthur A. Hahn, Minnesota state senator and businessman
- Patrick J. Hessian, 16th Chief of Chaplains of the United States Army
- Beth Riesgraf, television actress
- Peter Roy, Minnesota state and territorial legislator and farmer

== Gallery ==
City Hall

Water tower

Public Library

Post Office

Fire Department
