= James Morrison =

James Morrison or Morison may refer to:

== Arts and entertainment ==
- Jim Morrison (James Douglas Morrison, 1943–1971), lead singer of the Doors
- James Morrison (Geordie songwriter) (1800–1830), Newcastle songwriter
- James W. Morrison (1888–1974), American actor in the 1911 film A Tale of Two Cities
- James Morrison (fiddler) (1891–1947), Irish fiddler
- James Morrison (artist) (1932–2020), Scottish artist, co-founder of the Glasgow Group of artists
- James Morrison (actor) (born 1954), American actor
- James Neil Morrison (born 1960), aka Jim Bob, English guitarist and member of Carter USM
- James Morrison (jazz musician) (born 1962), Australian jazz musician
- James Morrison (singer) (born 1984), English singer and songwriter
- Jamie Morrison (born 1984), British rock drummer in Stereophonics, Noisettes
- Jim Morrison, host of American talk show For & Against

== Politics and law ==
- James Morrison (businessman) (1789–1857), British businessman and politician
- James L. D. Morrison (1816–1888), American politician from Illinois
- James Morrison (Western Australia) (1846–1927), Australian businessman and politician
- James B. Morrison (1846-1928), American politician and Sheriff
- James J. Morrison (1861–1936), Canadian farm leader
- James Morrison (British politician) (1873–1934), British landowner and MP for Nottingham East
- James H. Morrison (1908–2000), American politician from Louisiana
- James Morrison, 2nd Baron Margadale (1930–2003), British peer
- James Morrison (Kansas politician) (1942–2010), American politician from Kansas
- James Morrison (Indiana politician) (1796-1869), American politician from Indiana

== Religion ==
- James Morison (evangelical) (1816–1893), founder of the Scottish evangelical union
- James Dow Morrison (1844–1934), American episcopal bishop of Duluth
- James Morrison (bishop) (1861–1950), Canadian Roman Catholic bishop of the Diocese of Antigonish, Nova Scotia

== Science and medicine ==
- James Morison (physician) (1770–1840), British physician
- James Rutherford Morison (1853–1939), British surgeon
- Jim Morrison (chemist) (1924–2013), Scottish-born Australian physical chemist

== Sports ==
- James L. Morrison (fl. 1890s), American college football player and coach at Notre Dame, Hillsdale, Knox, and Illinois College
- James Morrison (American football) (1871–1939), American college football player and coach at TCU and VPI
- Jim Morrison (hurler) (1923–1994), Irish hurler
- Jim Morrison (coach) (1898–1951), American sports coach, head football coach at Valley City State University and Wayne State College
- Jim Morrison (ice hockey) (1931–2026), Canadian ice hockey player, coach and scout
- James Morrison (cricketer) (1936–2018), New Zealand cricketer
- J. J. Dillon (James Morrison, born 1942), American professional wrestler
- Jim Morrison (baseball) (born 1952), American Major League Baseball player
- James Morrison (golfer) (born 1985), English golfer
- James Morrison (footballer) (born 1986), Scottish pro footballer, West Bromwich Albion
- James Morrison (boxer) (born 1990), American boxer, son of late Tommy Morrison
- James Morrison (bowls), Scottish lawn bowls player
- Jim Morrison (mountaineer), American climber and skier

== Others ==
- James Morrison (mutineer) (1760–1807), British seaman and mutineer
- James M. Morrison (1805–1880), American banker
- James Augustus Cotter Morison (1832–1888), English essayist and historian
- James Morrison, Scottish founder of mobile phone firm i-mate

== See also ==
- Richard James Morrison (1795–1874), English astrologer
