= Danny Morrison (sports executive) =

American sports administrator

Danny Morrison is the executive director of the Charlotte Sports Foundation and Professor of Practice in the Department of Sport and Entertainment at the University of South Carolina, United States. He was previously the president of the Carolina Panthers and worked extensively in college sports administration.

Morrison was the athletic director at Wofford College from 1985 to 1997 and a senior vice president until 2001. As a student he played basketball for the Terriers. It was during his time as athletic director that the Panthers began holding training camp there. He was inducted into the Wofford College Athletic Hall of Fame in 2002. He served as commissioner of the Southern Conference from 2001 to 2005. From 2005 until September 2009, he was the athletic director of Texas Christian University.

He was named president of the Panthers in September 2008, replacing Mark Richardson, son of owner, Jerry Richardson.

In the 2015 season, Morrison's Panthers reached Super Bowl 50 on February 7, 2016. The Panthers fell to the Denver Broncos by a score of 24–10.

Morrison resigned from his position on February 9, 2017, stating "there are other endeavors, particularly on the college level, that interest me as a final chapter in my career."

On January 29, 2019 Morrison was named executive director of the Charlotte Sports Foundation effective May 1, 2019. CSF owns and operates the Duke's Mayo Classic, Duke's Mayo Bowl, Jumpman Invitational presented by Novant Health and serves as the local organizing committee for the Dr Pepper ACC Football Championship in Charlotte.

== Personal life ==
He is a native of Burlington, North Carolina. He played basketball for Wofford College for four years. He has degrees from Wofford (B.A. Mathematics, summa cum laude, Phi Beta Kappa), North Carolina (Master of Education), and University of South Carolina (Ph.D Educational Leadership).
