= Dave Morrison (ice hockey) =

Canadian ice hockey player (born 1962)

- Born: June 12, 1962 (age 64) Toronto, Ontario, Canada
- Height: 6 ft 0 in (183 cm)
- Weight: 190 lb (86 kg; 13 st 8 lb)
- Position: Right Wing
- Shot: Right
- Played for: Los Angeles Kings; Vancouver Canucks
- NHL draft: 34th overall, 1980; Los Angeles Kings
- Playing career: 1980–1999

David Stuart Morrison (born June 12, 1962) is a Canadian former professional ice hockey player who spent parts of four seasons in the National Hockey League with the Los Angeles Kings and Vancouver Canucks between 1980 and 1985 before embarking on a long playing career in various European leagues. He later became an executive with the Toronto Maple Leafs.

Morrison is the son of longtime NHL defender Jim Morrison, who appeared in three All-Star Games in the 1950s.

== Playing career ==
Morrison was born in Toronto, Ontario. As a youth, he played in the 1975 Quebec International Pee-Wee Hockey Tournament with a minor ice hockey team from Mississauga.

Morrison played his junior hockey for the Peterborough Petes and was selected in the second round, 34th overall, in the 1980 NHL entry draft by the Los Angeles Kings. He was the second Pete taken by the Kings, who had also drafted Morrison's junior teammate and future Hall of Famer Larry Murphy with their first selection.

Morrison spent two more seasons in Peterborough before turning pro, although his solid development saw him receive brief callups to the NHL in both the 1980–81 and 1981–82 seasons, appearing in a total of 7 games for the Kings. He was also selected to play for Canada in the 1982 World Junior Championships, where he helped his country win their first-ever Gold Medal in that tournament.

In 1982–83, Morrison turned pro and split the season between the Kings and the New Haven Nighthawks of the American Hockey League. He registered 3 goals and 6 points in 24 games in Los Angeles, and added a respectable 23 goals in 59 games on the farm. However, after a slow start to the 1983–84 season, Morrison was released by the Kings and was signed by the Vancouver Canucks. Morrison spent the majority of two seasons playing in the minors in Vancouver's system, playing just 8 games for the club in the 1984–85 season without scoring a point.

Following his release by the Canucks in 1985, Morrison signed on with a German club and would spend the next 14 seasons playing in leagues in Germany, Switzerland, the Netherlands, and Britain. His most successful stint was with the Kassel Huskies of the DEL, where he served as team captain from 1994 through 1997. He also served as captain of the Manchester Storm in England from 1997 until 1999.

Morrison retired as a player in 1999 to take a job as a scout with the Vancouver Canucks. In his career, he appeared in 39 NHL games, recording 3 goals and 3 assists for 6 points along with 4 penalty minutes.

== Scouting career ==
Morrison was hired by the Vancouver Canucks as an amateur scout in 1999 and served in that position until 2004. He joined the Toronto Maple Leafs as an amateur scout in 2004 and served in that role for the team until 2006, when he was promoted to Director of Amateur Scouting. On July 28, 2015, the Leafs announced that Morrison had changed jobs from Director of Amateur Scouting to Director of Pro Scouting, which he held for two years before becoming Director of Player Personnel.

== Career statistics ==
=== Regular season and playoffs ===
			Regular season					Playoffs
Season	Team	League	GP	G	A	Pts	PIM	GP	G	A	Pts	PIM
1978–79	Markham Waxers	OPJHL	48	13	25	38	27	—	—	—	—	—
1979–80	Peterborough Petes	OMJHL	48	18	19	37	35	—	—	—	—	—
1980–81	Los Angeles Kings	NHL	3	0	0	0	0	—	—	—	—	—
1980–81	Peterborough Petes	OHL	62	44	53	97	71	5	0	3	3	11
1981–82	Los Angeles Kings	NHL	4	0	0	0	0	—	—	—	—	—
1981–82	New Haven Nighthawks	AHL	2	0	0	0	2	3	1	1	2	0
1981–82	Peterborough Petes	OHL	53	33	31	64	38	9	6	6	12	27
1982–83	Los Angeles Kings	NHL	24	3	3	6	4	—	—	—	—	—
1982–83	New Haven Nighthawks	AHL	59	23	17	40	36	12	3	1	4	23
1983–84	New Haven Nighthawks	AHL	8	0	4	4	2	—	—	—	—	—
1983–84	Fredericton Express	AHL	68	14	19	33	51	7	2	4	6	0
1984–85	Vancouver Canucks	NHL	8	0	0	0	0	—	—	—	—	—
1984–85	Fredericton Express	AHL	69	21	28	49	50	6	3	4	7	0
1985–86	EV Stuttgart	GER-3	29	66	53	119	28	14	22	23	45	10
1986–87	EV Stuttgart	GER-3	26	95	85	180	20	14	32	27	59	6
1987–88	EV Stuttgart	GER-2	46	83	73	156	31	12	21	12	33	—
1988–89	SC Herisau	SUI-2	35	24	23	47	29	—	—	—	—	—
1989–90	EC Ratingen	GER-2	52	67	98	165	37	18	29	42	71	—
1990–91	EC Ratingen	GER-2	34	28	51	79	28	—	—	—	—	—
1991–92	EC Kassel	GER-2	43	59	45	104	24	—	—	—	—	—
1992–93	EC Kassel	GER-2	27	36	28	64	18	—	—	—	—	—
1992–93	Eisbären Berlin	GER	13	8	9	17	6	—	—	—	—	—
1993–94	Eisbären Berlin	GER	44	13	15	28	30	—	—	—	—	—
1994–95	Kassel Huskies	DEL	29	4	13	17	14	9	1	6	7	4
1995–96	Kassel Huskies	DEL	50	4	24	28	16	8	5	3	8	0
1996–97	Kassel Huskies	DEL	49	6	22	28	32	10	0	4	4	2
1997–98	Manchester Storm	BISL	36	5	26	31	10	9	4	2	6	0
1998–99	Manchester Storm	BISL	36	5	16	21	8	5	0	1	1	12
GER/DEL totals			185	35	83	118	98	35	7	22	29	12
NHL totals			39	3	3	6	4	—	—	—	—	—

=== International ===
Year	Team	Event	GP	G	A	Pts	PIM
1982	Canada	WJC	7	1	2	3	0
Junior totals			7	1	2	3	0
