= Dave Morrison (soccer) =

American soccer player

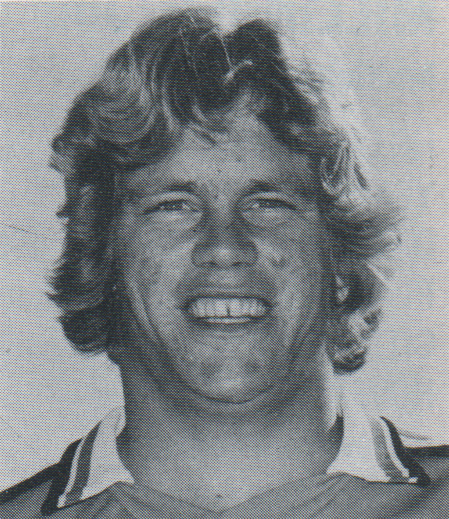
- Morrison in 1979

Personal information
- Date of birth: February 3, 1957 (age 69)
- Place of birth: Seattle, Washington, U.S.
- Height: 6 ft 0 in (1.83 m)
- Position: Goalkeeper

Youth career
- 1975–1978: Cal State Fullerton Titans

Senior career*
Years	Team	Apps	(Gls)
1979	Los Angeles Aztecs	1	(0)
1979–1980	Los Angeles Aztecs (indoor)	11	(0)
1980	Los Angeles Aztecs	5	(0)
1980–1981	Los Angeles Aztecs (indoor)	2	(0)
1982–1983	Garden Grove Galactica	1	(0)
- * Club domestic league appearances and goals

Dave Morrison (born February 3, 1957) is an American retired soccer goalkeeper who played professionally in the North American Soccer League (NASL) for the Los Angeles Aztecs.

== Early life and college career ==
Born in Seattle, Washington, Morrison grew up in Livermore and Fountain Valley, California.

Morrison played collegiate soccer for the Cal State Fullerton Titans from 1975 through 1978 in the division I Southern California Intercollegiate Soccer Association (SCISA) conference. He became one of the program's earliest players to advance to the professional ranks. During his time with the Titans, he was highly praised by head coach Dennis Checkett, who remarked that Morrison "could become the best goalkeeper ever to come out of California, he's that good." In late 1976, his collegiate success earned him a feature on the cover of the November/December issue of the university's sports magazine, ''titanSports''.

== Professional career ==
He signed with the Los Angeles Aztecs of the NASL in 1979 playing under legendary Dutch manager Rinus Michels until 1980. Primarily a backup goalkeeper, he appeared in limited action across outdoor and indoor seasons.

In 1979, he made one outdoor appearance (recording a shutout) and 11 indoor appearances. In 1980, he had five outdoor appearances and two indoor appearances and one assist.

A memorable professional moment came during the 1980 NASL postseason against the Edmonton Drillers. Michels substituted Morrison into the match specifically for the NASL's signature 35-yard breakaway shootout. Morrison made a critical save during the shootout, securing a crucial playoff victory for the Aztecs.

Overall, he recorded six outdoor league appearances and 13 indoor appearances with the Aztecs.

Morrison had a brief appearance with the Garden Grove Galactica in the Southern California Pro Soccer League during the 1982–83 season.

== Post-playing career ==
Morrison dedicated significant efforts to preserving the history of the North American Soccer League (NASL). In 2006, he launched nasljerseys.com, a comprehensive online archive featuring jerseys, rosters, photographs, team histories, and player profiles for every NASL club from 1968 to 1984.

== Career statistics ==
Year	League	Team	GP	Min	GA	GAA	SVS	CS
1979	NASL	Los Angeles Aztecs	1	—	0	—	0	1
1979–80	NASL Indoor	Los Angeles Aztecs	11	593	67	6.78	178	0
1980	NASL	Los Angeles Aztecs	5	—	5	—	0	2
1980–81	NASL Indoor	Los Angeles Aztecs	2	45	11	14.67	5	0
1982–83	SCPSL	Garden Grove Galactica	1	—	—	—	—	—
Total			20	638	83	7.81	183	3
