= Dave Morrison (poet) =

American writer and poet (born 1959)

David R. Morrison (born 1959) is an American writer and poet.

== Personal life ==
Morrison was born in 1959 in the Boston suburb of Reading, Massachusetts. As a young man he played guitar and sang in several rock & roll bands in Boston (the Trademarks and True Blue) and New York (the Juke Savages).

== Career ==
After attending the New School University in New York city he began to publish short stories and poetry in several literary magazines. Morrison has been included in the anthologies Tribute to Orpheus (Kearny Street Books), Riffing on Strings (Scribulus Press), What Happened to Us These Last Couple Years? (Elope Press), Agreeable Friends (Moon Pie Press), and his work has been published in Rattle, Opium, Wolf Moon Press, and other literary magazines. He has published two novels (Hideaway and Camaro), as well as seven poetry collections (Sweet, Brand New Day, Sliver, Lonely Life of Spies, Black Boat Black Water Black Sand, SIX and Clubland). Morrison was the host of the Have Poems Will Travel radio show originating from WRFR-FM in Rockland, Maine.

In 2011 Morrison released Clubland – Second Edition (published by Fighting Cock Press USA), an enlarged collection of poems about rock & roll bars, written in verse. Two of these poems were read on Writer's Almanac.
