= Alan Morrison (organist) =

Alan Morrison is an American organist, notable both for his performance career and his teaching. He is the head of the organ department at the Curtis Institute of Music, College Organist at Ursinus College, and Organist in Residence at Spivey Hall at Clayton State University in Morrow, Georgia.

At the start of his performance career he captured First Prize in two of the most prestigious national organ competitions, the Arthur Poister National Organ Playing Competition and the Clarence Mader National Organ Playing Competition, both in 1991 while still a student. After capturing the silver medal in the 1994 Calgary International Organ Festival & Competition his concert career was solidified with major engagements and eventual artist management with Karen McFarlane Artists, Inc. He has since played in most major venues throughout the United States, Canada, Europe, Russia and South America.

He has adjudicated numerous competitions including the 50th St. Albans Competition (UK), serving as the only American judge and recitalist. He has also appeared on two episodes of Mister Rogers' Neighborhood which aired in 1994. He is a champion of new music and specifically of American composers and regularly premiers their works. A graduate of both Curtis (BMus in Organ and MMus in Piano Accompanying) and Juilliard (Professional Studies in Organ), his teachers include Sarah Martin, John Weaver, Cherry Rhodes (organ), and Robert Harvey, Vladimir Sokoloff, and Susan Starr (piano).

== Recordings ==
- Florence Price - Virtuoso and Poet
- Celebration (25th Anniversary of Spivey Hall's Ruffatti organ)
- Paulus Organ Concerto #1 w/ Chamber Orchestra of Philadelphia
- OPUS 76 (Verizon Hall/Kimmel Center
- Cathedral Basilica of the Sacred Heart
- Alan Morrison at St. Luke's, Dunwoody, Georgia
- Organ Power
- St. Philip's Cathedral
- Live from Spivey Hall
- Festive Duo
- Alan Morrison at Church of the Epiphany, Miami
- American Voyage
