= Alan Morrison (poet) =

British poet (born 1974)

Alan Duncan Morrison (born 18 July 1974, Brighton) is a British poet.

== Overview of works ==
Morrison's work is influenced by poets including John Davidson and Harold Monro, and Anglo-Welsh poets Alun Lewis and Dylan Thomas. However, his earliest influences were John Keats, Wilfred Owen, William Blake, Andrew Marvell, Emily Brontë and Percy Shelley.

His poems are often characterised by social and polemical traits.

Morrison selected, edited and designed the Collected Poems of David Kessel, O the Windows of the Bookshop Must Be Broken.^{[6]} Between 2007 and 2012 he ran poetry workshops at Mill View psychiatric hospital, Hove. In 2008 he gained an NHS Artists' Award to produce an anthology of writing from the workshops (2009) from which he was then commissioned to write his own poetic response to this residency, resulting in his epic work Captive Dragons / The Shadow Thorns, published in October 2011.

His collection Blaze a Vanishing and The Tall Skies (Waterloo Press, 2013) was funded by an Arts Council Grant for the Arts Award.

In 2014, Morrison published parts of an epic polemical poem-in-progress, Odour of Devon Violet. The poem -attributed to 'Ivor Mortise', a fictitious alter-ego- satirises contemporary austerity culture using the leitmotiv of Devon Violet, a cheap perfume particularly popular during the 1930s and 1940s, as an olfactory metaphor for the retro-rhetoric, and synthetic nostalgia (a sort of austerity nostalgia or 'nosterity'/ 'austalgia', as Morrison refers to it) for a pre-welfare state Britain, promulgated by politicians.

In 2015, Lapwing Publications (Belfast) published Morrison's volume Shadows Waltz Haltingly. A deeply personal collection, it is a departure from his more socio-political poetry of recent years.

Tan Raptures - described by the Church Times as having "fluency, wit, and passion" was released in April 2017. Morrison describes the long title poem as an "Audenic dialectic" in verse; it is also a Socialist-Catholic polemic in opposition to the welfare regimen of ex-Secretary of the Department for Work and Pensions (DWP), Iain Duncan Smith.

Morrison is editor of left-wing international literary webzine, The Recusant, which he founded in 2007. In August 2010 Morrison compiled, contributed to and edited a collection of political poems entitled Emergency Verse - Poetry in Defence of the Welfare State (Caparison) endorsed by Caroline Lucas MP This was followed in 2012 by a second, significantly bigger anti-austerity anthology, The Robin Hood Book – Verse Versus Austerity (patron Mark Serwotka of the PCS Union). Morrison started up another polemical poetry site, Militant Thistles, in 2015.

In May 2021 the belated third anti-austerity anthology, The Brown Envelope Book (subtitled Poems and prose on experiences of unemployment, the benefits system, disability and work capability assessments) was published by Caparison, once more selected, edited and designed by Morrison (along with co-editor Kate Jay-R), featuring 107 poets, writers and disability activists. This anthology, patroned by John McArdle of the Black Triangle Campaign, had immediate impact, being mentioned by Labour MP Steve McCabe during a welfare debate in Parliament on 17 May 2021.

Morrison's poetry and monographs have appeared in journals including Culture Matters, Disability Arts Online, The Fortnightly Review, The International Times, The London Magazine, Long Poem Magazine, The Morning Star, Stand, and The Whistling Shade.

His poetry has been awarded grants from the Arts Council, and a John Masefield Memorial Trust Award from the Society of Authors. Morrison has been a recipient of a Royal Literary Fund grant since 2014.

Since January 2025 Morrison has been a co-poetry editor for The Morning Star.

== Poetry collections ==
- Poems – Don't Think of Tigers. The Do Not Press. 2001.
- Giving Light. Waterloo Press, Hove. 2003.
- Feed a Cold, Starve a Fever. Sixties Press, Surrey. 2004.
- Clocking-in for the Witching Hour. Sixties Press, Surrey. 2004.
- Picaresque, a play for voices. Survivors' Press, London. 2005.
- The Mansion Gardens. Paula Brown Publishing, Portsmouth. 2006.
- Picaresque – The Pirates of Circumstance. chipmunkapublishing, London. 2007–8.
- A Tapestry of Absent Sitters. Waterloo Press, Hove. 2009.
- Keir Hardie Street. Smokestack Books, Middlesbrough. 2010.
- Captive Dragons / The Shadow Thorns. Waterloo Press, Hove. 2011.
- Blaze a Vanishing/ The Tall Skies. Waterloo Press, Hove. Jan 2013.
- Blaze a Vanishing – Revisited. Caparison/World Literature Today (US) Nov 2013.
- Odour of Devon Violet. 2014.
- Shadows Waltz Haltingly. Lapwing Publications, Belfast. 2015.
- Tan Raptures. Smokestack Books/ Dufour Editions, Yorkshire/US. 2017.
- Shabbigentile. Culture Matters, Newcastle. 2019.
- Gum Arabic. Cyberwit, India/US. 2020.
- Anxious Corporals. Smokestack Books, Yorkshire. 2021.
- Green Hauntings - New & Selected Poems Volume One 2006-2016. Caparison, West Sussex. 2022.
- Wolves Come Grovelling. Culture Matters, Newcastle. 2023.
- Rag Argonauts. Caparison, West Sussex. 2024.
- The Alderbank Wade - a novel in verse. Culture Matters, Newcastle. 2025.
- English Laughter. Cyberwit, India/US. 2026.

== As editor ==
- Emergency Verse - Poetry in Defence of the Welfare State. Caparison. 2010/11.
- The Robin Hood Book - Verse Versus Austerity. Caparison. 2012 (co-editor with Angela Topping).
- The Brown Envelope Book. Caparison/ Culture Matters. 2021 (co-editor with Kate Jay-R).
- Out of Gaza - New Palestinian Poetry. Smokestack Books. 2024 (co-editor with Dr Atef Alshaer).
- The White Envelope Book. Caparison/Culture Matters. 2025 (ebook only).

== Commendations ==
- Shelley Memorial Poetry Competition 2022 (Highly Commended)
- Bread & Roses Poetry Award 2018 (Joint Winner)
