= Nancy Brysson Morrison =

Scottish writer (1903–1986)

- as pictured on her biography
- Born: Agnes Brysson Inglis Morrison; 24 December 1903; Glasgow, Scotland
- Died: 27 February 1986 (aged 82); London, England
- Occupation: writer
- Writing career
- Pen name: Christine Strathern; N. Brysson Morrison
- Genres: Novels and biographies

Agnes Morrison or Agnes Brysson Inglis Morrison; Nancy Morrison; Christine Strathern (24 December 1903 – 27 February 1986) was a Scottish writer. She wrote biographies, novels and some romantic fiction. Known for writing about Scottish history and for focusing on those usually lost to history.

== Life ==
Morrison was born in Glasgow in 1903 to Arthur Mackie Morrison, engineer, son of a Glasgow baillie, and Agnes Brysson Morrison CBE, née Inglis. Her mother invented the idea of a "Flag Day" - this is not a Flag Day in the American meaning of the phrase, but a day set aside to gather funds for worthy causes when each contributor is given a small paper flag to wear as evidence of their gift. Several of Morrison's siblings were authors too.

Morrison's first book was"Breakers, published under the androgynous name "N. Brysson Morrison".

Her third book was her most popular. The Gowk Storm told the life of three sisters with the youngest as the narrator. The Gowk Storm (1933) was a Book Society Choice. It sold well and was adapted for the radio.

Morrison also secretly wrote popular romantic fiction under the name "Christine Strathern". This was kept so secret that the link was not discovered until 30 years after her death.

Her 1949 novel The Winnowing Years won the first Frederick Niven Award.

A biography of Morrison was written and published in 2013 by Mary Seenan.

In 1971 Rick Wakeman bought a copy of The Private Life of Henry VIII by N. Brysson Morrison. Wakeman credits the book with inspiring his album The Six Wives of Henry VIII.

Morrison wrote several biographies, novels and some romantic fiction. She was known for writing about Scottish history and for focusing on those usually lost to history.

She died of cancer in St Mary's Hospital, London, on 27 February 1986. Her ashes are buried in her sister's grave in Ballater, Scotland.

== Works include ==
- Breakers (1930)
- The Gowk Storm (1933)
- When the Wind Blows (1937)
- The Winnowing Years (1949)
- The Hidden Fairing (1951)
- The Keeper of Time (1953)
- The Following Wind (1954)
- Mary, Queen of Scots, (1960) non-fiction
- Thea (1962)

== Critical review ==
"The Gowk Storm is one of the most atmospheric books I have ever read and the claustrophobia of the setting acts as a metaphor for the restrictions society places on these strong, intelligent and articulate young women. The symbolism of weather and the force of nature underpins the narrative. The weather is a character in itself, central to the main figures' lives; sometimes joyful, more often uncaring or malevolent, but always lovingly described and full of significance. What I love about the book is the detail; the way in which the author brings alive a character or place with economy and precision. The ferryman is 'a mere paring of a man', Christine Strathern's features are 'like a wax doll's which have melted ever so slightly at the fire'."
