= Young America =

Young America may refer to:

== Places ==
=== United States ===
- Young America, Indiana
- Young America, Wisconsin
- Norwood Young America, Minnesota
- Young America Township, Carver County, Minnesota
- Young America Township, Edgar County, Illinois
- Young America Lake, a lake in Minnesota

== Media ==
- Young America (1897 film), a short film
- Young America (1918 film), starring Madelyn Clare
- Young America (1932 film), starring Spencer Tracy
- Young America (1942 film), starring Jane Withers
- Young America (magazine)
- The Sound of Young America, now called Bullseye with Jesse Thorn, a public radio program

== Politics ==
- Young America movement, a political and cultural movement in the U.S. during the mid-nineteenth century
- Young America's Foundation, a 20th-century conservative group
- Young Americans for Freedom, a similarly named organization

== Other ==
- Young America Corporation, an engagement and promotional marketing company
- Young America (clipper), an 1853 clipper ship built by William Henry Webb
- Young America (1994 yacht) (USA–36), an America's Cup yacht sailed by Dennis Conner's team in the 1995 America's Cup
- Young America (1999 Farr yacht) (USA–53), an America's Cup yacht designed by Bruce Farr sailed in the 2000 Louis Vuitton Cup in Auckland, New Zealand
- Young America (1999 MacLane yacht) (USA–58), an America's Cup yacht designed by Bruce MacLane sailed in the 2000 Louis Vuitton Cup in Auckland, New Zealand
- Harrington & Richardson#Revolvers, Young America Revolvers

== See also ==
- Young Americans (disambiguation)
