= Hoeffken Lake =

Lake in Minnesota, United States

- Location within Minnesota Location within the United States
- Location: Carver County, Minnesota
- Coordinates: 44°44′33″N 93°52′43″W
- Type: lake
- Basin countries: United States
- Surface elevation: 955 ft (291 m)

Hoeffken Lake is a lake in Carver County, Minnesota, in the United States.

Hoeffken Lake was named for Henry Hoeffken, an early settler. Hoeffken Lake is situated southwest of Bongards, east of County Ditch Number Four A.

== See also ==
- List of lakes in Minnesota
