= Gotha, Minnesota =

Unincorporated community in Minnesota, US

Gotha
- Unincorporated community
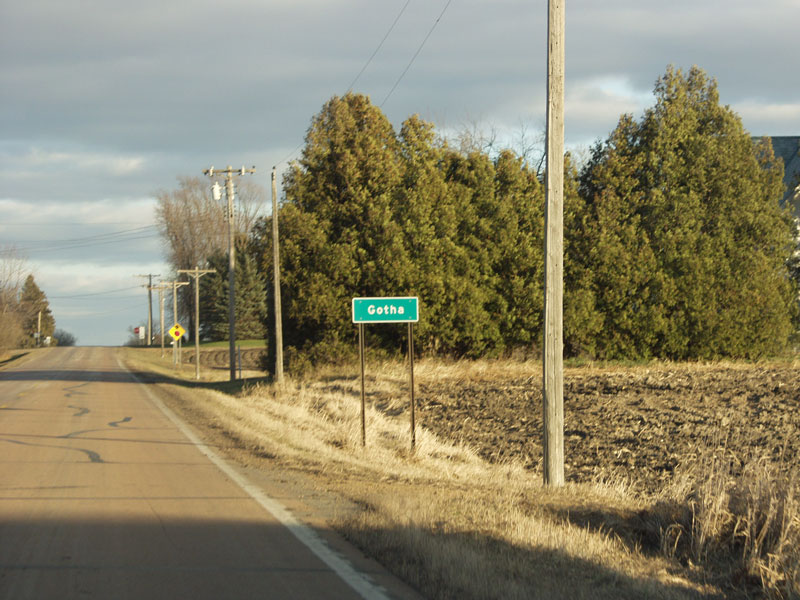
- Signpost for Gotha

- Location within Minnesota Location within the United States
- Coordinates: 44°43′02″N 93°47′19″W
- Country: United States
- State: Minnesota
- County: Carver
- Township: Benton Township and Hancock Township
- Elevation: 965 ft (294 m)
- Time zone: UTC-6 (Central (CST))
  - Summer (DST): UTC-5 (CDT)
- Area code: 952
- GNIS feature ID: 654729

Gotha is an unincorporated community in Carver County, Minnesota, United States. The community lies on the boundary line between Benton and Hancock Townships. Gotha is located four miles south of Cologne at the junction of Carver County Roads 50 and 53.

== History ==
A post office was established at Gotha in 1884, and remained in operation until it was discontinued in 1902. The community was named after Gotha, in Germany.
