= Stiftungsfest =

Festival in Minnesota, US

Coordinates: 44°46′59″N 93°54′56″W

Stiftungsfest is Minnesota's longest continually running festival, held in Norwood Young America, Minnesota, on the last full weekend of August every year. The first Stiftungsfest was held in 1861.

== Description ==
Founded in 1861, Stiftungsfest has its roots with Pioneer Maennerchor, a German men's singing group based in Carver County, Minnesota. The founder had a dream of leading a group of men singing in German, and he gathered the best male singers in the community who were willing to join him. The group sang in both English and German, traveling and participating in concerts, festivals, and contests.

Stiftungsfest was originally the picnic for choir members and their families. The members of the choir chose the name, which is German for "Founder's Day Festival." Eventually, attractions of the festival included not only music and dancing, but baseball games as well. Other German Minnesota towns offered special train service to the festival.

In 1868, the Pioneer Maennerchor built a Singer's Hall at the same park Stiftungsfest is held, with a big round table in the hall for card games. By 1911, interest in the singing group had waned, until they officially disbanded in 1938. The final members turned over their hall and the Stiftungsfest to the village of Young America, which in turn gave control of the festival to the fire department. When Young America and nearby Norwood merged, they maintained Stiftungsfest.

Modern additions to the festival include barbeque (added 1956), the Diedesfeld band from the Palatinate village Diedesfeld, Germany (subdistrict of Neustadt an der Weinstraße, first invited 1981), and a redesign of the park to look like an old German town. Every five years, they do a large parade. Over the now-four-day festival, Stiftungsfest attracts about 10,000 visitors yearly, and hosts one of Minnesota's largest softball tournaments. Today, the Stiftungsfest highlights the German heritage of the city. It features old-time and polka bands from across the United States and Germany as well as ethnic food.
