= Maple, Minnesota =

Unincorporated community in Minnesota, US

Maple
- Unincorporated community
- Location within Minnesota Location within the United States
- Coordinates: 44°52′54″N 93°48′57″W
- Country: United States
- State: Minnesota
- County: Carver
- Township: Waconia Township
- Elevation: 991 ft (302 m)
- Time zone: UTC-6 (Central (CST))
  - Summer (DST): UTC-5 (CDT)
- ZIP code: 55387
- Area code: 952
- GNIS feature ID: 654815

Maple is an unincorporated community in Waconia Township, Carver County, Minnesota, United States. The community is located along Carver County Road 10 near Mayer and Waconia.
