= Benton Township, Carver County, Minnesota =

Township in Minnesota, United States

Benton
- Township
- Location within the state of Minnesota Benton (the United States)
- Coordinates: 44°46′2″N 93°48′53″W
- Country: United States
- State: Minnesota
- County: Carver

Area
  - Total: 34.9 sq mi (90.3 km^{2})
  - Land: 34.0 sq mi (88.0 km^{2})
  - Water: 0.89 sq mi (2.3 km^{2})
- Elevation: 971 ft (296 m)

Population (2020)
  - Total: 753
- Time zone: UTC-6 (Central (CST))
  - Summer (DST): UTC-5 (CDT)
- FIPS code: 27-05266
- GNIS feature ID: 0663571

Benton Township is a rural township in Carver County, Minnesota, United States. The population was 753 as of the 2020 census.

== History ==
Benton Township was organized in 1858, and named for Thomas Hart Benton, a U.S. Senator from Missouri.

== Geography ==
According to the United States Census Bureau, the township has a total area of 34.9 square miles (90 km^{2}), of which 34.0 square miles (88 km^{2}) is land and 0.9 square miles (2.3 km^{2}) (2.58%) is water.

The city of Cologne is located entirely within the township geographically but is a separate entity.

Township 115 North, Range 25 West, Fifth Principal Meridian of the Public Land Survey System.

=== Lakes ===
- Bachman Lake
- Barlous Lake
- Hoefkin Lake (vast majority)
- Maria Lake (west three-quarters)
- Meuwissen Lake (west edge)
- Myers Lake
- Rice Lake (vast majority)
- Winkler Lake

=== Adjacent townships ===
- Waconia Township (north)
- Laketown Township (northeast)
- Dahlgren Township (east)
- San Francisco Township (southeast)
- Hancock Township (south)
- Washington Lake Township, Sibley County (southwest)
- Young America Township (west)
- Camden Township (northwest)

=== Unincorporated communities ===
- Bongards
- Gotha

=== Cemeteries ===
The township contains five cemeteries: Cologne United Methodist, Saint Bernard, Saint John's United Church of Christ, Snapsburg and Zion Lutheran Church.

=== Major highways ===
- U.S. Highway 212
- Minnesota State Highway 5

== Demographics ==
Historical population
Census	Pop.	Note	%±
1860	534		—
1870	1,297		142.9%
1880	1,262		−2.7%
1890	1,175		−6.9%
1900	1,191		1.4%
1910	1,194		0.3%
1920	1,158		−3.0%
1930	1,057		−8.7%
1940	1,016		−3.9%
1950	1,023		0.7%
1960	940		−8.1%
1970	987		5.0%
1980	939		−4.9%
1990	895		−4.7%
2000	939		4.9%
2010	786		−16.3%
2020	753		−4.2%
U.S. Decennial Census

As of the census of 2000, there were 939 people, 307 households, and 249 families residing in the township. The population density was 27.6 inhabitants per square mile (10.7/km^{2}). There were 311 housing units at an average density of 9.2/sq mi (3.5/km^{2}). The racial makeup of the township was 99.47% White, 0.11% Native American, 0.32% Asian, 0.11% from other races. Hispanic or Latino of any race were 0.53% of the population.

There were 307 households, out of which 38.8% had children under the age of 18 living with them, 72.6% were married couples living together, 4.2% had a female householder with no husband present, and 18.6% were non-families. 15.0% of all households were made up of individuals, and 6.5% had someone living alone who was 65 years of age or older. The average household size was 3.06 and the average family size was 3.43.

In the township the population was spread out, with 28.1% under the age of 18, 9.6% from 18 to 24, 26.6% from 25 to 44, 23.6% from 45 to 64, and 12.0% who were 65 years of age or older. The median age was 37 years. For every 100 females, there were 115.4 males. For every 100 females age 18 and over, there were 116.3 males.

The median income for a household in the township was $62,574, and the median income for a family was $63,839. Males had a median income of $38,173 versus $28,917 for females. The per capita income for the township was $22,652. About 1.2% of families and 2.6% of the population were below the poverty line, including 2.4% of those under age 18 and 8.8% of those age 65 or over.

== Government ==
Presidential election results

2020 Precinct Results Spreadsheet2016 Precinct Results Spreadsheet2012 Precinct Results Spreadsheet2008 Precinct Results Spreadsheet2004 Precinct Results Spreadsheet2000 Precinct Results Spreadsheet1996 Precinct Results1992 Precinct Results1988 Precinct Results1984 Precinct Results1980 Precinct Results1976 Precinct Results1968 Precinct Results1964 Precinct Results1960 Precinct Results
Year	Republican	Democratic	Third parties
2020	71.7% 367	27.0% 138	1.3% 7
2016	70.4% 335	23.5% 112	6.1% 29
2012	70.7% 353	27.3% 136	2.0% 10
2008	68.4% 338	29.2% 144	2.4% 12
2004	69.3% 355	30.1% 154	0.6% 3
2000	64.5% 316	27.1% 133	8.4% 41
1996	47.3% 228	38.2% 184	14.5% 70
1992	41.9% 198	24.6% 116	33.5% 158
1988	66.7% 295	33.3% 147	0.0% 0
1984	76.6% 361	23.4% 110	0.0% 0
1980	67.5% 318	24.6% 116	7.9% 37
1976	56.5% 269	41.8% 199	1.7% 8
1968	71.1% 323	24.0% 109	4.9% 22
1964	62.1% 279	37.9% 170	0.0% 0
1960	64.9% 286	35.1% 155	0.0% 0
