= Young America City Hall =

- U.S. National Register of Historic Places
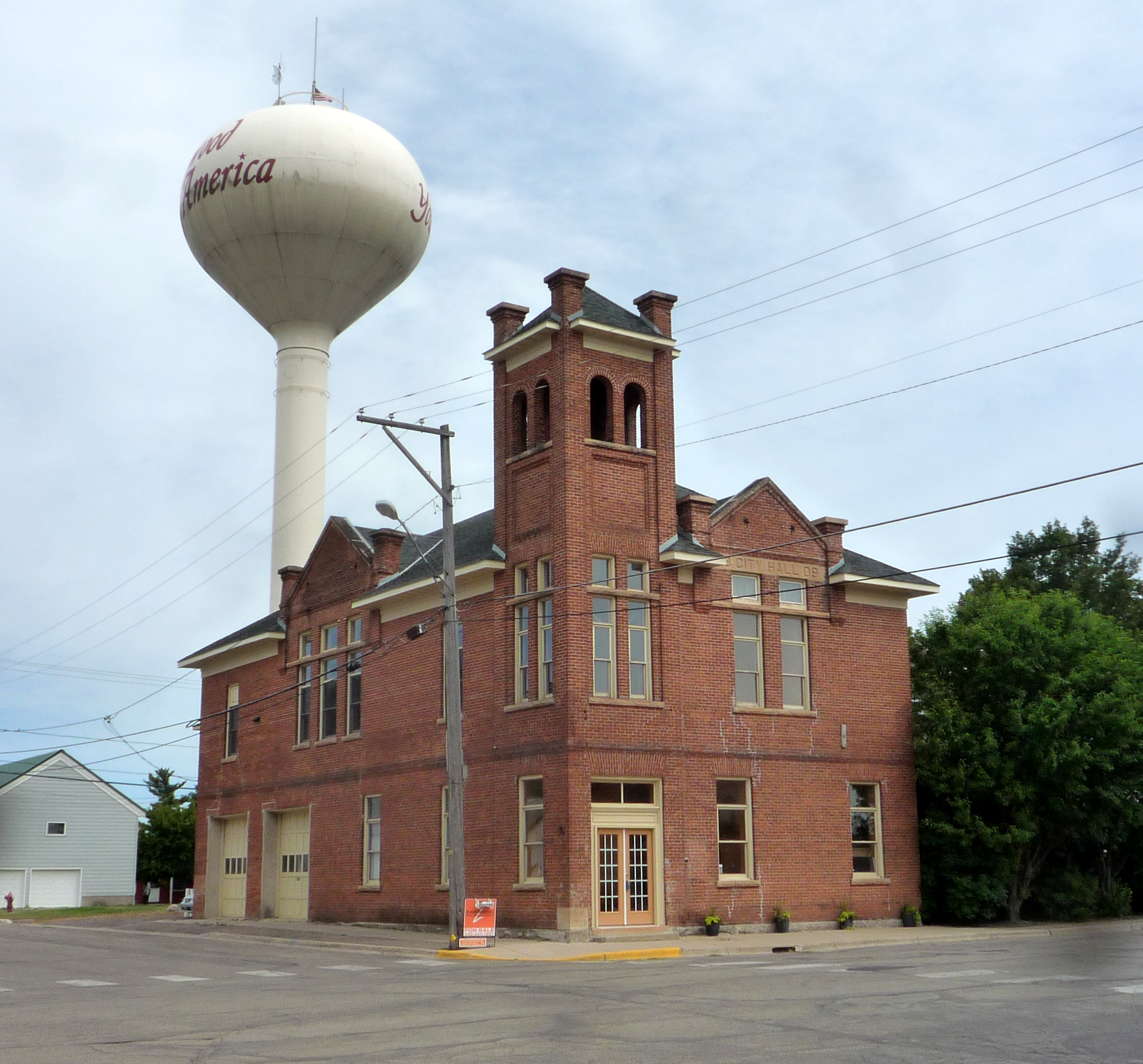

- Location within Minnesota Location within the United States
- Location: 102 2nd Ave., S., Norwood Young America, Minnesota
- Coordinates: 44°46′55″N 93°54′48″W
- Area: less than one acre
- Built: 1909
- MPS: Carver County MRA
- NRHP reference No.: 80001988
- Added to NRHP: January 4, 1980

Young America City Hall is a historic building in Norwood Young America, Minnesota, United States. It is currently a private residence. The building was placed on the National Register of Historic Places (NRHP) on January 4, 1980.

Built in 1909 for the city of Young America, which merged with the neighboring city of Norwood in 1997, it was converted into a single-family home by 2000.

The 4,000 square feet (370 m^{2}) structure retains its original bell tower, tin ceilings, ticket window as well as original hardwood floors in what was converted to a basketball court. The most recent owners planned to live on the second floor and convert the main floor into a youth center, but the plans fell through when they needed to move for work. In its present layout, the structure includes four bedrooms, kitchen, living room and formal dining room, all on the upper level, as well as four bathrooms. A partial loft was added which includes a library with a gas fireplace, a recreation room and recording studio.

In May 2010 the structure was being offered for sale at a price of $449,900.
