= Stieger Lake =

Lake in Minnesota, United States

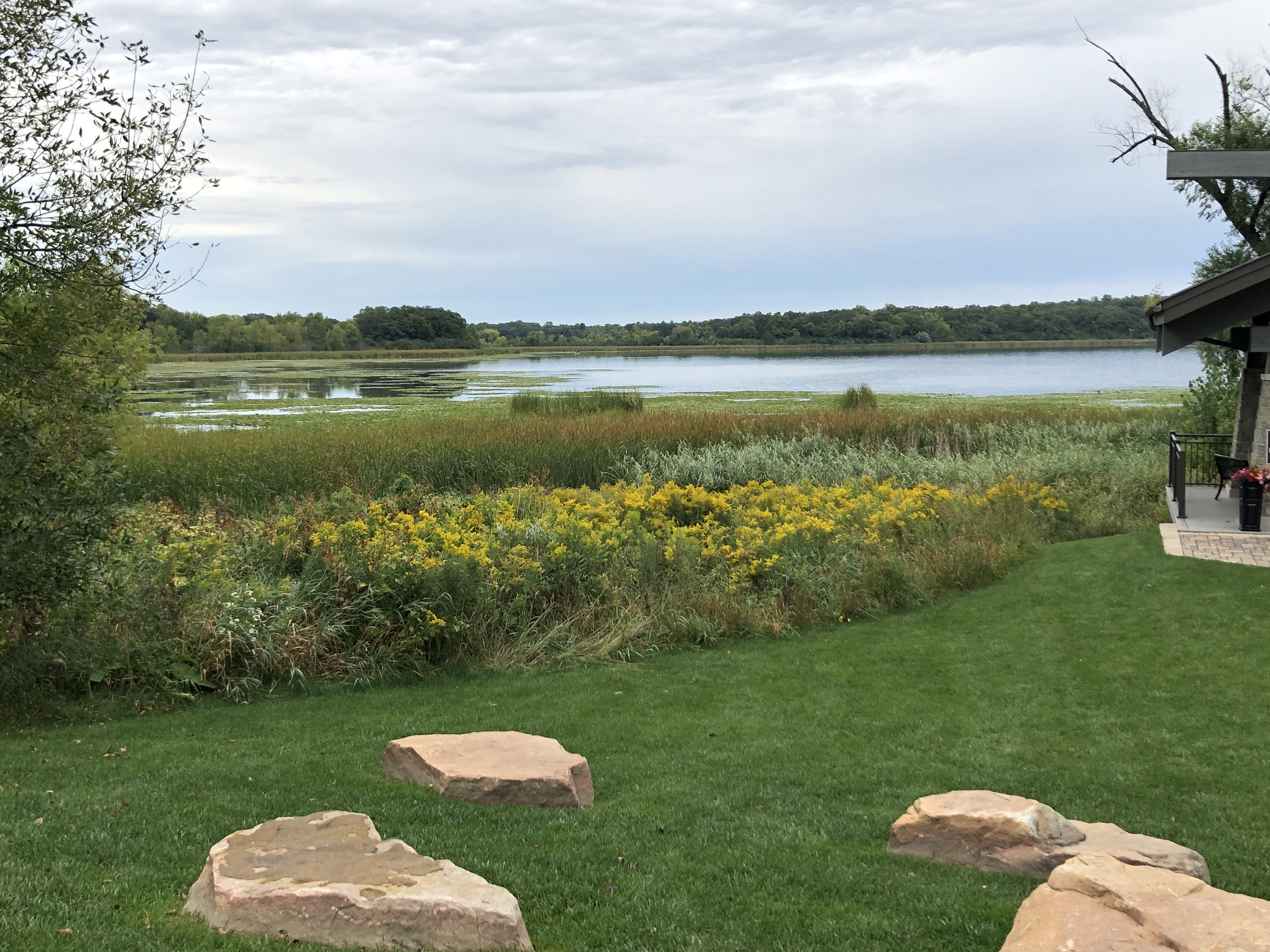
- Stieger Lake seen from Victoria

- Location within Minnesota
- Location: Carver County, Minnesota
- Coordinates: 44°52′1″N 93°39′33″W
- Type: lake

Stieger Lake or Steiger Lake is a lake in Carver County, Minnesota, in the United States.

Stieger Lake was named for Carl Stieger, an early settler.
