= Elkay Manufacturing =

American manufacturing company

Elkay Manufacturing Company
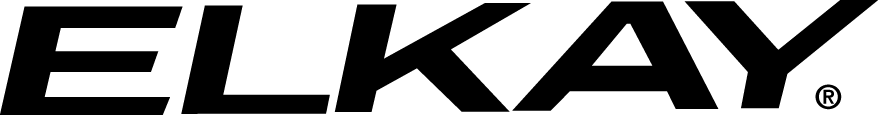
- Type: Subsidiary
- Industry: Plumbing fixtures manufacturing
- Founded: 1920; 106 years ago, in Chicago, U.S.
- Founders: Leopold Katz; Louis Katz
- Headquarters: Chicago, Illinois, U.S., United States
- Products: Plumbing fixtures; Foodservice fixtures; Branded Commercial Interiors; Water coolers; Drinking fountains; Smartwell Water Delivery Systems; Bottle filling stations
- Number of employees: 2,500
- Website: elkay.com

Elkay Manufacturing Company is an American manufacturer of stainless steel sinks, faucets, drinking fountains, bottle fillers and branded commercial interiors. The company was founded in 1920 by Leopold Katz, his son Louis, and Ellef Robarth, a tinsmith who came up with an idea to hand fabricate German silver sinks and deliver them in Chicago. In February 2022, Elkay was acquired by Zurn Water Solutions to form Zurn Elkay Water Solutions. Over the years the products Elkay manufactures have expanded to include sinks, faucets, water coolers, drinking fountains, water bottle fillers, and residential and commercial kitchen and bath products.

== History ==
The Elkay Manufacturing Company was founded in 1920 by Leopold Katz, his son Louis, and Ellef Robarth. The company's name was coined by combining the initial sounds of Robarth's first name and Katz's last name. During World War II, Elkay supplied sinks and commodes to equip the U.S. Military.

In 2009, Elkay launched the EZH2O Water Bottle Filler, which has been recognized for contributing to keeping plastic bottles out of landfills. The unique counter on the unit allowed for users to see how many bottles had been saved from landfills at a particular location. The EZH2O first came about when Elkay business travelers started noticing their fellow travelers at water fountains trying to tilt their plastic water bottles at the proper angle for refilling without splashing water on their shoes.

In 2013, Elkay Manufacturing won an international trade case involving anti-dumping and anti-subsidy petitions filed by the company and "unlawful pricing by Chinese producers of drawn stainless steel sinks, which caused material injury to ELKAY Manufacturing Company and other domestic producers."

Elkay acquired Interior Systems, Inc. in 2017. Interior Systems’ nationwide presence in the restaurant, education, hospitality, and retail markets was a natural fit when Elkay looked to expand business operations. Elkay Interior Systems later acquired competitors in China, Austria and Washington, DC.

It was announced in November 2018 that Elkay's Wood Products Division would be acquired by ACPI.

In October, 2019, Ric Phillips replaced Tim Jahnke as president and CEO. In March 2020, Elkay announced the retirement of Board Chairman Ron Katz. Former President and CEO Tim Jahnke was named as his successor.

In January 2020, the company celebrated its 100th anniversary.

In February 2022, Zurn Water Solutions announced they had reached a "definitive agreement to combine" with Elkay, in an all-stock transaction valued at $1.56 billion.

In 2025, Elkay announced the closure of its manufacturing plant in Savanna, Illinois, citing the cost of roof repairs and space limitations. The company planned to transfer 178 positions to its facilities in Lanark and Freeport, Illinois.

== Products ==
Elkay currently has four main product categories – Coolers; Sinks, Faucets and Accessories; Commercial Interior Design; Foodservice and Millwork. Their breadth of plumbing products includes 4,000 SKUs of kitchen sinks made of a variety of different materials. Elkay manufactures residential kitchen and commercial products, such as sinks, bars, faucets, cabinets and commercial kitchen appliances. They are the largest sink manufacturer in the world and the largest water cooler offering in the market.

== Divisions ==
Elkay Manufacturing has several divisions:

- Elkay Plumbing manufactures Elkay sinks, drinking fountains and coolers, LIV, EZH2O, water bottle filling stations, Smartwell water delivery systems, Halsey Taylor, and Revere sinks.
- Elkay Interior Systems provides turnkey commercial front of house interior design and build services for restaurants, hospitality and cafeteria environments
- Elkay Commercial Systems provides engineering, global sourcing, and back of house manufacturing in the restaurant, retail, and hospitality markets.

== Facilities ==
Elkay Manufacturing is based in Downers Grove, Illinois, with offices and distribution and manufacturing facilities across the United States and international operations in Mexico and China.

== Major competitors ==
- Blanco
- Ebac Ltd.
- Fortune Brands, Inc.
- Haws Corporation
- Kohler Co.
- Masco Corporation
- Native Trails
- OASIS International
- Primo Water Corporation
