= San Francisco, Minnesota =

Ghost town in Carver County, Minnesota, US

Coordinates: 44°41′52″N 93°42′08″W

San Francisco is an abandoned townsite in San Francisco Township in Carver County, Minnesota, United States.

== History ==
San Francisco was first settled in 1854 and named by the founder, William Foster, after the city in California. It was reportedly the original county seat of Carver County, Minnesota, but lost that status to Chaska a year later. The town lasted about ten years from its founding and had a post office from 1856 until 1858 and again from 1861 until 1862. It still existed as a town in 1870, as there is a U.S. federal census record for it.
