= Lake Zumbra =

Lake in the state of Minnesota, United States

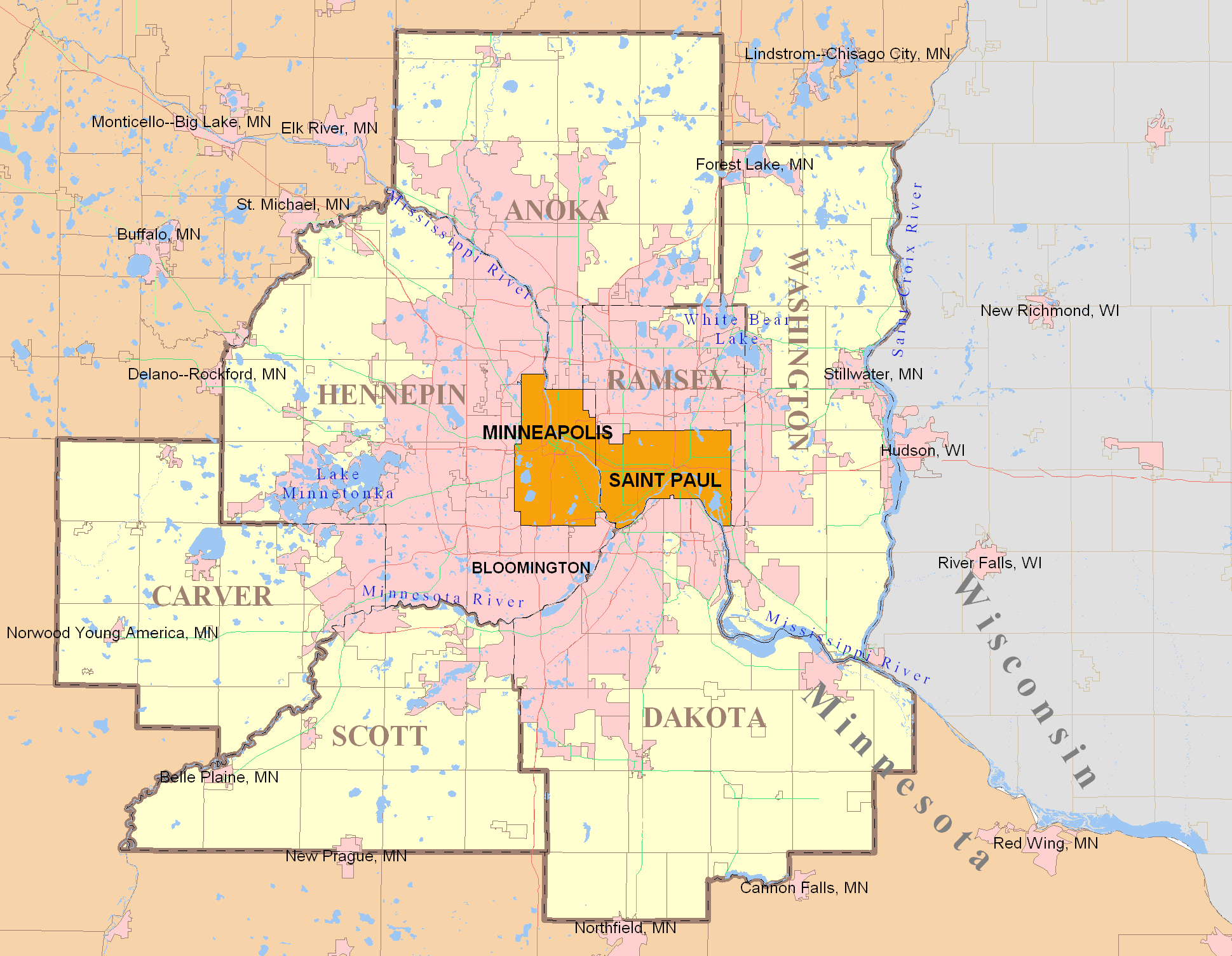
- Location in Minneapolis-St. Paul metro
- Interactive map of Lake Zumbra
- Location: Carver County, Minnesota
- Coordinates: 44.8811956°N 93.6649394°W
- Type: lake
- Primary outflows: Sunny Lake (part of the Zumbra-Sunny chain)
- Surface area: 271.13 acres (109.72 ha)
- Average depth: 14 feet (4.3 m)
- Max. depth: 58 feet (18 m)
- Shore length^{1}: 5.75 miles (9.25 km)
- Surface elevation: 952 feet (290 m)
- Settlements: Victoria, Minnesota
- ^{1} Shore length is not a well-defined measure.

Lake Zumbra is a lake in Carver County, Minnesota, in the United States. The lake is hydrologically connected to Sunny Lake, forming the Zumbra-Sunny chain.

The majority of the lake is situated within Carver Park Reserve, which is managed by the Three Rivers Park District. The shoreline is largely undeveloped due to the surrounding protected parkland. Public access is available via a park district boat launch and fishing piers. Common fish species found in the lake include northern pike, largemouth bass, bluegill, and crappie.
