= Young Americans (disambiguation) =

Young Americans is an album by David Bowie.

Young Americans or The Young Americans may also refer to:

- "Young Americans" (song), the title track from the album
- The Young Americans, a show choir
- Young Americans, participants in the Young America movement

== Film and TV ==
- Young Americans (TV series), an American television drama
- Young Americans (1967 film), a documentary about the choir
- Take Me Home Tonight, originally titled Young Americans
- The Young Americans (film), a 1993 crime drama
- The Young Americans, a forthcoming documentary about the Iraq War by Patrick Dollard

== See also ==
- Young America (disambiguation)
- Young Americans Bank, a financial institution designed specifically for people under the age of twenty-two
- Young Americans for Freedom, a conservative youth organization
