= Bongards, Minnesota =

Unincorporated community in Minnesota, US

Bongards
- Unincorporated community
- Location within Minnesota Location within the United States
- Coordinates: 44°45′45″N 93°50′55″W
- Country: United States
- State: Minnesota
- County: Carver
- Township: Benton Township
- Elevation: 984 ft (300 m)
- Time zone: UTC-6 (Central (CST))
  - Summer (DST): UTC-5 (CDT)
- Area code: 952
- GNIS feature ID: 640364

Bongards is an unincorporated community in Benton Township, Carver County, Minnesota, United States.

U.S. Highway 212 and Carver County Road 51 are two of the main routes in the community. Nearby places include Cologne and Norwood Young America.
