= Augusta, Minnesota =

Unincorporated community in Minnesota, US

Augusta
- Unincorporated community
- Location within Minnesota Location within the United States
- Coordinates: 44°48′18″N 93°41′17″W
- Country: United States
- State: Minnesota
- County: Carver
- Township: Laketown Township and Dahlgren Township
- Named after: Augusta Poppitz
- Elevation: 981 ft (299 m)
- Time zone: UTC-6 (Central (CST))
  - Summer (DST): UTC-5 (CDT)
- Area code: 952
- GNIS feature ID: 639513

Augusta is an unincorporated community in Carver County, Minnesota, United States.

The community lies on the boundary line between Laketown Township and Dahlgren Township. The center of Augusta is generally considered near the junction of Carver County Roads 43 and 10 (Engler Boulevard). Nearby places include Chaska and Waconia.

== History ==
A post office was established as Oberles Corners on 1861, the name was changed to Augusta in 1883, and the post office closed in 1911. The community was named for Augusta Poppitz, wife of early settler Ernst Poppitz.
