= Brand Lake =

Lake in the state of Minnesota, United States

- Location within Minnesota
- Location: Carver County, Minnesota
- Coordinates: 44°45′38″N 93°55′56″W
- Type: lake
- Surface elevation: 974 feet (297 m)

Brand Lake is a lake in Carver County, Minnesota, in the United States.

According to historian Warren Upham, a lake called Brandt Lake in Carver County was named for Leroy Brandt, an early settler.
