= OASIS International =

American manufacturing company

- Formerly: Ebco Manufacturing Company, D.A. Ebinger Sanitary Manufacturing Company
- Type: Subsidiary
- Industry: Appliance manufacturing
- Predecessor: Oasis Corporation
- Founded: 1910; 116 years ago
- Headquarters: Columbus, OH
- Area served: Worldwide
- Products: Water coolers; Dehumidifiers; Drinking fountains; Water filters
- Parent: Culligan
- Website: www.oasis.ie; www.oasiscoolers.com

OASIS International is an American company that manufactures drinking water coolers, non-refrigerated water fountains, bottled water dispensers, and dehumidifiers in 80 countries in North America, Asia, and the EMEA regions. Its head office is in Columbus, Ohio and it has production facilities in Mexico and Poland. It also has its European headquarters in Ireland and a permanent office in Shenzhen, China.

The company's history dates to 1910, when it was founded as the "D.A. Ebinger Sanitary Manufacturing Company," and later known as "EBCO." It renamed itself "Oasis" after its popular product lines in 1996.

== History ==
The company was founded as the D.A. Ebinger Sanitary Manufacturing Company in 1910 with its first warehouse located at 400 West Rich Street in Columbus, Ohio manufacturing toilet, sanitary fixtures, and plumbing supplies. After a series of changes in its product categories, it renamed Ebco Manufacturing Company in 1935 before developing into new categories such as water fountains, coolers, dehumidifiers, as well as refrigeration parts.

The company began branding these products under the "OASIS" name in the 1940s. By 1950, it had employed 200 employees and had begun a major expansion of its facilities with a windowless air-conditioned factory in 1953. This was after expanding into the dehumidifier and juice dispenser product categories to a total of 290,000-sqft in 1960 at 265 North Hamilton Road.

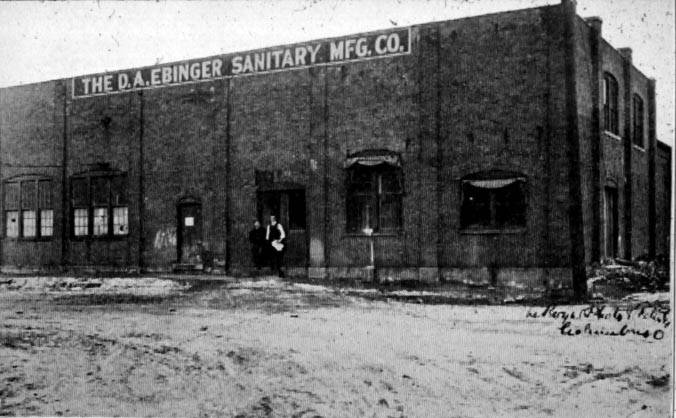
Original factory established in Columbus, Ohio, in 1910

In 1992, a 30,000-sqft manufacturing facility in Ireland was established for the production and distribution of its products in the European and the Middle Eastern market before it was renamed Oasis Corporation later in 1996 due to the popularity of its Oasis line of products.

By the 1990s, it had achieved having the majority of the market share of the bottled water coolers sold in the industry. It expanded to a new manufacturing facility in Poland in 2001 and subsequently acquired Sunroc Corporation in 2003, then the third largest bottled water cooler manufacturer, before having its assets acquired in 2005 by Patriarch Partners due to competition from lower-cost Asian competitors. It was subsequently renamed to OASIS International.

== Products ==
=== Water coolers ===
The company manufactures bottled as well as point-of-use water coolers. It holds several patents in water cooler and dispenser technology including the invention of the disposable bottled cooler water dispenser. Popular products include the Kalix line of water coolers as well as the Aquapointe and Versafiller line of bottle fillers.

It also manufacturers accessories such as water filters and water filtration systems and has partnered with Aquisense on a disinfection solution for water coolers through the use of UV LED filtration.

=== Dehumidifiers ===
Since 1960, the company expanded into a new product category of dehumidifiers for commercial purposes and has been manufacturing them ever since after scaling up to a new factory in 1953.

=== Smart technology ===
In recent years, Oasis has addressed environmental concerns of plastic pollution with a focus on eco-friendly products by introducing bottle filler units at airports with bottle counting functionality. It had also expanded its products with smart water coolers. It began collaborating with Flowdaq, and Ireland-based startup and Activewhere, a Portugal-based industry route management developer, in the hardware development of bottled coolers with IoT functionality running on the Sigfox network.
