= Young America, LLC =

Marketing service company

- Trade name: YA
- Formerly: Dile Corporation (1972-1973)
- Industry: Marketing
- Founded: 1972; 54 years ago in Plymouth, Minnesota
- Headquarters: Minneapolis, Minnesota, United States

YA is a marketing services company with locations in the United States and Canada. The corporation handles rebates, enter to win, loyalty, sampling and channel incentive programs and business process outsourcing for a number of major clients.

== History ==
Originally named Dile Corporation, YA began in 1972 as a three-client promotion fulfillment company in Plymouth, Minnesota. In 1973, the corporation relocated to Young America, Minnesota, and took on the name of the town. In June 2015, the company renamed itself YA.

== Locations ==
YA is headquartered in Minneapolis. Additionally it has a Contact Center in Chatham-Kent, Canada.

In April 2008, YA announced the scheduled closure of the call center in Thunder Bay, ON, transferring all call handling services to the Chatham-Kent center.

In June 2015, YA moved out of their Norwood Young America, MN and Edina, MN offices to the Lumber Exchange building in downtown Minneapolis.

== Criticism ==
On November 7, 2005, officials in Massachusetts filed suit against Young America demanding that they submit an audit for $43 million in uncashed rebate checks. Young America answered, saying that they keep the money in return for charging lower fees to their clients. They stated that it is easier for Young America to keep the money and charge lower fees, rather than sending the money back to the clients and in return having it returned to them as part of the fees. In response to questions from Business Week, the CEO stated "Young America receives the same fees whether a submission is valid or invalid." Massachusetts officials characterized the check retention as a conflict of interest nonetheless.

A similar suit was filed in Iowa in 2006, with officials again demanding an audit for money the corporation is supposedly withholding from the uncashed rebate checks.

Strict guidelines for rebate submissions are intended in part to combat fraudulent submissions. As of 2005, the corporation supposedly had over 10,000 addresses that they monitor for bogus submissions.

As of February 12, 2010, the lawsuit against Young America Corporation was dropped, as the retailers in question were held liable under Iowa state law.
