= Hancock Township, Carver County, Minnesota =

Township in Minnesota, United States

Hancock Township
- Township
- Location within the state of Minnesota Hancock Township (the United States)
- Coordinates: 44°41′40″N 93°49′46″W
- Country: United States
- State: Minnesota
- County: Carver

Area
  - Total: 17.9 sq mi (46.4 km^{2})
  - Land: 17.7 sq mi (45.9 km^{2})
  - Water: 0.15 sq mi (0.4 km^{2})
- Elevation: 935 ft (285 m)

Population (2020)
  - Total: 336
- Time zone: UTC-6 (Central (CST))
  - Summer (DST): UTC-5 (CDT)
- FIPS code: 27-26918
- GNIS feature ID: 0664388

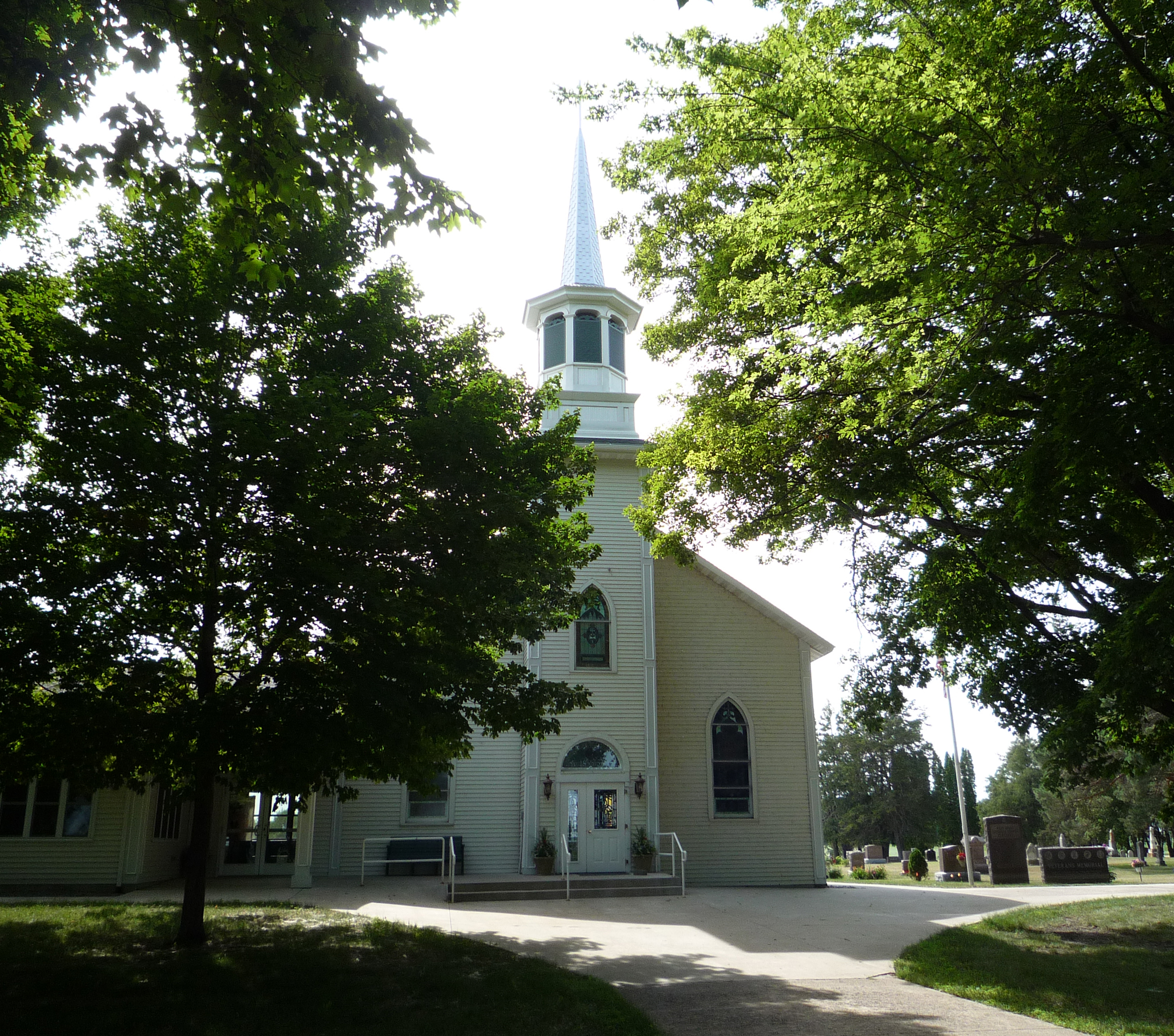
West Union Lutheran Church (1868), in rural Hancock Township, was placed on the National Register of Historic Places because of its important to early Swedish Lutheran settlers in the region.

Hancock Township is a township in Carver County, Minnesota, United States. The population was 336 as of the 2020 census.

== History ==
Hancock Township was organized in 1868, and named for Winfield Scott Hancock, a Union Army general in the Civil War, and afterward candidate for President of the United States.

== Geography ==
According to the United States Census Bureau, the township has a total area of 17.9 square miles (46 km^{2}), of which 17.7 square miles (46 km^{2}) is land and 0.2 square miles (0.52 km^{2}) (0.95%) is water.

Township 114 North, Range 25 West, Fifth Principal Meridian of the Public Land Survey System.

=== Lakes ===
- Assumption Lake

=== Adjacent townships ===
- Benton Township (north)
- Dahlgren Township (northeast)
- San Francisco Township (east)
- Faxon Township, Sibley County (south)
- Washington Lake Township, Sibley County (west)
- Young America Township (northwest)

=== Cemeteries ===
The township contains three cemeteries: Assumption Catholic Cemetery, Bovy Family Cemetery and West Union Lutheran Church Cemetery.

== Demographics ==
Historical population
Census	Pop.	Note	%±
1870	632		—
1880	681		7.8%
1890	550		−19.2%
1900	550		0.0%
1910	486		−11.6%
1920	451		−7.2%
1930	436		−3.3%
1940	462		6.0%
1950	407		−11.9%
1960	393		−3.4%
1970	402		2.3%
1980	391		−2.7%
1990	364		−6.9%
2000	367		0.8%
2010	345		−6.0%
2020	336		−2.6%
U.S. Decennial Census

As of the census of 2000, there were 367 people, 121 households, and 97 families residing in the township. The population density was 20.7 people per square mile (8.0/km^{2}). There were 125 housing units at an average density of 7.1/sq mi (2.7/km^{2}). The racial makeup of the township was 95.91% White, 3.27% Asian, and 0.82% from two or more races. Hispanic or Latino of any race were 0.27% of the population.

There were 121 households, out of which 35.5% had children under the age of 18 living with them, 73.6% were married couples living together, 4.1% had a female householder with no husband present, and 19.8% were non-families. 16.5% of all households were made up of individuals, and 10.7% had someone living alone who was 65 years of age or older. The average household size was 3.03 and the average family size was 3.43.

In the township the population was spread out, with 29.7% under the age of 18, 6.0% from 18 to 24, 30.2% from 25 to 44, 22.1% from 45 to 64, and 12.0% who were 65 years of age or older. The median age was 36 years. For every 100 females, there were 105.0 males. For every 100 females age 18 and over, there were 115.0 males.

The median income for a household in the township was $58,750, and the median income for a family was $70,938. Males had a median income of $36,250 versus $25,000 for females. The per capita income for the township was $20,568. About 6.1% of families and 9.1% of the population were below the poverty line, including 12.1% of those under age 18 and 12.8% of those age 65 or over.

== Politics ==
Presidential election results

2020 Precinct Results Spreadsheet2016 Precinct Results Spreadsheet2012 Precinct Results Spreadsheet2008 Precinct Results Spreadsheet2004 Precinct Results Spreadsheet2000 Precinct Results Spreadsheet1996 Precinct Results1992 Precinct Results1988 Precinct Results1984 Precinct Results1980 Precinct Results1976 Precinct Results1968 Precinct Results1964 Precinct Results1960 Precinct Results
Year	Republican	Democratic	Third parties
2020	80.3% 175	19.3% 42	0.4% 1
2016	71.5% 148	18.8% 39	9.7% 20
2012	65.1% 140	33.5% 72	1.4% 3
2008	68.1% 147	28.2% 61	3.7% 8
2004	71.3% 154	26.9% 58	1.8% 4
2000	68.1% 130	25.7% 49	6.2% 12
1996	47.2% 92	39.5% 77	13.3% 26
1992	47.9% 81	25.4% 43	26.7% 45
1988	67.4% 116	32.6% 56	0.0% 0
1984	68.1% 124	31.9% 58	0.0% 0
1980	65.0% 126	27.8% 54	7.2% 14
1976	48.6% 89	49.2% 90	2.2% 4
1968	70.2% 118	27.4% 46	2.4% 4
1964	60.1% 98	39.3% 64	0.6% 1
1960	78.9% 135	21.1% 36	0.0% 0
