= Carver County, Minnesota =

County in Minnesota, United States

- County
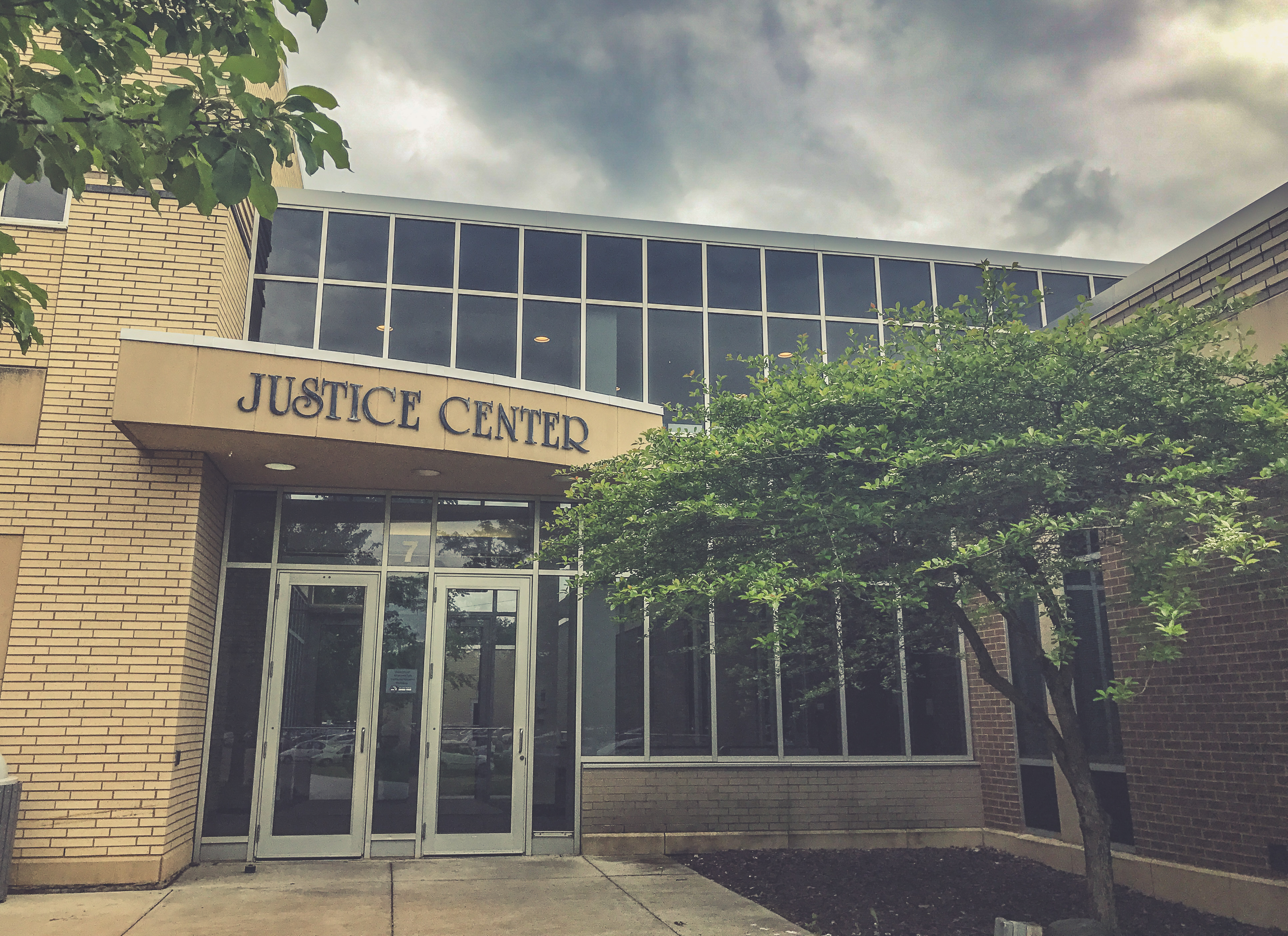
- Carver County Sheriff's Office and Justice Center in Chaska, Minnesota

- Location within the U.S. state of Minnesota
- Coordinates: 44°49′N 93°48′W
- Country: United States
- State: Minnesota
- Founded: February 20, 1855
- Named for: Jonathan Carver
- Seat: Chaska
- Largest city: Chaska

Area
  - Total: 376 sq mi (970 km^{2})
  - Land: 354 sq mi (920 km^{2})
  - Water: 22 sq mi (57 km^{2}) 5.8%

Population (2020)
  - Total: 106,922
  - Estimate (2025): 114,379 ▲
  - Density: 302/sq mi (117/km^{2})
- Time zone: UTC−6 (Central)
  - Summer (DST): UTC−5 (CDT)
- Congressional district: 6th
- Website: https://www.carvercountymn.gov/

Carver County is a county in the U.S. state of Minnesota. As of the 2020 census, the population was 106,922. Its county seat is Chaska. Carver County is named for explorer Jonathan Carver, who in 1766–67, traveled from Boston to the Minnesota River and wintered among the Sioux near the site of New Ulm. Carver County is part of the Minneapolis-St. Paul-Bloomington, MN-WI Metropolitan Statistical Area.

== Statistics ==
In 2017, Carver County was ranked by the Robert Wood Johnson Foundation as the healthiest county in the State of Minnesota for the fifth year in a row. The foundation explained health outcomes represent “how healthy counties are within the state,” whereas health factors represent “an estimate of the future health of counties as compared with other counties within a state,” based on health behaviors, clinical care, and other environmental factors. Carver County continued to rank as the number one healthiest county throughout the state for 2018, 2019, and 2020.

In 2018, Carver County was ranked as the #1 "Happiest Place in America" according to a study conducted by the data firm Smart Asset. Carver County was one of three United States counties to receive a top 5 ranking for the third straight year. The other two counties were Loudoun and Fairfax counties in Virginia. The study compared counties across the country using the following eight factors: unemployment rate, poverty rate, affordability ratio, marriage rate, divorce rate, bankruptcy rate, life expectancy, and physical activity rate. In particular, Carver County scored well thanks to strong economic conditions with an unemployment rate of only 3.1% and a poverty rate of only 4.1%. Additionally, according to the data, 62% of residents were married and only 8% divorced. In each of those metrics, Carver ranked in the top 40 in the country.

== Geography ==
The Minnesota River flows east-northeasterly along the county's southern border. The South Fork of the Crow River flows northeasterly through the upper western and central portions of the county. Carver Creek flows southeasterly from the county's central area, discharging into the Minnesota at the county's southern border. The terrain consists of low rolling hills, dotted with lakes in the eastern portion. The area is devoted to agriculture.

Soils of Carver County

The terrain slopes to the east and south, with its northwest corner at 1,024 ft (312 m) ASL. A small hill 1.6 miles (2.6 km) northeast of Miller Lake rises to 1,080 ft (330 m) ASL, for the county's highest point.

The county has a total area of 376 square miles (970 km^{2}), of which 354 square miles (920 km^{2}) is land and 22 square miles (57 km^{2}) (5.8%) is water. It is Minnesota's second-smallest county by land area and third-smallest by total area.

Carver is one of seven southern Minnesota counties with no forest soils; only prairie ecosystems of savannas and prairies can be found in Carver County. It is also one of 17 Minnesota counties where savanna soils dominate.

=== Lakes ===
Carver County is home to seven lakes of 235 acres or larger. The largest is Lake Waconia, Minnesota's 73rd largest lake and the Twin Cities' second largest lake, with an area of 2,996 acres.

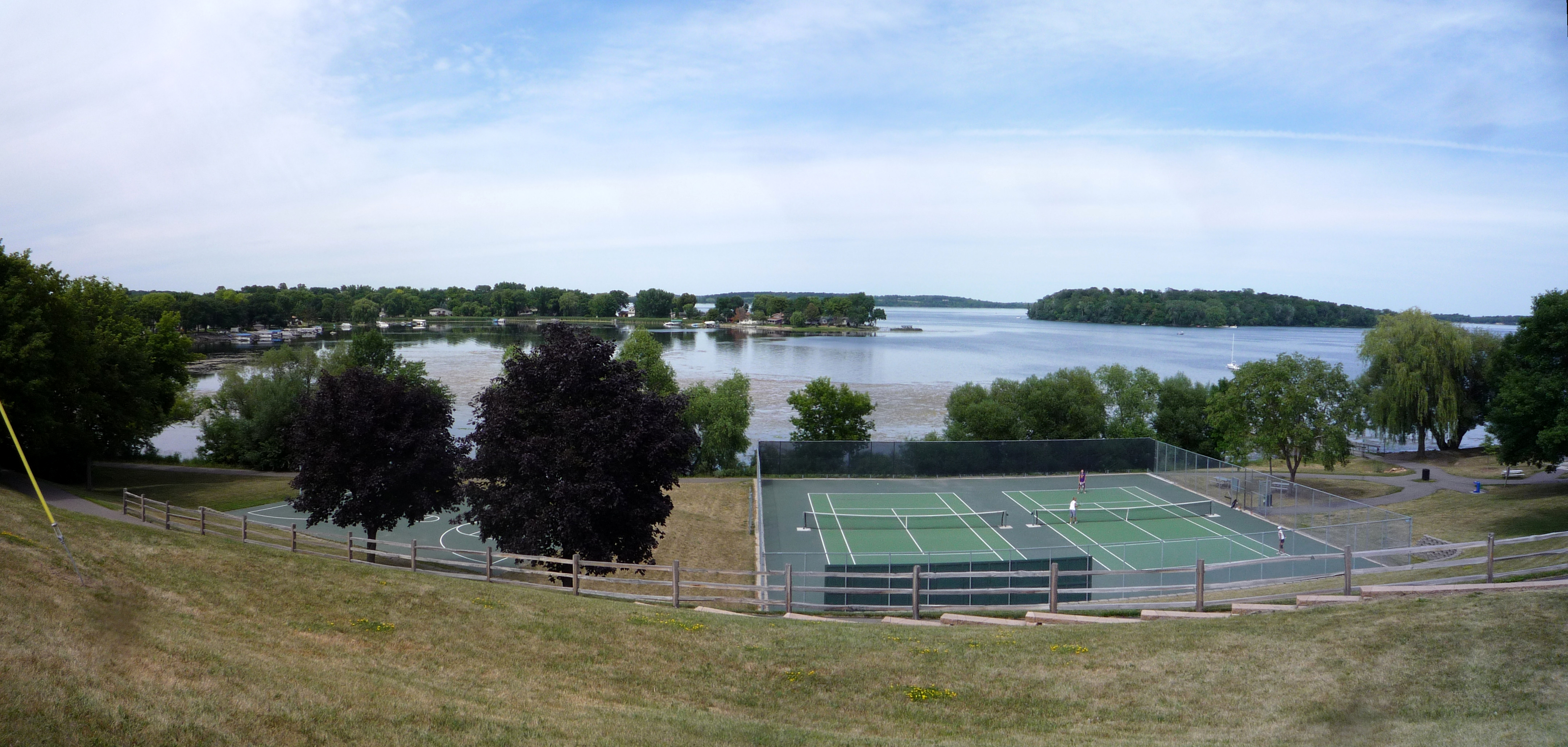
Lake Waconia

Township	Lakes
Benton Township	Barlous Lake, Benton Lake, Maria Lake, Meuwissen Lake, Myers Lake, Rice Lake, Winkler Lake
Camden Township	Berliner Lake, Eagle Lake, Smith Lake
Dahlgren Township	Aue Lake
Hancock Township	Assumption Lake, Gaystock Lake, Maria Lake, Miller Lake,
Hollywood Township	Lippert Lake
Laketown Township	Carl Krey Lake, Lake Auburn, Lake Virginia, Lake Waconia, Lake Zumbra, Lunsten Lake, Marsh Lake, Parley Lake, Piersons Lake, Reitz Lake, Schutz Lake, Stieger Lake, Sunny Lake, Turbid Lake, Wasserman Lake, Lake Bavaria
San Francisco Township	Hallquist Lake, Kelly Lake, Long Lake, Scott Lake,
Waconia Township	Burandt Lake, Donders Lake, Goose Lake, Hydes Lake, Lake Minnewashta, Lake Patterson, Lake Waconia, Rutz Lake, Swan Lake
Watertown Township	Buck Lake, Goose Lake, Lippert Lake, Mud Lake, Oak Lake, Swede Lake
Young America Township	Barnes Lake, Brand Lake, Braunworth Lake, Tiger Lake, Young America Lake

=== Major highways ===
- U.S. Highway 212
- Minnesota State Highway 5
- Minnesota State Highway 7
- Minnesota State Highway 25
- Minnesota State Highway 41
- Minnesota State Highway 284
- Carver County Road 10
- Carver County Road 11
- Carver County Road 33
- Other county roads

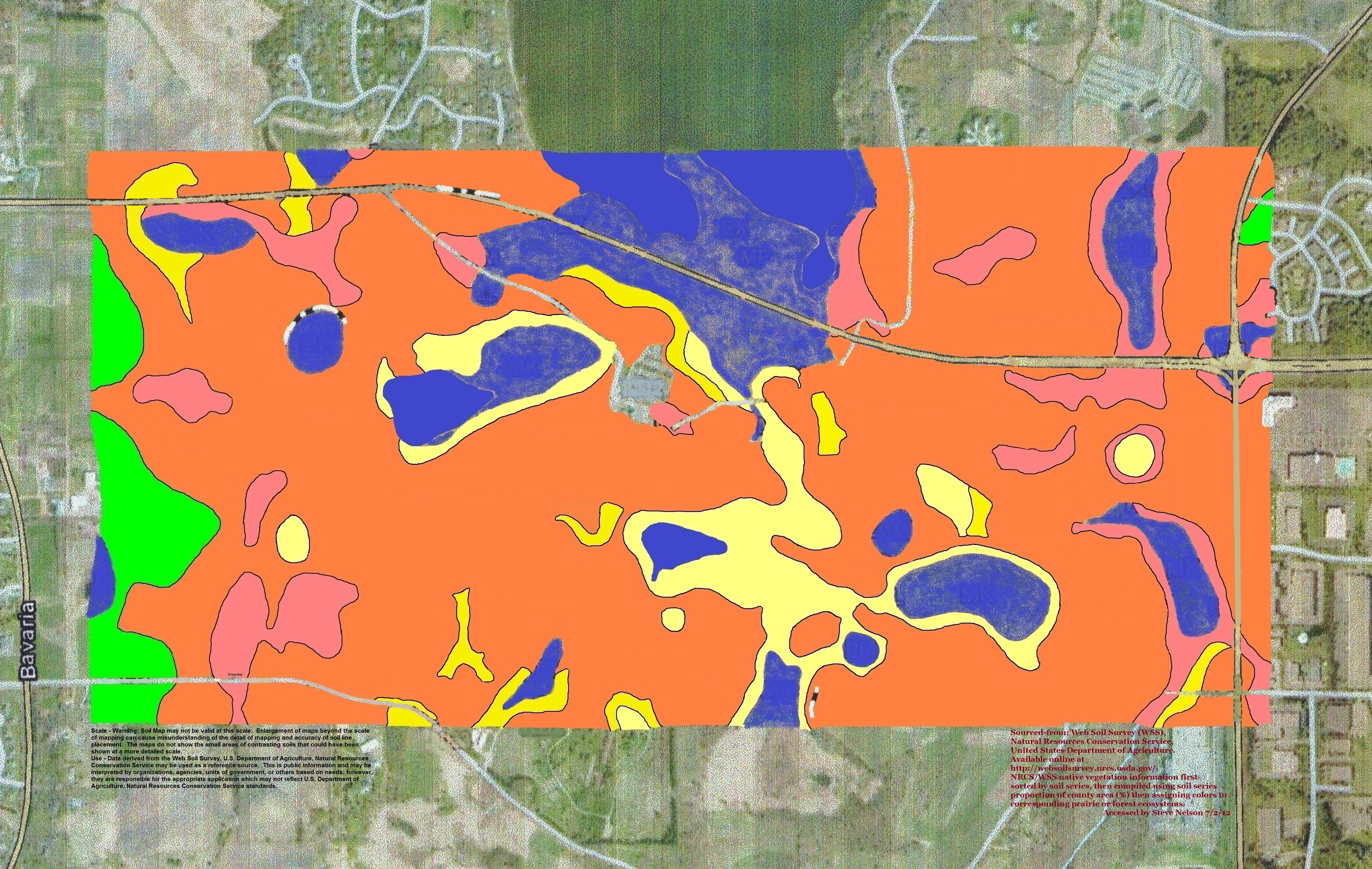
Soils of the Minnesota Landscape Arboretum area

=== Adjacent counties ===
- Wright County – north
- Hennepin County – northeast
- Scott County – southeast
- Sibley County – southwest
- McLeod County – west

=== Protected areas ===
- Assumption State Wildlife Management Area
- Carver Park Preserve
- Gravel Pit State Wildlife Management Area
- Lake Minnewashta Regional Park
- Minnesota Landscape Arboretum
- Minnesota Valley National Wildlife Refuge (part)
- Minnesota Valley State Recreation Area (part)
- Waconia State Wildlife Management Area

== Climate and weather ==
In recent years, average temperatures in the county seat of Chaska have ranged from a low of 4 °F (−16 °C) in January to a high of 81 °F (27 °C) in July, although a record low of −41 °F (−41 °C) was recorded in January 1970 and a record high of 105 °F (41 °C) was recorded in July 1988. Average monthly precipitation ranged from 0.66 inches (17 mm) in February to 5.05 inches (128 mm) in August.

Climate chart for Carver County, Minnesota

Chaska, Minnesota

Climate chart (precipitation, max. and min. temperature)
J	F	M	A	M	J	J	A	S	O	N	D
- █ Average max. and min. temperatures in °F
- █ Precipitation totals in inches
- Source: The Weather Channel
Metric conversion
J	F	M	A	M	J	J	A	S	O	N	D
- █ Average max. and min. temperatures in °C
- █ Precipitation totals in mm

== Demographics ==
Historical population
Census	Pop.	Note	%±
1860	5,106		—
1870	11,586		126.9%
1880	14,140		22.0%
1890	16,532		16.9%
1900	17,544		6.1%
1910	17,455		−0.5%
1920	16,946		−2.9%
1930	16,936		−0.1%
1940	17,606		4.0%
1950	18,155		3.1%
1960	21,358		17.6%
1970	28,331		32.6%
1980	37,046		30.8%
1990	47,915		29.3%
2000	70,205		46.5%
2010	91,042		29.7%
2020	106,922		17.4%
2025 (est.)	114,379	▲	7.0%
U.S. Decennial Census; 1790–1960 1900–1990; 1990–2000 2010–2020

=== 2020 census ===
As of the 2020 United States census, the county had a population of 106,922. The median age was 38.6 years. 27.2% of residents were under the age of 18 and 12.8% of residents were 65 years of age or older. For every 100 females there were 97.6 males, and for every 100 females age 18 and over there were 95.3 males age 18 and over.

The racial makeup of the county was 86.5% White, 2.1% Black or African American, 0.3% American Indian and Alaska Native, 3.4% Asian, <0.1% Native Hawaiian and Pacific Islander, 2.3% from some other race, and 5.5% from two or more races. Hispanic or Latino residents of any race comprised 5.0% of the population.

75.3% of residents lived in urban areas, while 24.7% lived in rural areas.

There were 38,863 households in the county, of which 38.3% had children under the age of 18 living in them. Of all households, 62.6% were married-couple households, 12.7% were households with a male householder and no spouse or partner present, and 19.4% were households with a female householder and no spouse or partner present. About 20.8% of all households were made up of individuals and 8.6% had someone living alone who was 65 years of age or older.

There were 40,380 housing units, of which 3.8% were vacant. Among occupied housing units, 81.1% were owner-occupied and 18.9% were renter-occupied. The homeowner vacancy rate was 1.0% and the rental vacancy rate was 5.4%.

=== Racial and ethnic composition ===
Carver County, Minnesota – Racial and ethnic composition Note: the US Census treats Hispanic/Latino as an ethnic category. This table excludes Latinos from the racial categories and assigns them to a separate category. Hispanics/Latinos may be of any race.
Race / Ethnicity (NH = Non-Hispanic)	Pop 1980	Pop 1990	Pop 2000	Pop 2010	Pop 2020	% 1980	% 1990	% 2000	% 2010	% 2020
White alone (NH)	36,688	47,008	66,268	82,536	91,443	99.03%	98.11%	94.39%	90.66%	85.52%
Black or African American alone (NH)	44	103	399	1,068	2,173	0.12%	0.21%	0.57%	1.17%	2.03%
Native American or Alaska Native alone (NH)	66	101	119	186	193	0.18%	0.21%	0.17%	0.20%	0.18%
Asian alone (NH)	106	438	1,085	2,456	3,617	0.29%	0.91%	1.55%	2.70%	3.38%
Native Hawaiian or Pacific Islander alone (NH)	x	x	9	9	15	x	x	0.01%	0.01%	0.01%
Other race alone (NH)	17	13	46	69	284	0.05%	0.03%	0.07%	0.08%	0.27%
Mixed race or Multiracial (NH)	x	x	488	1,203	3,889	x	x	0.70%	1.32%	3.64%
Hispanic or Latino (any race)	125	252	1,791	3,515	5,308	0.34%	0.53%	2.55%	3.86%	4.96%
Total	37,046	47,915	70,205	91,042	106,922	100.00%	100.00%	100.00%	100.00%	100.00%

=== 2010 census ===
The ethnic makeup of the county, according to the 2010 census, was the following:

- 93.7% White
- 1.5% Black
- 0.3% American Indian
- 2.9% Asian
- 0.0% Native Hawaiian or Pacific Islander
- 1.6% Two or more races
- 0.3% Other races
- 4.1% Hispanic or Latino (of any race)

There were 33,486 households, out of which 42.1% had children under the age of 18 living with them, 62.9% were married couples living together, 7.6% had a female householder with no husband present, and 25.9% were non-families. 21.0% of all households were made up of individuals, and 6.9% had someone living alone who was 65 years of age or older. The average household size was 2.74 and the average family size was 3.22.

The median income for a household in the county was $83,773, and the median income for a family was $96,913. Males had a median income of $66,150 versus $46,696 for females. The per capita income for the county was $37,457. About 3.3% of families and 4.9% of the population were below the poverty line, including 5.5% of those under age 18 and 7.8% of those age 65 or over.

=== 2000 census ===
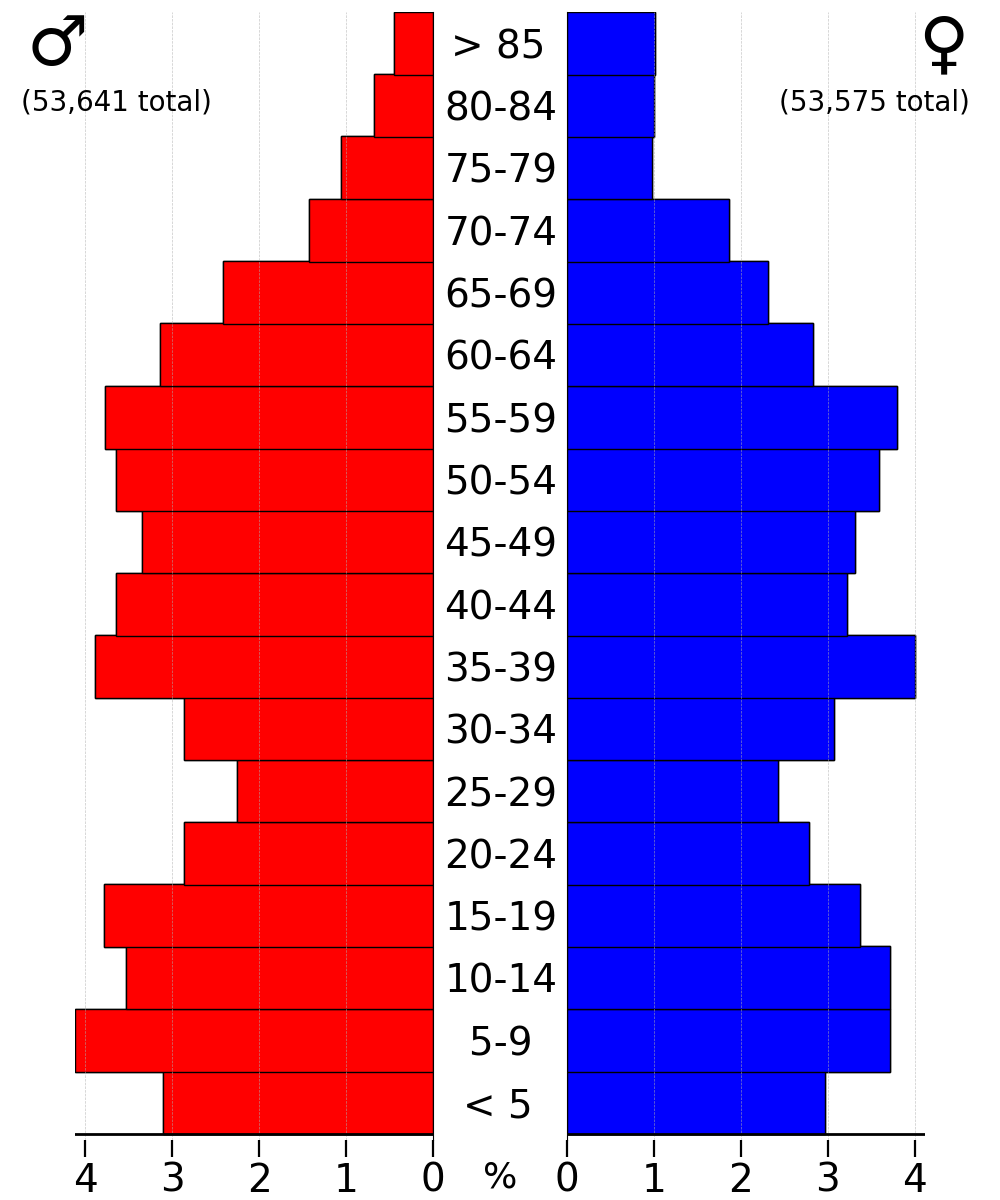
2022 US Census population pyramid for Carver County, from ACS 5-year estimates

As of the census of 2000, there were 70,205 people, 24,356 households, and 18,778 families in the county. The population density was 198 per square mile (76/km^{2}). There were 24,883 housing units at an average density of 70.3 per square mile (27.1/km^{2}). The racial makeup of the county was 95.95% White, 0.59% Black or African American, 0.18% Native American, 1.56% Asian, 0.01% Pacific Islander, 0.87% from other races, and 0.82% from two or more races. 2.55% of the population were Hispanic or Latino of any race. 44.3% were of German, 12.1% Norwegian, 7.1% Irish and 6.2% Swedish ancestry.

There were 24,356 households, out of which 45.20% had children under the age of 18 living with them, 66.40% were married couples living together, 7.30% had a female householder with no husband present, and 22.90% were non-families. 18.10% of all households were made up of individuals, and 6.10% had someone living alone who was 65 years of age or older. The average household size was 2.84 and the average family size was 3.26.

The county population contained 31.50% under the age of 18, 6.90% from 18 to 24, 34.70% from 25 to 44, 19.50% from 45 to 64, and 7.50% who were 65 years of age or older. The median age was 34 years. For every 100 females there were 100.00 males. For every 100 females age 18 and over, there were 98.00 males.

The median income for a household in the county was $65,540, and the median income for a family was $73,577 (these figures had risen to $78,035 and $89,100 respectively as of a 2007 estimate). Males had a median income of $47,271 versus $32,107 for females. The per capita income for the county was $28,486. About 2.30% of families and 3.50% of the population were below the poverty line, including 3.60% of those under age 18 and 6.90% of those age 65 or over.

== Economy ==
According to the county's comprehensive annual financial reports, the top employers by number of employees in the county are the following. ("NR" indicates the employer was not ranked among the top ten employers that year.)

Employer	Employees (2022)	Employees (2012)
Independent School District 112 (Eastern Carver County)	2,056	1,129
Ridgeview Medical Center	1,500	1,500
Emerson Process Management	1,201	1,800
Strom Aviation	1,001	NR
IWCO Direct	1,000	1,000
Independent School District 110 (Waconia)	900	NR
Carver County	785	793
Beckman Coulter	780	780
Bernard Group	600	NR
General Mills	600	NR
SuperValu	NR	700
Target	NR	700
Elkay Manufacturing	NR	620
Lake Region Manufacturing	NR	600

== Government and politics ==
=== Government ===
Like all counties in Minnesota, Carver County is governed by an elected, nonpartisan board of commissioners. Each commissioner represents a district of approximately equal population.

==== County commissioners ====
The county commission elects a chair, who presides at meetings. The commissioners as of September 2024 are:

District	Commissioner	In office since	Next election	Area served
1st	Gayle Degler (Chair)	2002	2024	Chaska, Chanhassen
2nd	Tom Workman	2002	2026	Chanhassen, Victoria
3rd	Matt Udermann	2020	2024	Chaska, Victoria
4th	Tim Lynch	2004	2026	Hollywood Twp, Watertown Twp, Waconia Twp, Mayer, Waconia, Watertown
5th	John P. Fahey (Vice Chair)	2020	2026	Benton Twp, Camden Twp, Dahlgren Twp, Hancock Twp, Laketown Twp, San Francisco Twp, Young America Twp, Carver, Cologne, Hamburg, New Germany, Norwood Young America

==== Politics ====
Carver County is located in Minnesota's 6th congressional district (CPVI R+12), represented by Republican Tom Emmer.

United States presidential election results for Carver County, Minnesota
Year	Republican		Democratic		Third party(ies)	
Year	No.	%	No.	%	No.	%
1892	1,191	40.35%	1,462	49.53%	299	10.13%
1896	1,856	58.25%	1,268	39.80%	62	1.95%
1900	1,775	59.54%	1,146	38.44%	60	2.01%
1904	1,735	70.44%	672	27.28%	56	2.27%
1908	1,739	60.03%	1,101	38.00%	57	1.97%
1912	742	26.86%	1,008	36.50%	1,012	36.64%
1916	1,950	65.57%	960	32.28%	64	2.15%
1920	5,073	87.31%	562	9.67%	175	3.01%
1924	2,214	40.20%	358	6.50%	2,936	53.30%
1928	3,983	57.72%	2,885	41.81%	33	0.48%
1932	2,508	36.34%	4,328	62.71%	66	0.96%
1936	3,095	42.44%	2,814	38.59%	1,383	18.97%
1940	6,528	78.62%	1,753	21.11%	22	0.26%
1944	5,823	78.40%	1,565	21.07%	39	0.53%
1948	4,582	61.24%	2,816	37.64%	84	1.12%
1952	6,674	75.43%	2,159	24.40%	15	0.17%
1956	6,226	72.49%	2,334	27.17%	29	0.34%
1960	6,231	60.93%	3,982	38.94%	14	0.14%
1964	5,424	51.37%	5,123	48.52%	11	0.10%
1968	6,649	56.44%	4,590	38.96%	541	4.59%
1972	8,546	61.46%	4,852	34.89%	507	3.65%
1976	8,199	50.16%	7,574	46.33%	574	3.51%
1980	9,909	53.62%	6,621	35.83%	1,951	10.56%
1984	11,963	63.60%	6,725	35.75%	121	0.64%
1988	12,560	59.17%	8,439	39.75%	229	1.08%
1992	10,201	38.34%	8,349	31.38%	8,054	30.27%
1996	12,380	43.95%	11,554	41.02%	4,234	15.03%
2000	20,790	59.36%	12,462	35.58%	1,769	5.05%
2004	28,510	62.78%	16,456	36.24%	445	0.98%
2008	28,156	56.67%	20,654	41.57%	873	1.76%
2012	31,155	58.90%	20,745	39.22%	999	1.89%
2016	29,056	52.17%	21,508	38.62%	5,132	9.21%
2020	34,009	51.25%	30,774	46.37%	1,578	2.38%
2024	35,586	51.45%	31,869	46.08%	1,705	2.47%

State Legislature (2023–2025)
Position	Name	Affiliation	District
Senate	Glenn Gruenhagen	Republican	District 17
Senate	Julia Coleman	Republican	District 48
House of Representatives	Bobbie Harder	Republican	District 17B
House of Representatives	Jim Nash	Republican	District 48A
House of Representatives	Lucy Rehm	DFL	District 48B

U.S. Congress (2023–2025)
Position	Name	Affiliation	District
House of Representatives	Tom Emmer	Republican	6th
Senate	Amy Klobuchar	Democratic	N/A
Senate	Tina Smith	Democratic	N/A

== Communities ==
=== Cities ===
- Carver
- Chanhassen (Partly in Hennepin County)
- Chaska (county seat)
- Cologne
- Hamburg
- Mayer
- New Germany
- Norwood Young America
- Victoria
- Waconia
- Watertown

=== Census-designated place ===
- Crown College

Crown College is in a census-designated place, in Laketown Township in the county. It has a St. Bonifacius post office address, but is not in the same county as the city, and is not in the city limits.

=== Unincorporated communities ===
- Assumption
- Augusta
- Bongards
- Coney Island
- Dahlgren
- East Union
- Gotha
- Hazelton
- Hollywood
- Maple
- Oster
- San Francisco (ghost town)

=== Townships ===
- Benton Township
- Camden Township
- Dahlgren Township
- Hancock Township
- Hollywood Township
- Laketown Township
- San Francisco Township
- Waconia Township
- Watertown Township
- Young America Township

== Education ==
School districts include:

- Belle Plaine Public School District
- Central Public School District
- Eastern Carver County Public Schools
- Glencoe-Silver Lake School District
- Howard Lake-Waverly-Winsted School District
- Lester Prairie Public School District
- Minnetonka Public School District
- Waconia Public Schools
- Watertown-Mayer Public School District

== See also ==
- National Register of Historic Places listings in Carver County, Minnesota
