= Norwood Young America, Minnesota =

City in Minnesota, United States

Norwood Young America
- City
- Location of the city of Norwood Young America within Carver County, Minnesota
- Coordinates: 44°46′19″N 93°55′06″W
- Country: United States
- State: Minnesota
- County: Carver
- Merged: 1997

Area
  - Total: 2.49 sq mi (6.46 km^{2})
  - Land: 2.49 sq mi (6.45 km^{2})
  - Water: 0 sq mi (0.00 km^{2})
- Elevation: 984 ft (300 m)

Population (2020)
  - Total: 3,863
  - Density: 1,550.0/sq mi (598.47/km^{2})
- Time zone: UTC-6 (CST)
  - Summer (DST): UTC-5 (CDT)
- ZIP codes: 55368, 55397, 55473 plus about 20 more.
- Area code: 952
- FIPS code: 27-47520
- GNIS feature ID: 2395278
- Website: cityofnya.com

Norwood Young America is a city in Carver County, Minnesota, United States, located about 40 miles west of Minneapolis. The city was formed in 1997 from the merging of two formerly independent cities, Norwood and Young America, which had been founded in the 19th century. The population was 3,863 at the 2020 census.

== History ==
Young America was platted in 1856 and incorporated on March 4, 1876. Originally named Farmington, this was quickly changed to Florence, and then finally Young America in 1863. The town was named for "the vigor and progressiveness of the young people of the United States". Norwood was platted in 1872 and incorporated in 1881. The origins of the town's name are unclear, supposedly it is "named by Mr. Slocum, an early banker there, for an eastern relative or friend of his wife."

Norwood Young America was formed on January 1, 1997 when Norwood and Young America merged. The city has been called by the abbreviation NYA, but is often simply called either Norwood or Young America.

== Geography ==
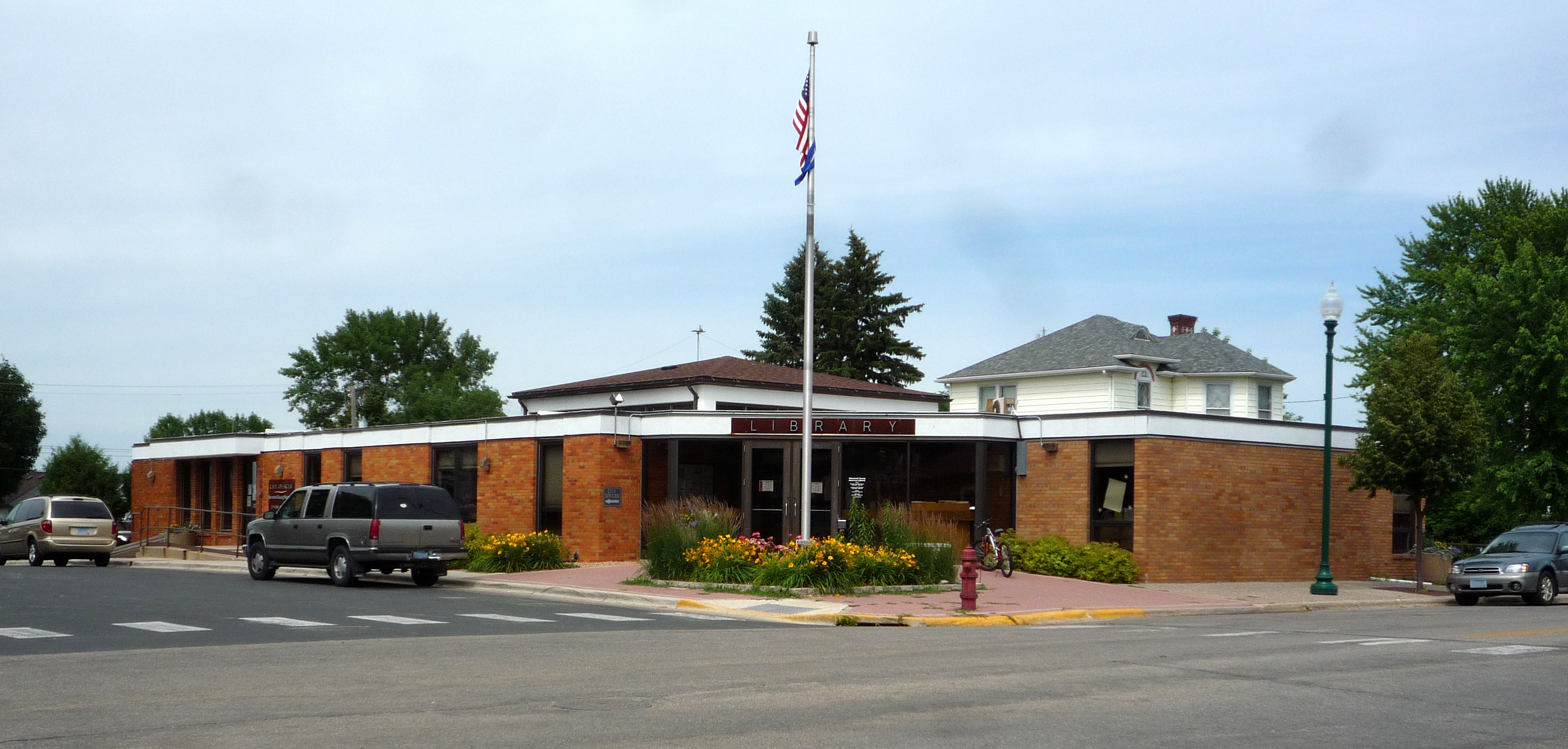
City Hall and Library

According to the United States Census Bureau, the city has a total area of 2.52 square miles (6.53 km^{2}), all land.

US 212, MN 5, and MN 25 are three of the main routes in the community.

== Demographics ==
Historical population
Census	Pop.	Note	%±
2000	3,108		—
2010	3,549		14.2%
2020	3,863		8.8%
U.S. Decennial Census

Historical population
Census	Pop.	Note	%±
1880	338		—
1890	385		13.9%
1900	500		29.9%
1910	522		4.4%
1920	563		7.9%
1930	607		7.8%
1940	648		6.8%
1950	749		15.6%
1960	945		26.2%
1970	1,058		12.0%
1980	1,219		15.2%
1990	1,351		10.8%
2020	3,863		—
U.S. Census for Norwood

Historical population
Census	Pop.	Note	%±
1880	151		—
1890	287		90.1%
1900	318		10.8%
1910	303		−4.7%
1920	335		10.6%
1930	296		−11.6%
1940	406		37.2%
1950	365		−10.1%
1960	477		30.7%
1970	611		28.1%
1980	1,237		102.5%
1990	1,354		9.5%
2020	3,863		—
U.S. Census for Young America

=== 2020 census ===
As of the 2020 census, Norwood Young America had a population of 3,863. The median age was 39.2 years. 25.0% of residents were under the age of 18 and 17.9% of residents were 65 years of age or older. For every 100 females there were 94.5 males, and for every 100 females age 18 and over there were 90.7 males age 18 and over.

0.0% of residents lived in urban areas, while 100.0% lived in rural areas.

There were 1,551 households in Norwood Young America, of which 30.3% had children under the age of 18 living in them. Of all households, 50.6% were married-couple households, 16.4% were households with a male householder and no spouse or partner present, and 26.2% were households with a female householder and no spouse or partner present. About 30.2% of all households were made up of individuals and 14.9% had someone living alone who was 65 years of age or older.

There were 1,632 housing units, of which 5.0% were vacant. The homeowner vacancy rate was 1.2% and the rental vacancy rate was 6.9%.

Racial composition as of the 2020 census
Race	Number	Percent
White	3,512	90.9%
Black or African American	64	1.7%
American Indian and Alaska Native	17	0.4%
Asian	22	0.6%
Native Hawaiian and Other Pacific Islander	1	0.0%
Some other race	77	2.0%
Two or more races	170	4.4%
Hispanic or Latino (of any race)	185	4.8%

=== 2010 census ===
As of the 2010 census, there were 3,549 people, 1,389 households, and 954 families living in the city. The population density was 1,408.3 inhabitants per square mile (543.7/km^{2}). There were 1,472 housing units at an average density of 584.1 per square mile (225.5/km^{2}). The racial makeup of the city was 95.2% White, 0.4% African American, 0.2% Native American, 0.5% Asian, 2.4% from other races, and 1.2% from two or more races. Hispanic or Latino of any race were 4.1% of the population.

There were 1,389 households, of which 35.9% had children under the age of 18 living with them, 53.1% were married couples living together, 10.5% had a female householder with no husband present, 5.0% had a male householder with no wife present, and 31.3% were non-families. 25.6% of all households were made up of individuals, and 11.7% had someone living alone who was 65 years of age or older. The average household size was 2.55 and the average family size was 3.05.

The median age in the city was 35.8 years. 27.2% of residents were under the age of 18; 7.3% were between the ages of 18 and 24; 28.3% were from 25 to 44; 25.8% were from 45 to 64; and 11.5% were 65 years of age or older. The gender makeup of the city was 49.5% male and 50.5% female.

=== 2000 census ===
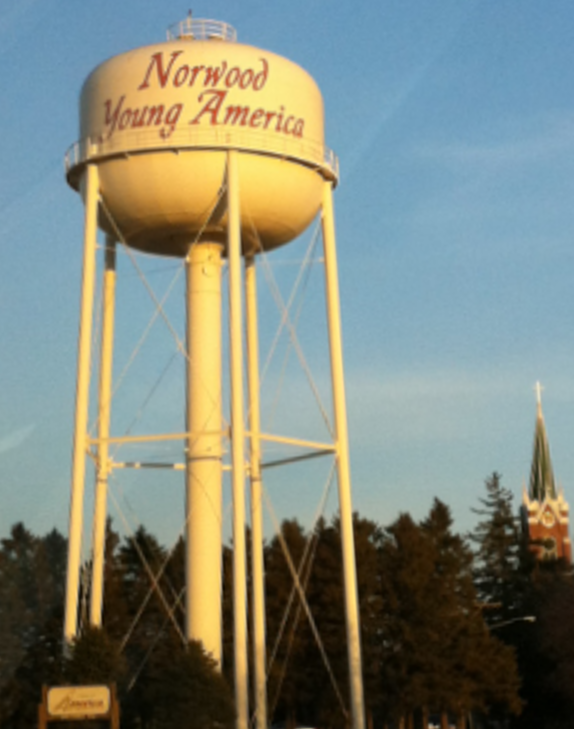
Watertower in Norwood Young America

As of the census of 2000, there were 3,108 people, 1,171 households, and 833 families living in the city. The population density was 1,855.8 inhabitants per square mile (716.5/km^{2}). There were 1,201 housing units at an average density of 717.1 per square mile (276.9/km^{2}). The racial makeup of the city was 98.10% White, 0.13% African American, 0.45% Native American, 0.42% Asian, 0.51% from other races, and 0.39% from two or more races. Hispanic or Latino of any race were 2.64% of the population.

There were 1,171 households, out of which 40.5% had children under the age of 18 living with them, 58.2% were married couples living together, 8.5% had a female householder with no husband present, and 28.8% were non-families. 24.2% of all households were made up of individuals, and 11.7% had someone living alone who was 65 years of age or older. The average household size was 2.65 and the average family size was 3.19.

In the city, the population was spread out, with 29.4% under the age of 18, 9.9% from 18 to 24, 31.0% from 25 to 44, 18.0% from 45 to 64, and 11.7% who were 65 years of age or older. The median age was 33 years. For every 100 females, there were 93.9 males. For every 100 females age 18 and over, there were 92.9 males.

The median income for a household in the city was $46,152, and the median income for a family was $54,792. Males had a median income of $36,292 versus $26,837 for females. The per capita income for the city was $18,431. About 2.7% of families and 5.6% of the population were below the poverty line, including 4.7% of those under age 18 and 8.2% of those age 65 or over.

== Politics ==
Presidential election results

Precinct General Election Results
Year	Republican	Democratic	Third parties
2024	65.6% 1,471	32.6% 731	1.9% 42
2020	67.4% 1,489	30.3% 670	2.3% 51
2016	65.2% 1,243	27.0% 515	7.8% 150
2012	61.8% 1,118	35.6% 644	2.6% 46
2008	60.1% 1,077	37.0% 663	2.9% 51
2004	67.1% 1,098	32.1% 525	0.8% 14
2000	59.5% 767	32.7% 422	7.8% 100

== Business ==
In 1973, the Dile Corporation moved to Young America, and changed its name to Young America Corporation. It is one of the town's largest employers, processing rebate, coupon, and other marketing programs for businesses. It receives a great deal of mail, enough that this small town has over 20 ZIP codes. A main one is 55555.

The town has a main junction of the Twin Cities and Western Railroad, which connects with its wholly owned subsidiary, the Minnesota Prairie Line, just east of downtown.

=== National Register of Historic Places gallery ===
Norwood Young America has several buildings listed on the National Register of Historic Places.

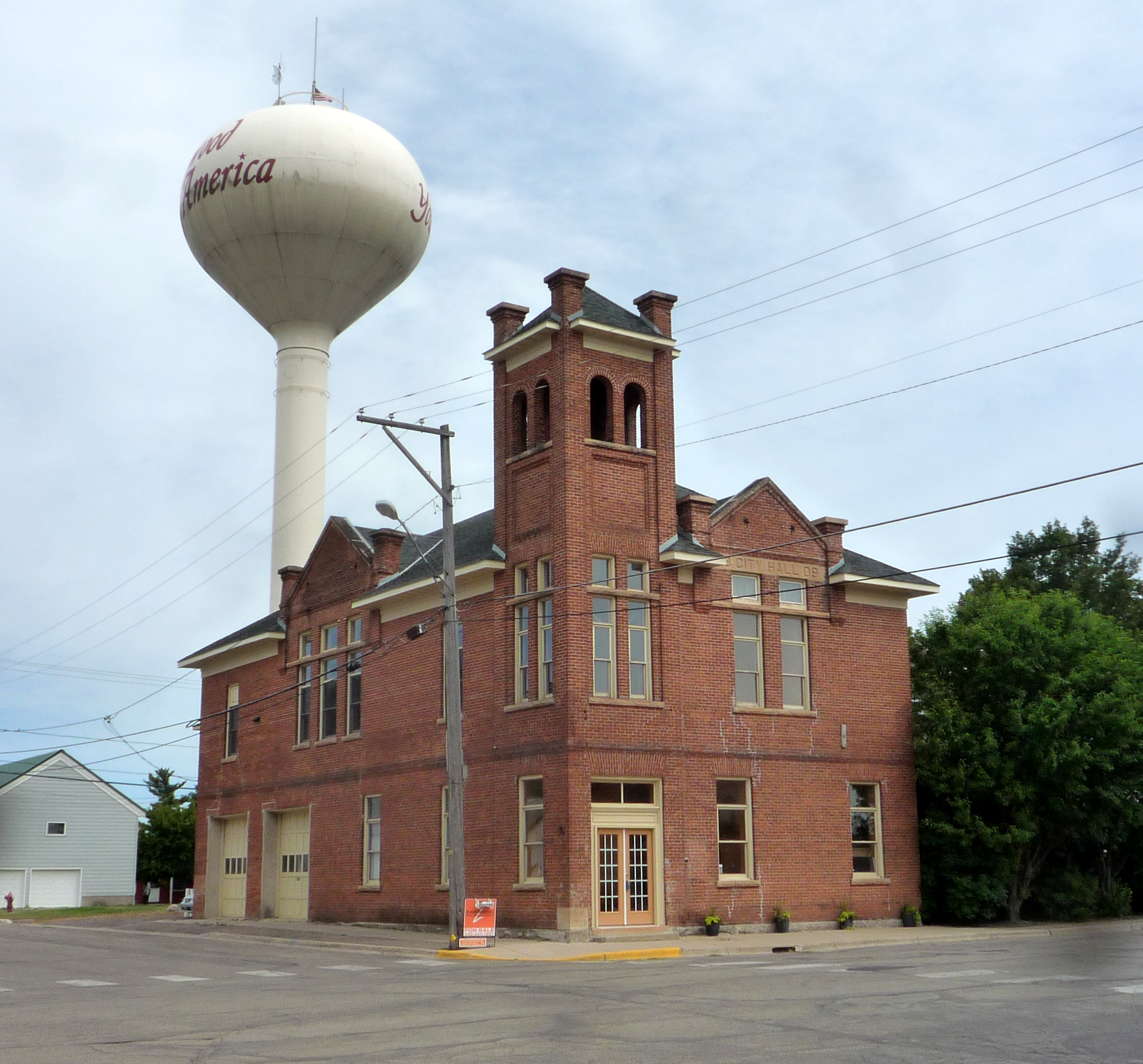
Young America City Hall, now converted to a live/work space.

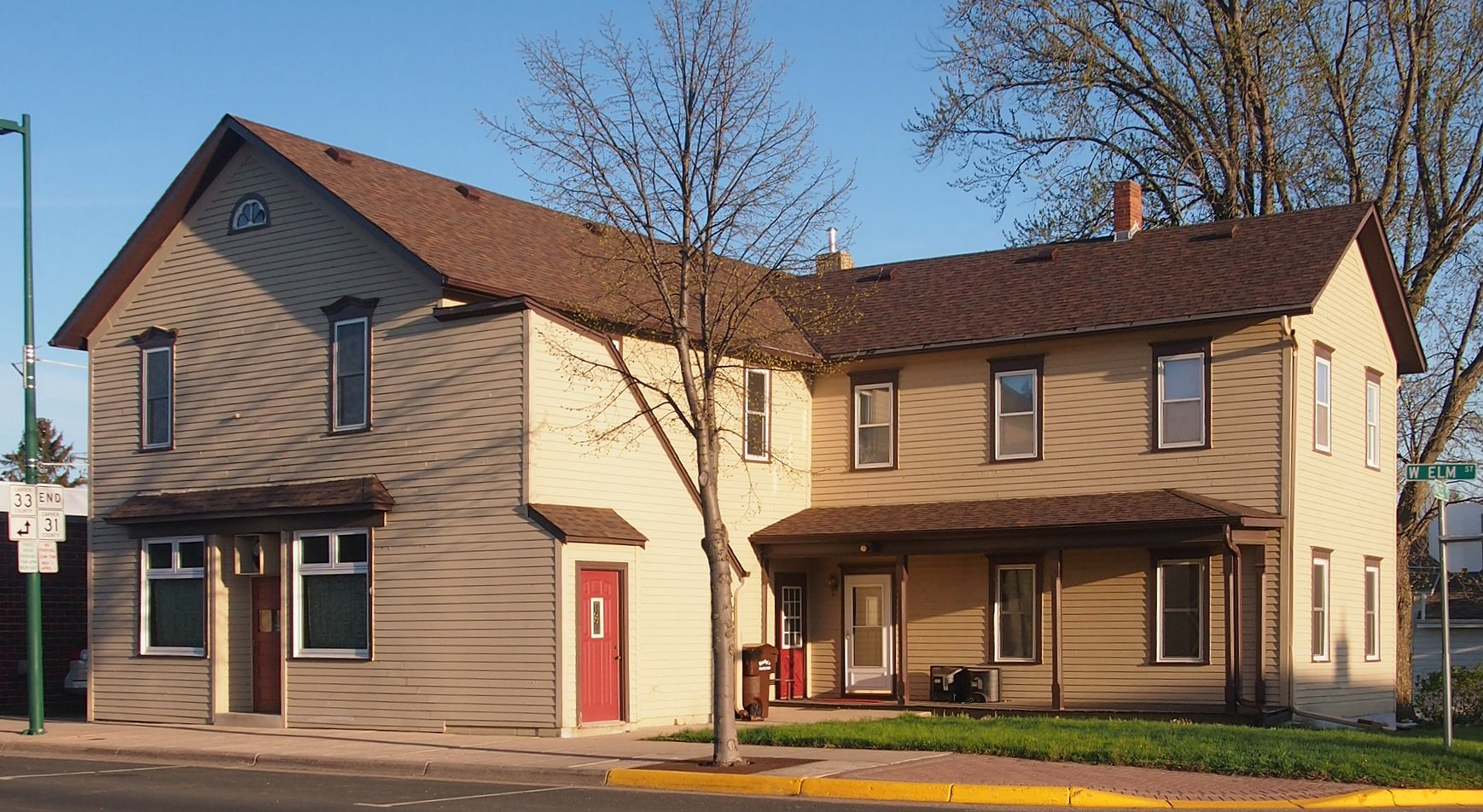
Winter Saloon (1890)

== Arts and culture ==
Norwood Young America is home to Stiftungsfest, Minnesota's oldest festival (dating back to 1861).
